= Marksistskaya (Moscow Metro) =

Moscow Metro station

Marksistskaya Марксистская
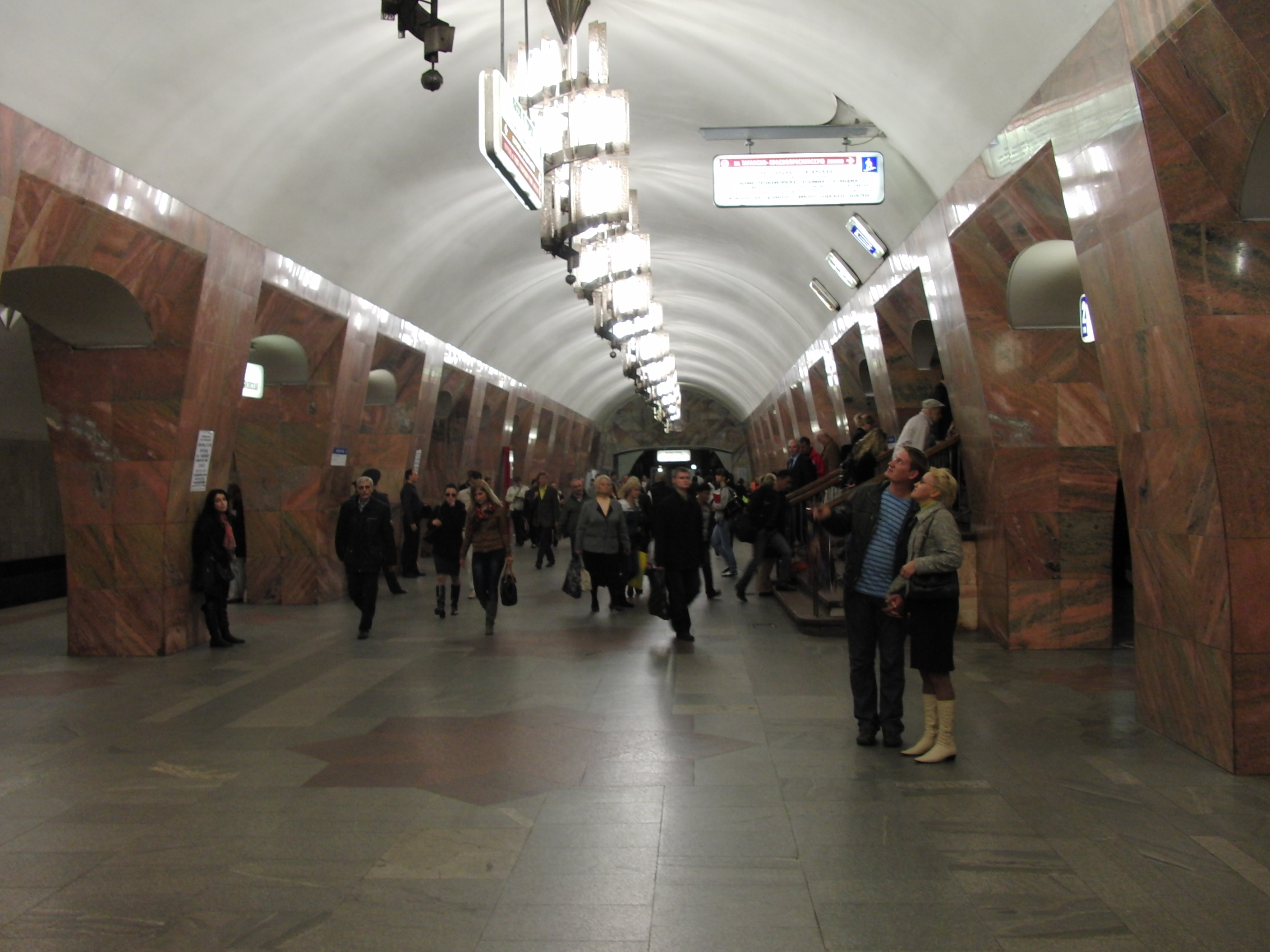

General information
- Location: Tagansky District; Central Administrative Okrug; Moscow; Russia
- Coordinates: 55.7411°N 37.6543°E
- System: Moscow Metro station
- Owner: Moskovsky Metropoliten
- Line: Kalininskaya line
- Platforms: 1
- Tracks: 2

Construction
- Structure type: Deep column station, tri-vault
- Depth: 60 metres (200 ft)
- Platform levels: 1
- Parking: No

Other information
- Station code: 084

History
- Opened: 30 December 1979; 46 years ago

Services
Preceding station	Moscow Metro	Following station
Tretyakovskaya Terminus	Kalininsko-Solntsevskaya line (Kalininsky radius)	Ploshchad Ilyicha towards Novokosino
Kurskaya anticlockwise / outer	Koltsevaya line transfer at Taganskaya	Paveletskaya clockwise / inner
Kitay-gorod towards Planernaya	Tagansko-Krasnopresnenskaya line transfer at Taganskaya	Proletarskaya towards Kotelniki
Route map
Location
- Location within Central Moscow

Marksistskaya (Russian: Марксистская, lit. 'Marxist') is a station of the Moscow Metro's Kalininsko-Solntsevskaya Line. It was opened along with the initial segment on 30 December 1979. The station is named after the Marksistskaya (Marxist) Street and its architectural theme is the purity of Marxist ideals.

Architects Nina Alyoshina, V. Volovich and N. Samoylova took a standard deep level column tri-vault station (engineers Ye. Barsky, I. Zhukov and Yu. Muromtsev) and applied on overall red theme that includes red Burovshina marble to the columns and a pink Gazgan to the station walls. The spiral-shaped light fixtures symbolize "spiral development", a concept in dialectical materialism, the Marxist philosophical teaching.

The station serves as a transfer point between the Taganskaya station of the Koltsevaya Line and the Taganskaya station of the Tagansko-Krasnopresnenskaya Line forming a busy three station transfer point. Transfer to the former is by the direct escalator from the end of Marksistskaya.

The station is located on the eastern edge of the Taganka Square, and its underground vestibule is situated on the influx of the Taganskaya and Marksistskaya streets into the square with surface subway access available to both sides of the latter street and to the open plaza on the apex of their connection.

It was the deepest station in Moscow Metro from 1979 until 1987.

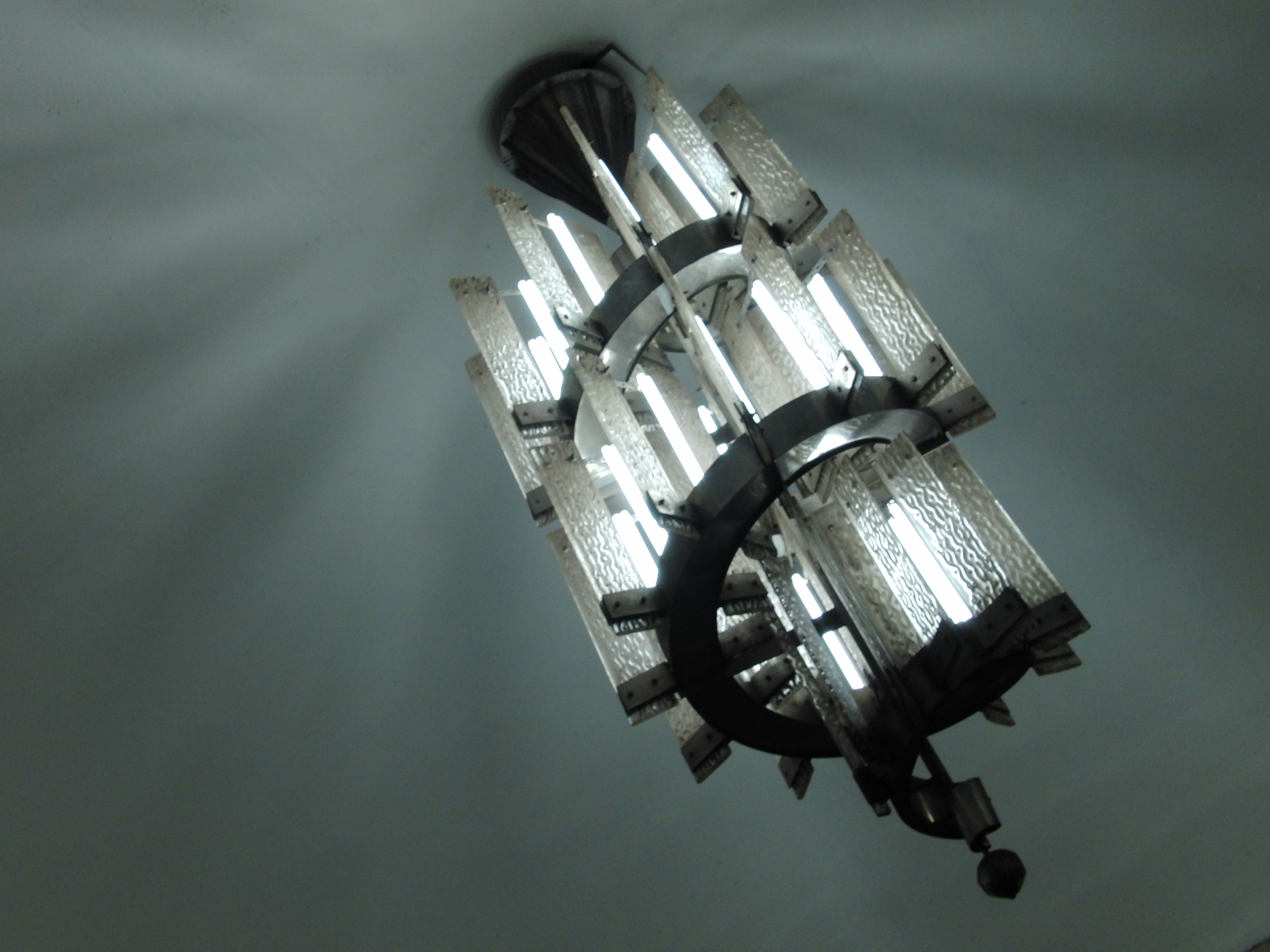
Station lighting
