= Taganskaya (Tagansko-Krasnopresnenskaya line) =

Moscow Metro station

Taganskaya Таганская
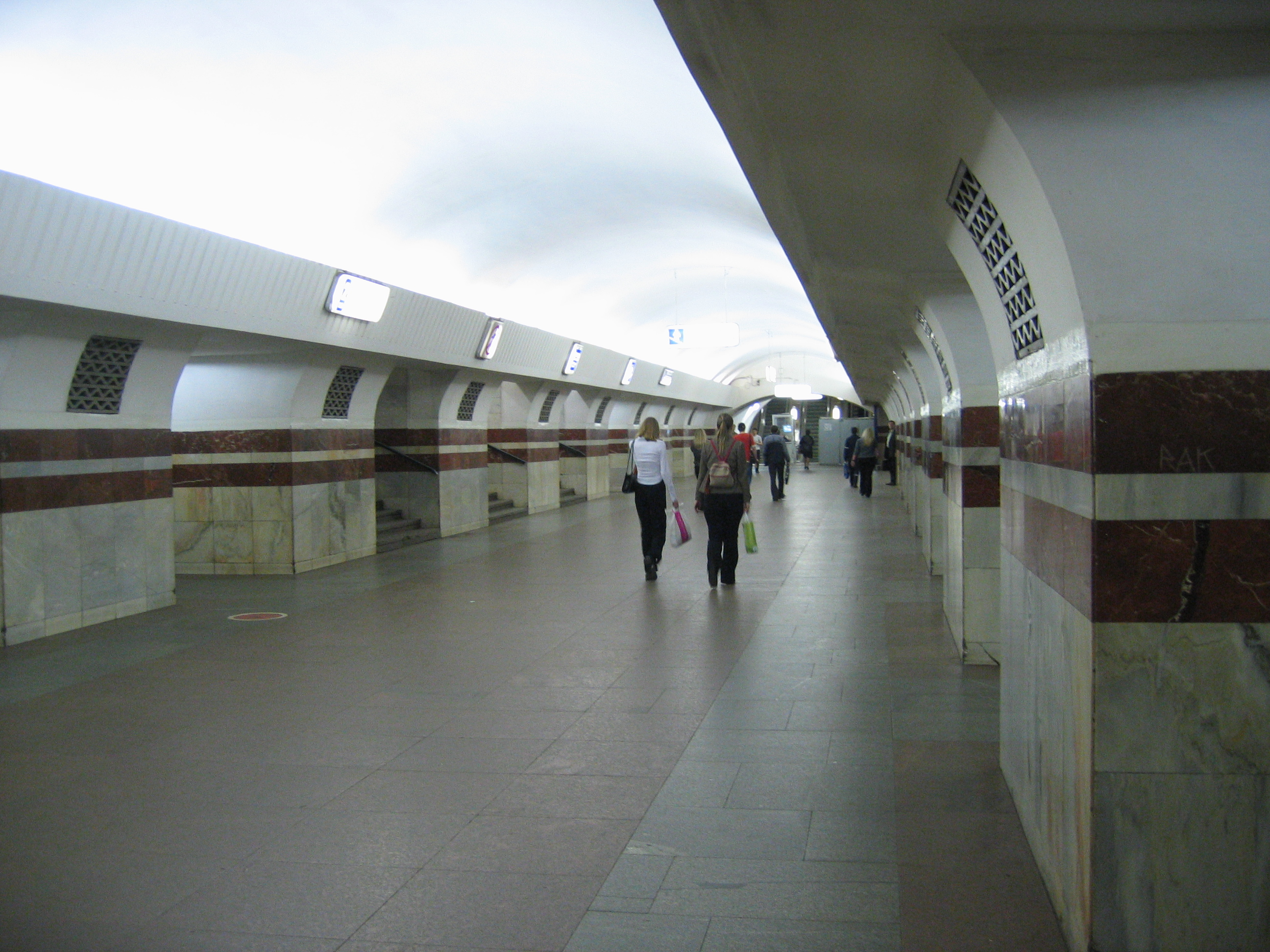

General information
- Location: Tagansky District; Central Administrative Okrug; Moscow; Russia
- Coordinates: 55.7402°N 37.6522°E
- System: Moscow Metro station
- Owner: Moskovsky Metropoliten
- Line: Tagansko-Krasnopresnenskaya line
- Platforms: 1 island platform
- Tracks: 2
- Connections: Bus: 156

Construction
- Structure type: Pylon station
- Depth: 36 metres (118 ft)
- Platform levels: 1
- Parking: No

Other information
- Station code: 116

History
- Opened: 31 December 1966; 59 years ago

Services
Preceding station	Moscow Metro	Following station
Kitay-gorod towards Planernaya	Tagansko-Krasnopresnenskaya line	Proletarskaya towards Kotelniki
Tretyakovskaya Terminus	Kalininsko-Solntsevskaya line (Kalininsky radius) transfer at Marksistskaya	Ploshchad Ilyicha towards Novokosino
Kurskaya anticlockwise / outer	Koltsevaya line transfer at Taganskaya	Paveletskaya clockwise / inner
Route map
Location
- Location within Central Moscow

Taganskaya (Russian: Таганская) is a Moscow Metro station in the Tagansky District, Central Administrative Okrug, Moscow. It is on the Tagansko–Krasnopresnenskaya line, between Kitay-gorod and Proletarskaya stations.

Taganskaya opened in 1966 as part of the start of the Zhdanovsky (now Tagansky) radius. The station's decoration is sparse yet stylish for the 1960s functional designs. Because the deep pylon trivault offers more potential for decorations, architects Nina Alyoshina and Yury Vdovin exploited this. Decorating the white marbled pylons with brown marble stripes. Likewise the white and black ceramic tiles and are decorated with metallic artworks with a space theme. The floor is covered with red and grey granite. The underground vestibule of the station is interlinked with the subway under the Bolshaya Kammenka street. The surface staircases of which are protected from the weather with glazed concrete pavilions (the first in Moscow). When the station was opened it was the terminus of the Zhdanovskaya line until 1970. Behind the station is a junction link allowing the train to reverse, also it leads onto a service link branch to the Koltsevaya line.

From the start the station was designed as a transfer point with the western escalators leading on to the Taganskaya station of the Koltsevaya line. In 1979, with the construction of the Marksistskaya station of the Kalininskaya line, three staircases were built into the northern wall.

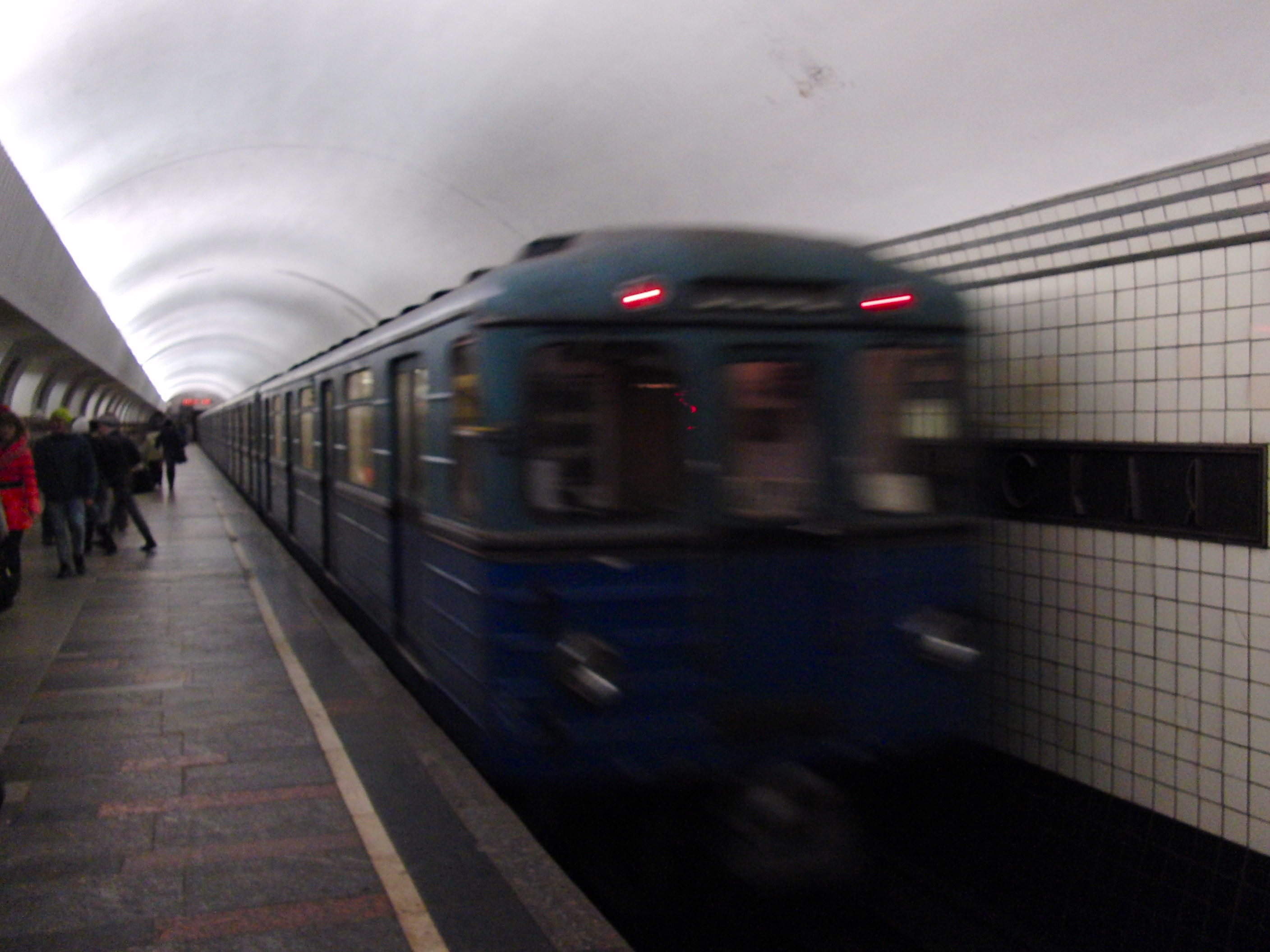
Station platform
