= Taganskaya (Koltsevaya line) =

Moscow Metro station

Taganskaya Таганская
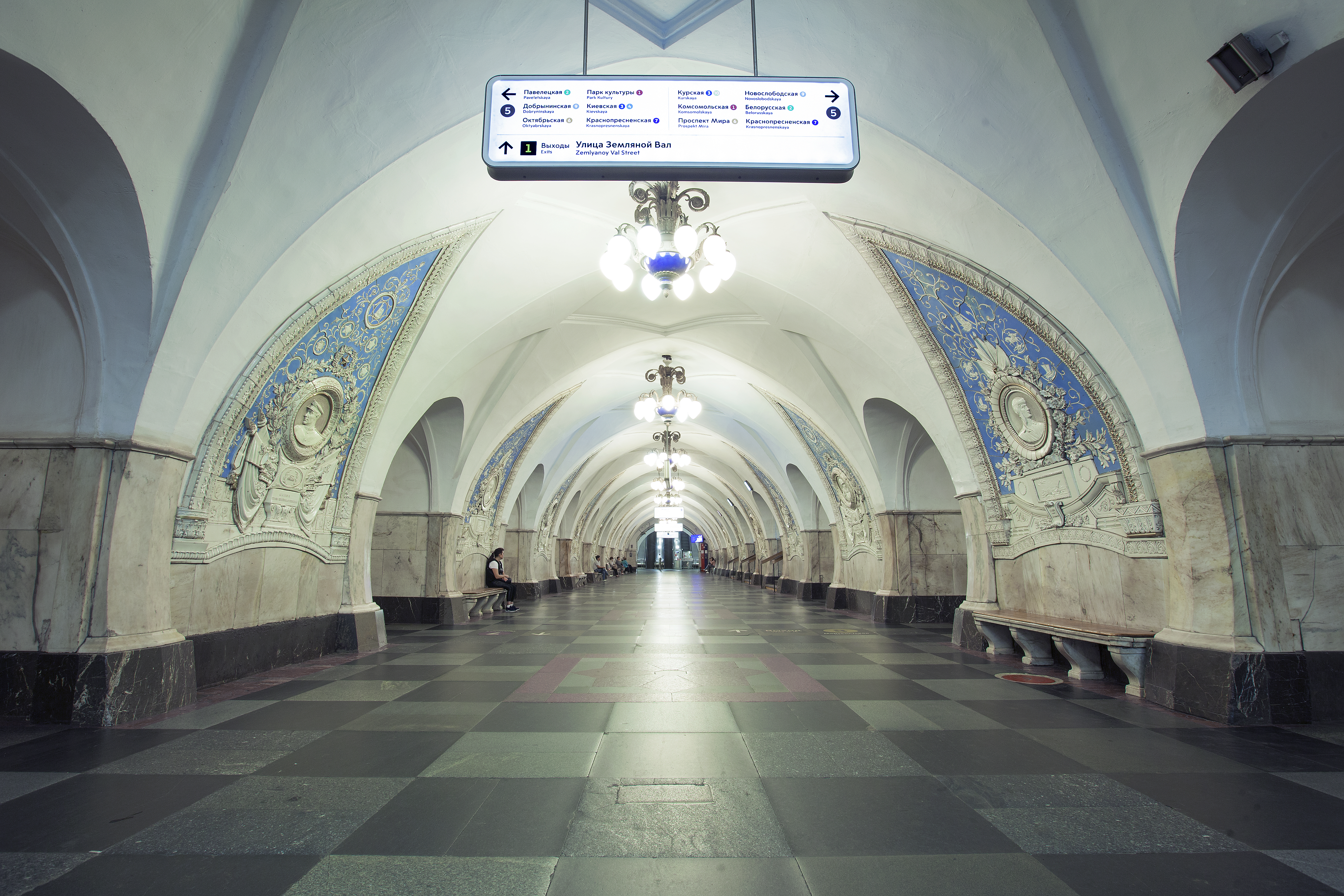

General information
- Location: Tagansky District; Central Administrative Okrug; Moscow; Russia
- Coordinates: 55.7418°N 37.6517°E
- System: Moscow Metro station
- Owner: Moskovsky Metropoliten
- Line: Koltsevaya line
- Platforms: 1 island platform
- Tracks: 2

Construction
- Structure type: Pylon station
- Depth: 53 metres (174 ft)
- Platform levels: 1
- Parking: No

Other information
- Station code: 072

History
- Opened: 1 January 1950; 76 years ago

Passengers
- 2002: 20,914,500

Services
| Preceding station | Moscow Metro | Following station |
|---|---|---|
| Kurskaya anticlockwise / outer | Koltsevaya line | Paveletskaya clockwise / inner |
| Kitay-gorod towards Planernaya | Tagansko-Krasnopresnenskaya line transfer at Taganskaya | Proletarskaya towards Kotelniki |
| Tretyakovskaya Terminus | Kalininsko-Solntsevskaya line (Kalininsky radius) transfer at Marksistskaya | Ploshchad Ilyicha towards Novokosino |
Route map
Location
- Location within Central Moscow

Taganskaya (Russian: Тага́нская) is a station on the Koltsevaya line of the Moscow Metro. It opened on 1 January 1950 with the first segment of the fourth stage of the system. The station is named after the Taganka Square which is a major junction of the Sadovoye Koltso.

Designed by architects K. Ryzhkov and A. Medvedev, this pylon station was built with the post-war flamboyance in mind, the overall design is based on the traditional Russian motives in decorations. The central feature of the station are 48 maiolica panels located on each face of the pylon. (works of Ye.Blinova, P. Kozhin, A. Sotnikov, A. Berzhitskaya and Z. Sokolova). These contain apart from floral elements, profile bas-reliefs of various World War II Red Army and Navy servicemen each dedicated to a group such as pilots, tank crews, sailors etc. The color gamma is balanced in such a way that the panels facing the central hall are on a blue majolica background, whilst the platform hall panels are monochromatic. Lighting comes from a set of 12 gilded chandeliers in the central hall with the same blue majolica center. The remaining decoration of the station include a cream-colored ceramic tile on the walls, powder colored marble on the lower pylons and also on the walls, and a checkerboard floor layout of black and gray granite.

The end of the central hall once had a large sculptural group Stalin and youth, however this was replaced in 1961 by a new artwork of the same authors (P. Baladin and Ye. Blinova) depicting Vladimir Lenin, Coats of arms of the Soviet Republics and images of Hero-Cities Leningrad, Stalingrad, Sevastopol and Odessa. This was also taken down in late 1966 to make way for a transfer to the newly opened Taganskaya of the Zhdanovskaya line. Further transfer was opened in 1979 by adding a stairwell into the middle of the central hall for the new station Marksistskaya of the Kalininskaya line. A replica of the Stalin and youth was unveiled in 2025 as part of the 90th anniversary of the opening of the metro.

Because the Taganka Square is located on the hill, in order to conveniently place the large vestibule, and also preserve a nearby heritage building, the escalator descent had to be broken, and an intermediate hall was added by placing a large cylinder and gradually lowering to the required depth. After a dome was added, the interior work on the new lobby began, the walls of which are faced with Altai marble Oroktoy with Syringa shade, and the pilasters from white marble. The dome contains a large ceiling fresco, Victory Fireworks by A. Shiryaeva.

On 18 November 2005 the vestibule was closed for restoration, during which old escalators (installed in 1949) were replaced. All of the decoration features were renovated, and the upgrade included new turnstiles, ticket offices and security upgrade. The station was re-opened on 20 December 2006.

It was the deepest station in Moscow Metro from 1950 until 1958.

On 15 May 2025, a bas-relief wall panel depicting Joseph Stalin was installed in the connecting passage between the two Taganskaya stations. An earlier version of this sculpture at this location was removed in 1966. Stalin was removed from the relief in the 1950s during the De-Stalinization campaign. Russian human rights activist Yan Rachinsky wrote that "among Stalin’s victims were more than 750 construction workers and employees of the Moscow Metro. More than 140 were executed, including the subway’s first director, Petrikovsky (his name appears in a Stalinist execution list dated August 20, 1938). There’s no mention of these people anywhere in the subway today, but the man responsible for their deaths is honored with a life-sized statue."

== Popular culture ==
In 1991 the rock band Lyube recorded the song Taganskaya Station about the station in its debut album titled Atas.

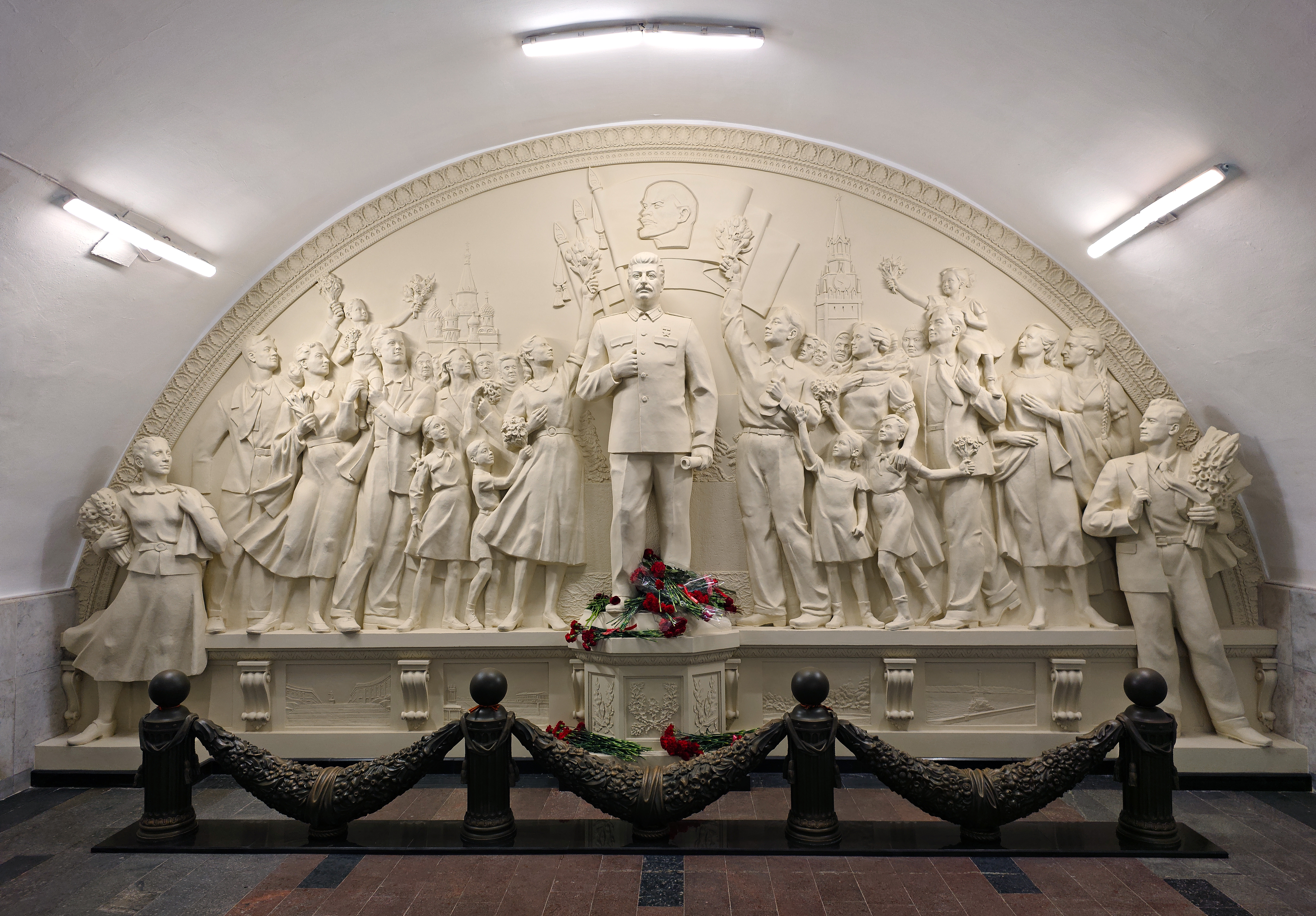
Restored Stalin relief at Taganskaya metro station

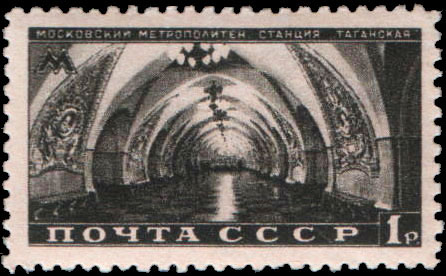
Taganskaya on a 1950 stamp

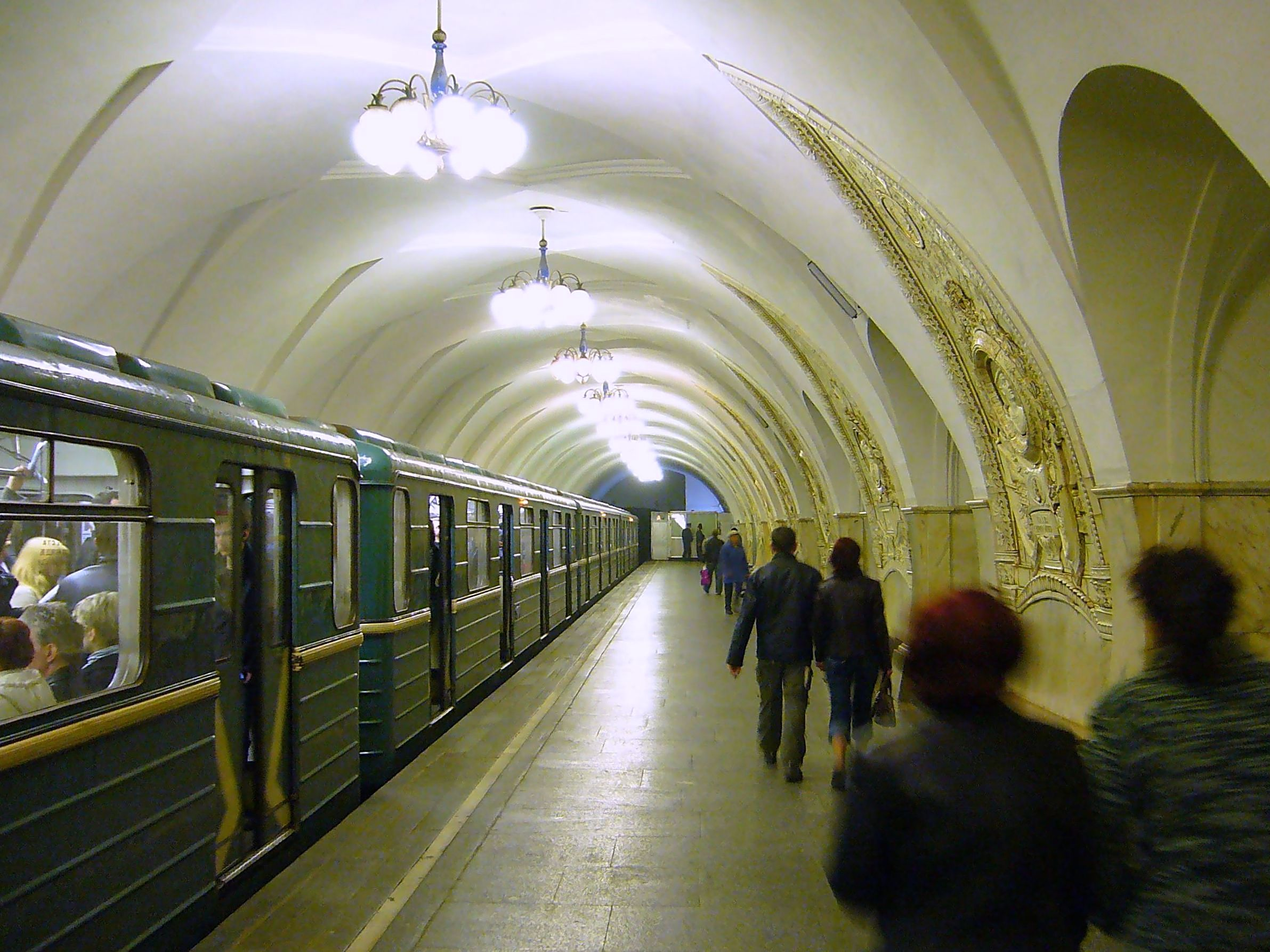
Station platform of Taganskaya

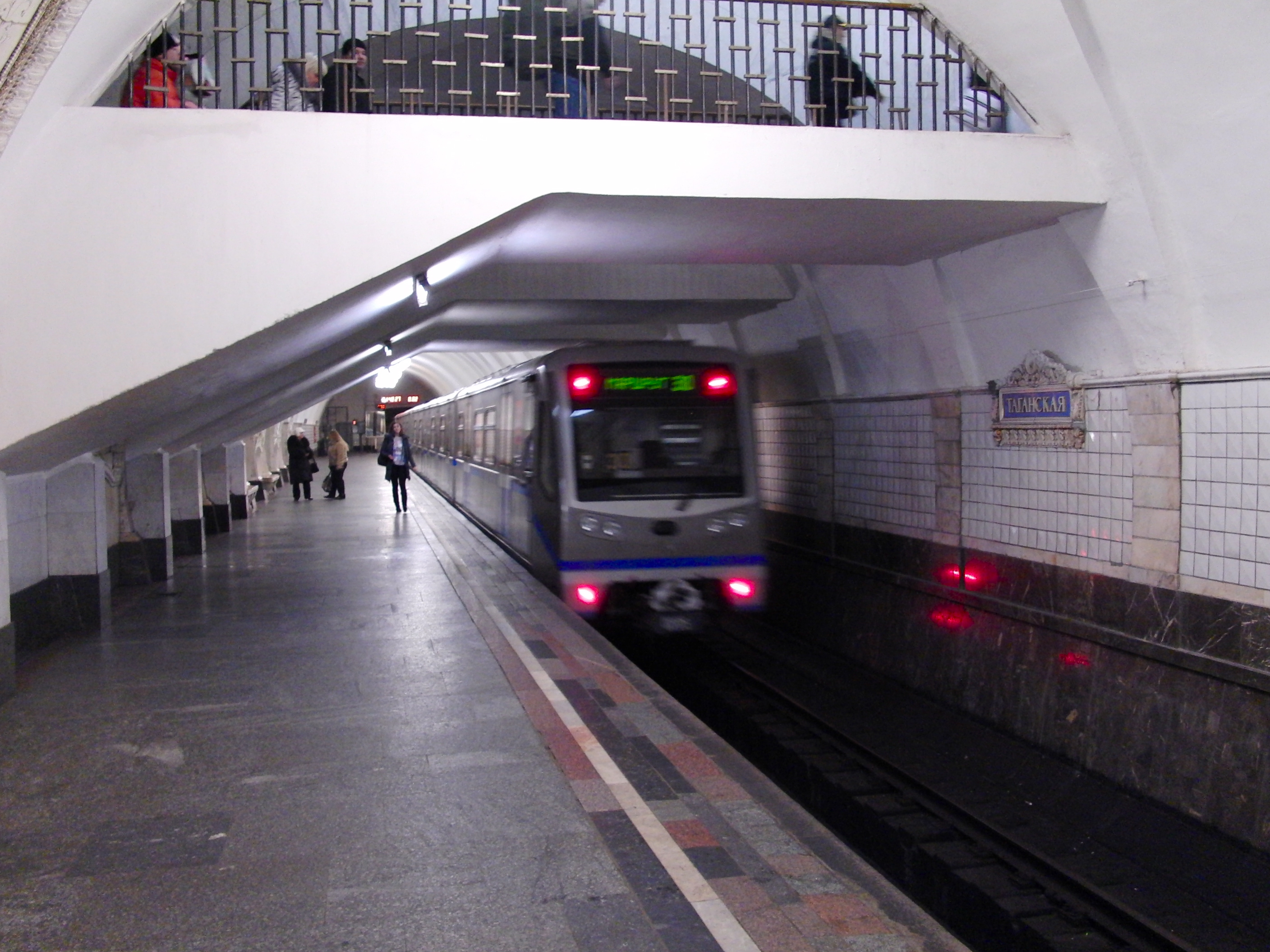
Leaving Rusich train. The upper pass is used for connection to the Tagansko–Krasnopresnenskaya line and the Kalininskaya line

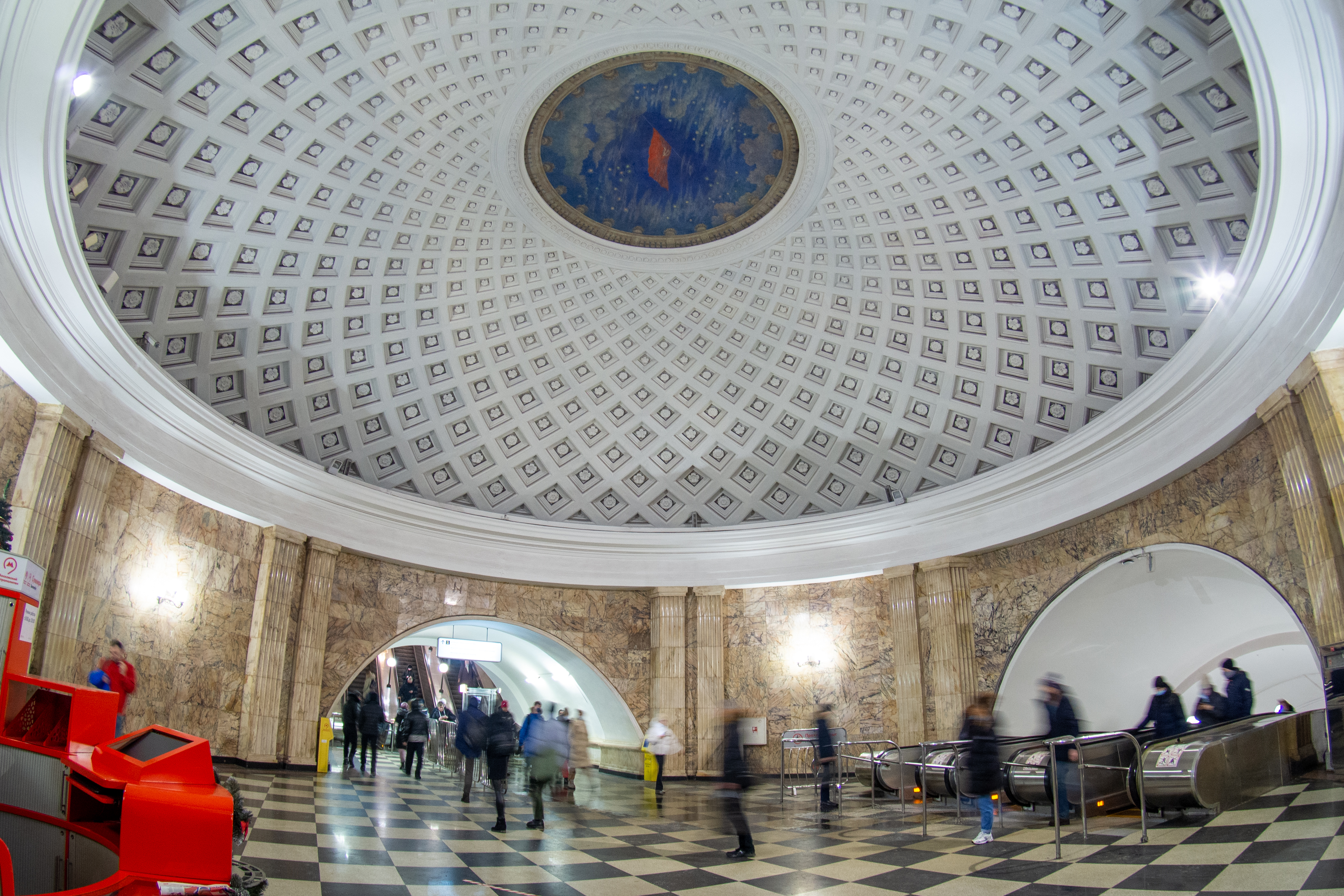
Round middle escalator hall
