= Taganskaya Square =

Square in Moscow, Russia

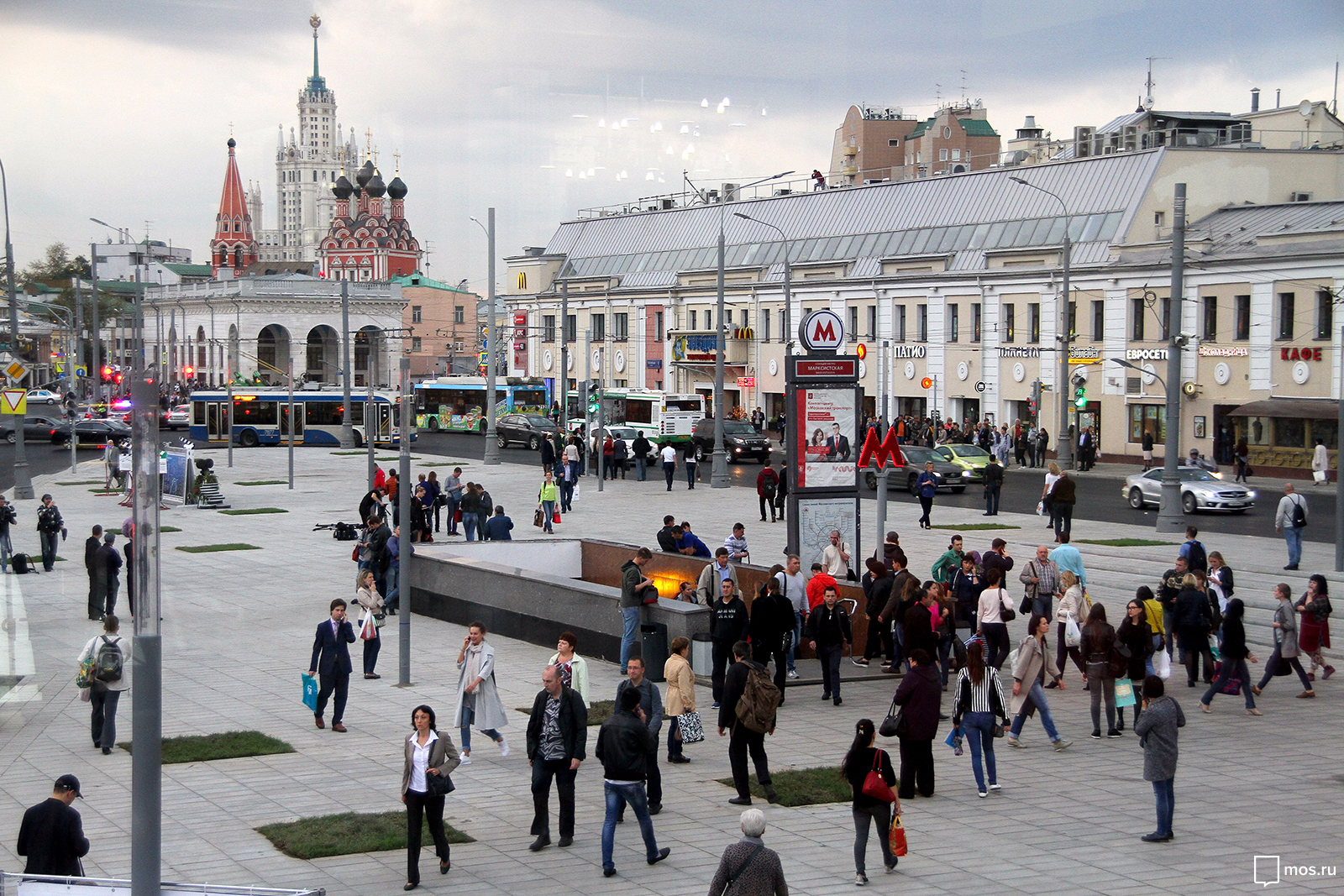
- Taganskaya square after reconstruction. September 2016
- Interactive map of Taganskaya Square
- Native name: Таганская площадь (Russian)
- Location: Moscow; Central Administrative Okrug; Tagansky District
- Postal code: 109044, 109240
- Nearest metro station: Taganskaya; Taganskaya; Marksistskaya
- Coordinates: 55°44′25″N 37°39′09″E

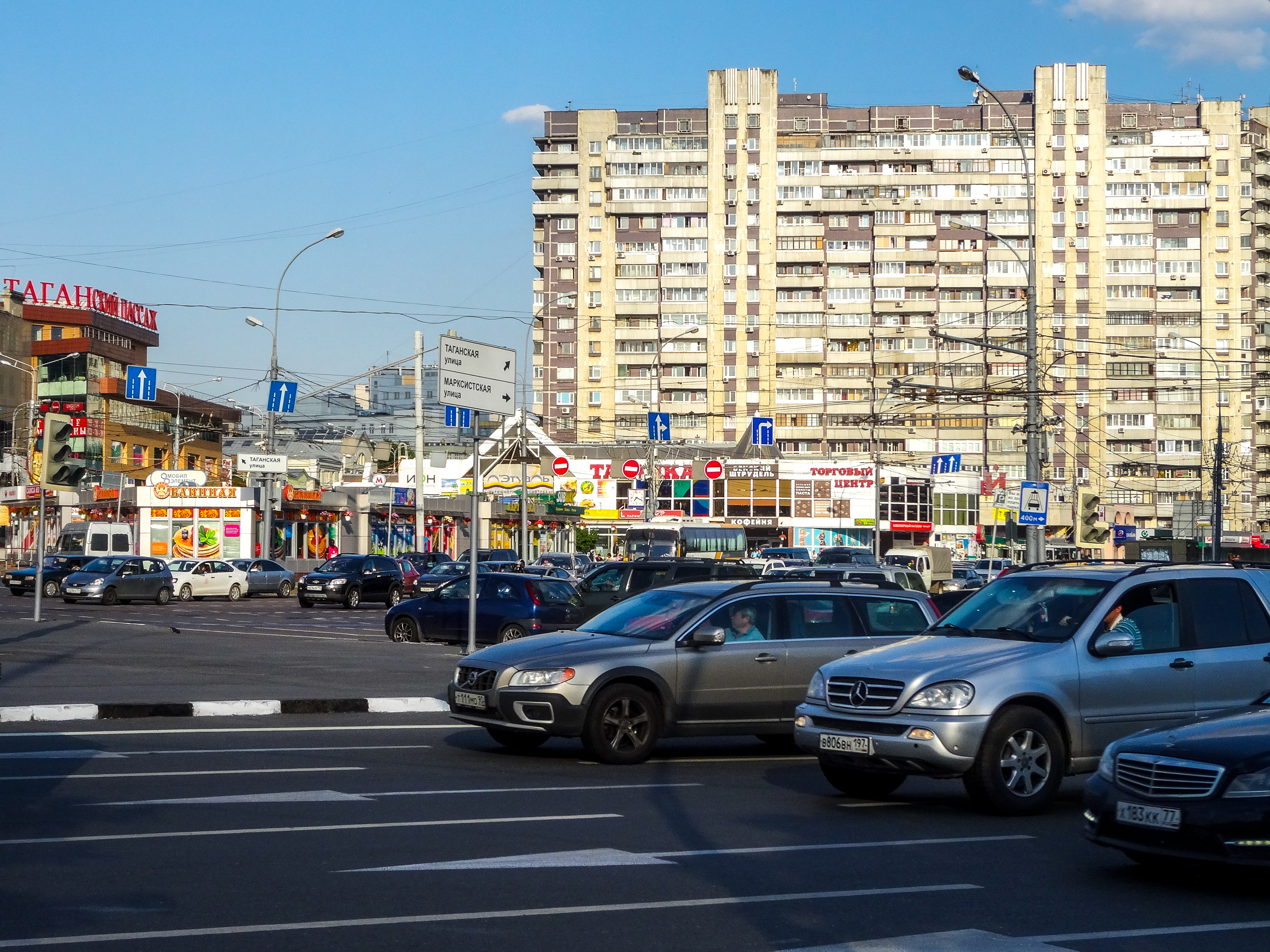
View to Taganskaya square. Stalls near entrance to "Marksistskaya" metro station not demolished yet. July 2014

Taganskaya Square (Russian: Таганская площадь) is a city square at the south-eastern corner of the Garden Ring in central Moscow, formed in 1963 by merging two historic squares, Upper Taganka and Lower Taganka. In 1813 the district of Taganka was reconstructed by Joseph Bové, who built a market there. The most conspicuous landmarks are the lofty St Nicholas Church on Bolvanovka (1697–1712) and the Taganka Theatre. There is also a subway station, called Taganskaya.
