= Ploshchad Ilyicha =

Moscow Metro station

Ploshchad Ilyicha Площадь Ильича
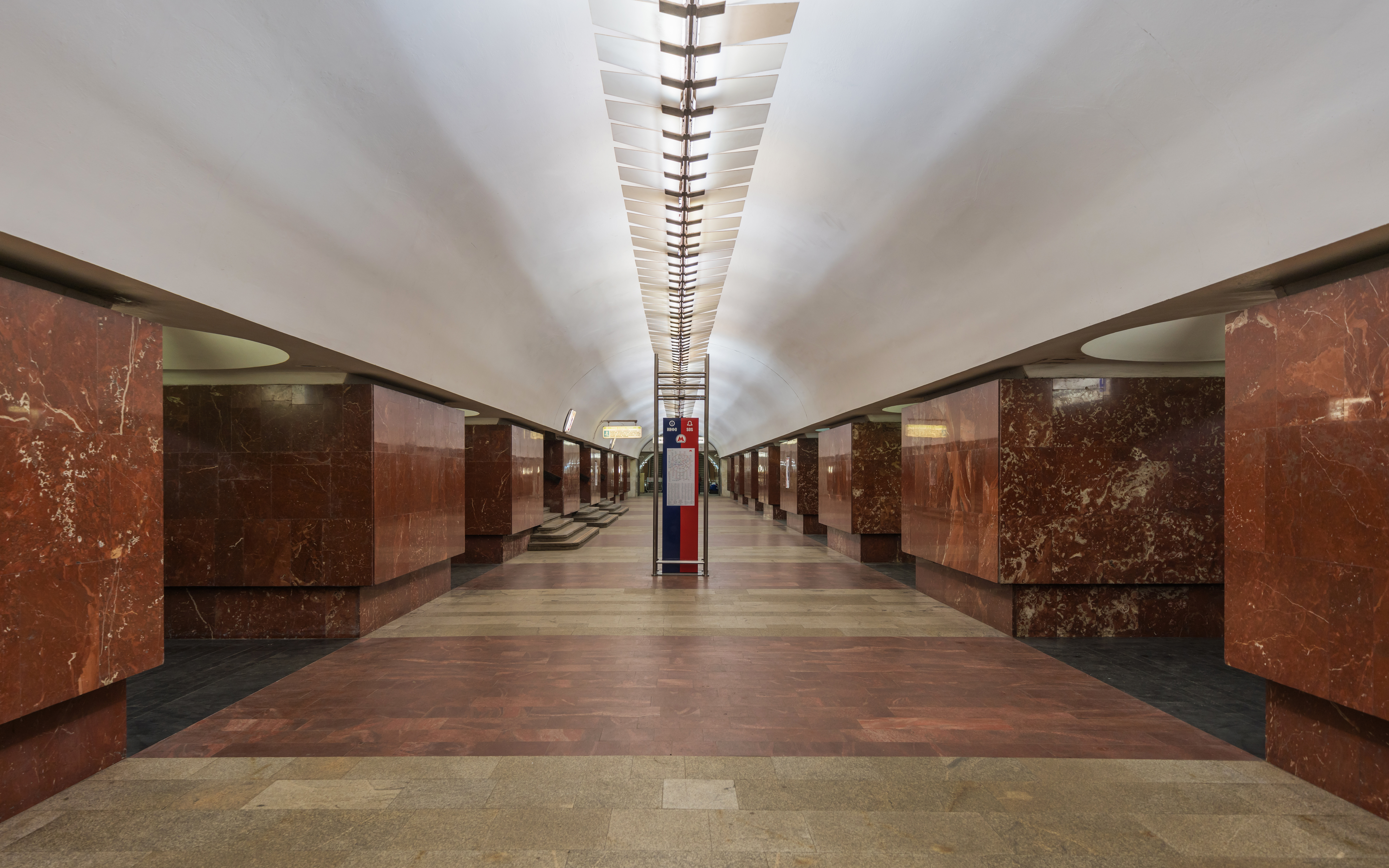

General information
- Location: Tagansky District; Central Administrative Okrug; Moscow; Russia
- Coordinates: 55.7472°N 37.6824°E
- System: Moscow Metro station
- Owner: Moskovsky Metropoliten
- Line: Kalininskaya line
- Platforms: 1
- Tracks: 2

Construction
- Structure type: Pylon station
- Depth: 46 metres (151 ft)
- Platform levels: 1
- Parking: No

Other information
- Station code: 083

History
- Opened: 30 December 1979; 46 years ago

Services
Preceding station	Moscow Metro	Following station
Marksistskaya towards Tretyakovskaya	Kalininsko-Solntsevskaya line (Kalininsky radius)	Aviamotornaya towards Novokosino
Chkalovskaya towards Fiztekh	Lyublinsko-Dmitrovskaya line transfer at Rimskaya	Krestyanskaya Zastava towards Zyablikovo
Route map
Location
- Location within Moscow Metro

Ploshchad Ilyicha (Russian: Площадь Ильича) is a station on the Moscow Metro's Kalininsko-Solntsevskaya Line. It was opened on 30 December 1979 as part of the line's first stage.

== Name ==
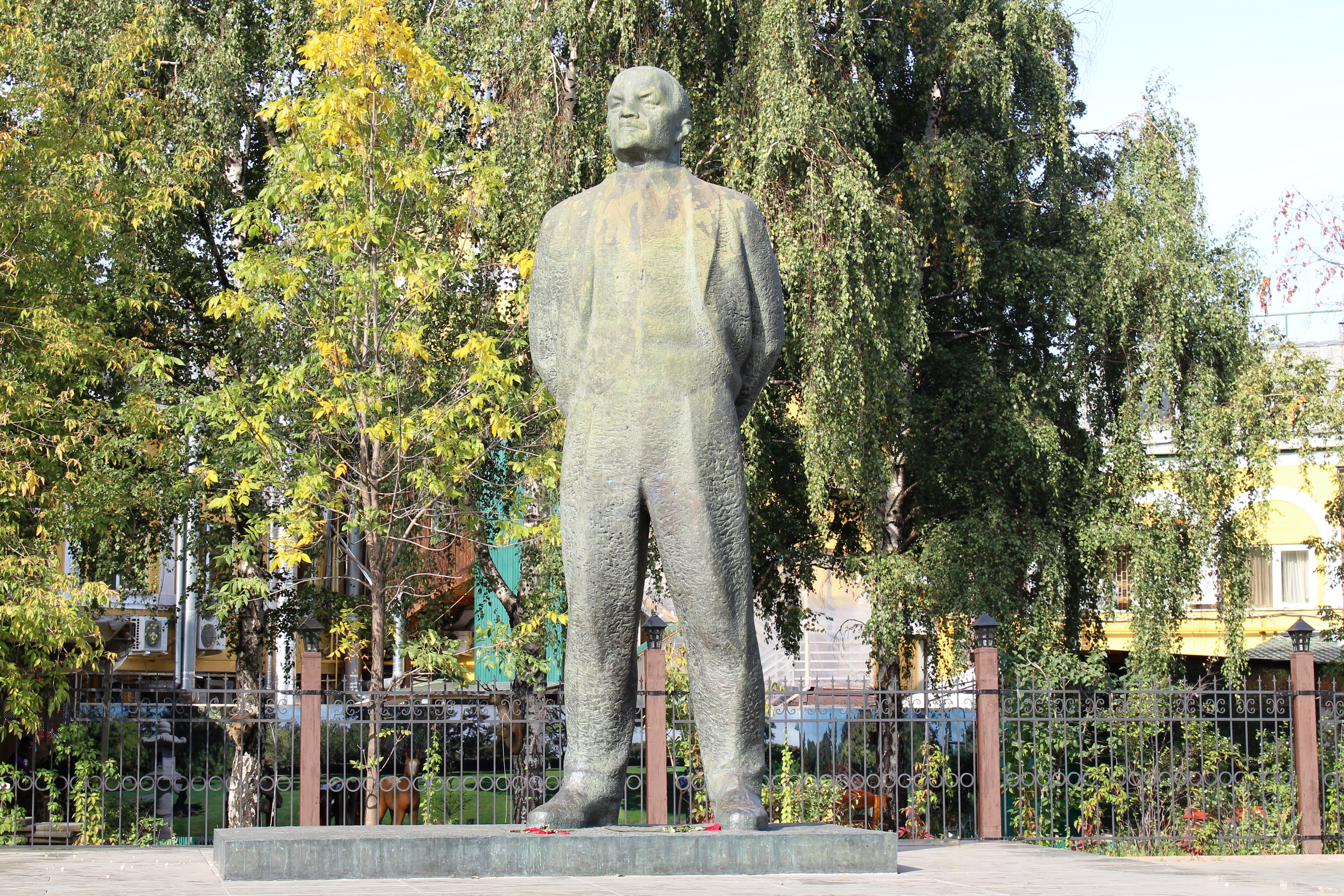
Statue of Lenin, Rogozhskaya Zastava Square

It is named after the Ilyich Square (indirectly referring to either Vladimir Ilyich Lenin by his patronymic). The square has since been renamed to Rogozhskaya Zastava Square.

== Building ==
The station is a deep-level pylon tri-vault design. The connotation of the location's former name, influenced the architectural theme of the station realisation of Lenin's ideas by architects L. Popov and V. Klokov and engineers Ye. Barsky and Yu. Murmotsev.

The station walls are faced with white koelga marble, which are punctuated by metallic artworks depicting the hammer and sickle. Thick cubic shaped pylons are faced with dark red marble seliyeti, "rest" on a laboradorite socle. The floor is covered with red and grey granite, whilst lightning elements are mounted into a metallic carcass that is fixed to top of the vaults, a straight one for the central hall, and a zig-zagged shaped for the platform. At the rear of the central hall is a large bas-relief of Vladimir Lenin created by the People's Artist of the USSR Nikolai Tomsky.

The station's vestibule, designed by architect I.Petukhova, is connected directly to the central hall by a three-escalator ascend, and is located underground under the Rogozhskaya Zastava square. The square itself is a major intersection where the Sergey Radonezhsky Street becomes the Enthusiasts Highway an arterial road that will eventually become the M7 Motorway. Of the square come the Rogozhsky Val, Mezhdunarodnaya (International), Rabochaya and Shkolnaya Streets. In addition the station serves as a transfer point with the Railway station Serp i Molot of the Gorky direction.

In 1995, the station Rimskaya of the Lyublinskaya Line was opened, and to achieve transfer a side staircase was added which directly connects by escalator to the end of new station's platform.

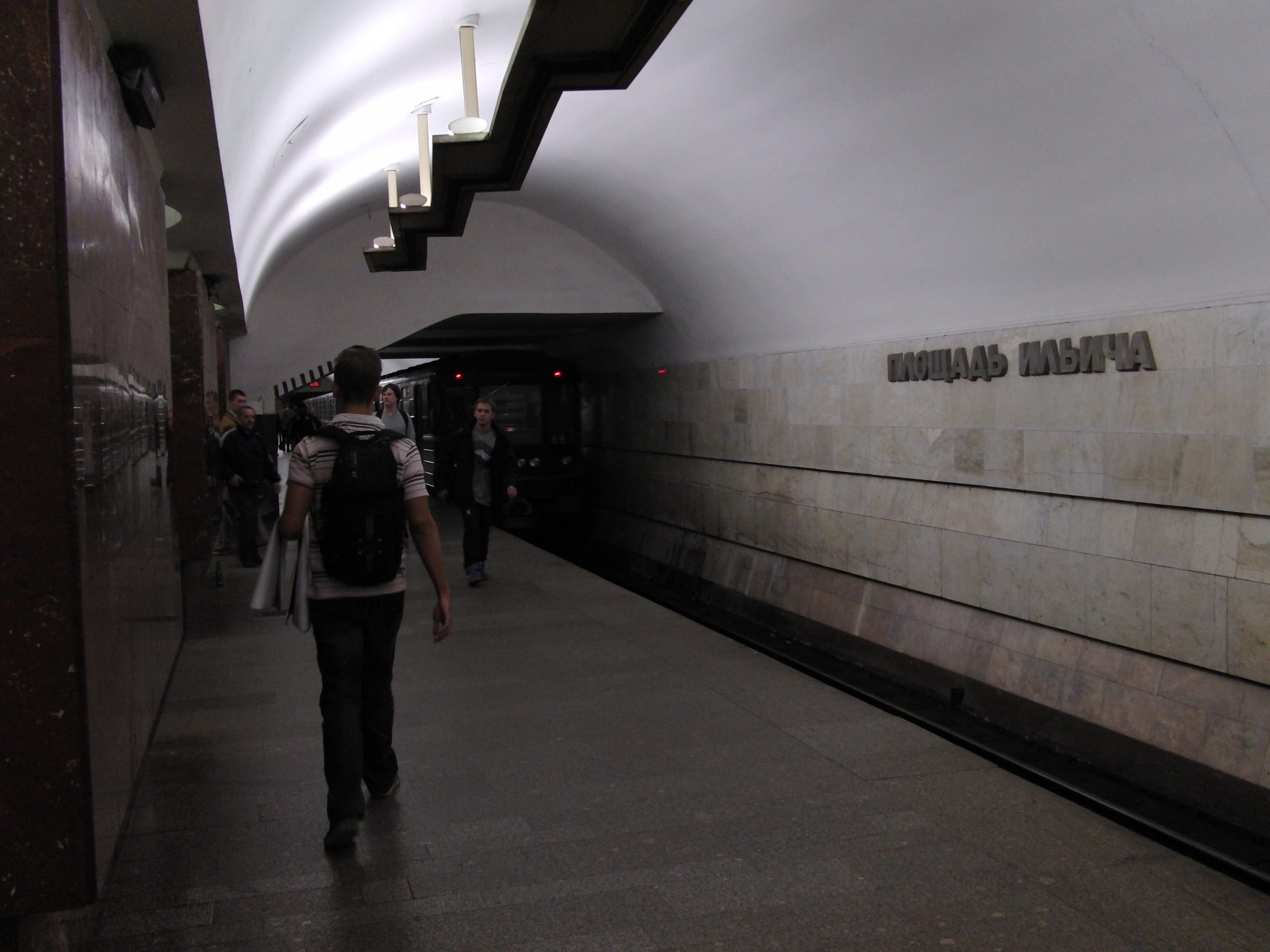
Platform. The upper pass connects with the Lyublinsko-Dmitrovskaya Line
