= Andrei Evseev =

Soviet serial killer

- Born: Andrei Nikolaevich Evseev; 1955; Khotkovo, Moscow Oblast, RSFSR
- Died: 1979 (aged 23–24); Moscow, RSFSR
- Cause of death: Execution by shooting
- Other names: "The Tagansky Maniac" "The Killer of women in red" "The Killer with sideburns" "The Killer with kind eyes"
- Status: Executed
- Conviction: Murder with aggravating circumstances
- Penalty: Death

Details
- Victims: 9
- Span of crimes: 1974–1977
- Country: Soviet Union
- State: Moscow
- Date apprehended: 28 December 1977

Andrei Nikolaevich Evseev (Russian: Андре́й Никола́евич Евсе́ев, 1955 – 1979), known as The Tagansky Maniac, was a Soviet serial killer who operated in Moscow and the Moscow Oblast in the mid-1970s.

== Biography ==
Evseev was born in 1955. He left school after the 7th grade, and took on a series of odd jobs as a model, laboratory assistant and sailor. In the early 1970s, Evseev was placed in a psychiatric clinic. In the wake of this experience, he recounted:

...I left the hospital a complete fool for all the drugs that were injected into me in the hospital. I experienced a very painful state, difficulties in brain activity. I considered people to be my first enemies...

The first victim of the killer was a 16-year-old schoolgirl named Marina Morozova, who was dressed in red clothes. The murder was committed by Evseev in the city of Zagorsk (now Sergiyev Posad) on August 25, 1974. The following day, Evseev killed 66-year-old chef Gennady Kuzmin, stabbing him with a knife several times near the Odintsovo railway station, then robbed the corpse and threw him into a roadside ditch. Evseev stole money and a grocery order that was scarce in Soviet times - a broiler chicken and three kilograms of Bulgarian peaches. On suspicion of committing these crimes in the Kemerovo Oblast, 19-year-old Sergei Savelyev, who deserted on the eve of the first murder from the military unit, was arrested, but he failed to prove his involvement, despite the fact that he confessed to the murder of Morozova.

In September 1974, in Moscow, in the park of the Palace of Culture named after the Third International, Evseev attacked student Vladimir Parshin, inflicting four knife wounds on him, but he survived. On 24 September 1974, in Moscow, in a house near the Dobryninskaya metro station, Evseev attacked and robbed Anna Astafyeva. Despite being on the verge of life and death, she was able to describe the killer; according to her, the killer was a young man with sideburns and kind eyes. Soon after, the woman died in hospital.

On 26 September, at the 43rd kilometre station in the Moscow Oblast, Evseev attacked a man and seriously injured him. When attacking, the killer broke his knife and the blade was left stuck in the victim's back, who died later in hospital. The murdered man, who looked very similar to Evseev, was 42-year-old Nikolai Dyomin, who had spent almost 20 years in prison. As it later turned out, Evseev committed the murder with the aim of confusing the tracks by putting his clothes on the man. Initially, the investigators even thought it was Dyomin who committed all the robberies and murders.

On 8 October 1974, in the Tagansky District of Moscow, Evseev made three robbery attacks at once. Two of the three women robbed by him died from the knife wounds, and all of them wore red dresses. Panic began in Moscow, with people saying that the "Killer of women in red" had appeared. On 15 October, in the area of the Akademicheskaya metro station, at intervals of 20 minutes, Evseev committed two more attacks on girls, one of them dying from the wounds received. On 16 October, in the area of the Proletarskaya metro station, Evseev again made a double attack, killing one of the victims. But this time neither victim was wearing red clothes.

After this, Evseev committed a series of robberies in Moscow and the surrounding region, but all victims survived and described the killer the same way. In connection with the panic in Moscow, the leadership of the Ministry of Internal Affairs of the USSR decided on unprecedented measures, the Minister of Internal Affairs Nikolai Shchelokov spoke on television, warning the citizens to be cautious. This frightened Evseev, who ceased his attacks for almost two years.

In November 1976, Evseev committed four robberies in a month, two of which ended in murder. In the fall of 1977, Evseev hit the secretary-typist of the Central Committee of the CPSU Nina Dalinjan on the head with a screwdriver, but she survived. The apotheosis of the criminal activity of the killer was the brutal murder of Lydia Kupriyanova, the wife of Soviet artist Mikhail Kupriyanov, member of famous artist trio known as "Kukryniksy". This time, for the first time, the killer raped the victim posthumously. Two months later, on 19 December 1977, in front of dozens of people in the backyard of the "Housewares" store in the village of Sofrino, he committed another murder. He took the watch, money, jewellery and a dog collar from the murdered Lydia Schur, raping her corpse afterwards.

=== Arrest, trial and sentence ===
A witness to the last murder reported that he had seen a suspicious man in a corduroy jacket at the crime scene. The local drinking company said that with them appeared a certain Shahnov, dressed in the velvet jacket. The jacket, on which there were blood stains and a knife was in one of the pockets, was later found. However, when Shahnov was arrested, he reported that another man had given him that jacket, with subsequent examination confirming the man's testimony. Another witness said that he had seen a stranger on a train in Khotkovo, and that he was wearing a railwayman's uniform. When the database was picked up and according to it was selected suitable matches, 22-year-old criminal Andrei Evseev came up as a result.

On 28 December 1977, the killer was arrested. On this day he had dressed the New Year;s tree with jewels stolen from the victims. When they came for him, he hid the jewels, and there was nothing suspicious in Evseev's apartment, except for the dog collar stolen from the last victim. He explained that he kept it hidden as a memory of his beloved dog. At first, he refused to give evidence, but on 31 December, on New Year's Eve, while conversing with a cellmate, he dropped a strange phrase: "My mother, I suppose, already baked pies with jewels". The cellmate turned out to be an informant, and the investigators guessed that the stolen jewellery was hidden in a bag of flour. The conjecture was confirmed during the second search of Evseev's apartment.

During the interrogations, Evseev was defiant and refused to communicate with the female investigator. He agreed to testify only after he was brought salted herring, which he ate entirely with bones. Subsequently, he confessed to 9 murders, 18 attempted murders, one rape and 32 robberies.

As a result of forensic psychiatric examination Evseev was declared as mentally competent to stand trial, but at the same time diagnosed with "sociopathy". While waiting for the court, Evseev took care about himself, and did exercises every morning. The killer felt no remorse for his deeds, claiming that he despised those who work and live "from salary to salary."

In 1979, the court sentenced Andrei Evseev to death, and he was soon executed by firing squad.

== In the media ==
- Documentary film The murderer with sideburns from the series "The investigation was conducted..".

== See also ==
- List of Russian serial killers
