= Paveletsky =

Paveletsky (masculine), Paveletskoye (neuter), or Paveletskaya (feminine) may refer to:

- Paveletsky railway station in Moscow, Russia
- Paveletskaya (Koltsevaya Line), a station of the Moscow Metro
- Paveletskaya (Zamoskvoretskaya Line), a station of the Moscow Metro
