= Chkalovskaya (Moscow Metro) =

Moscow Metro station

Chkalovskaya Чкаловская
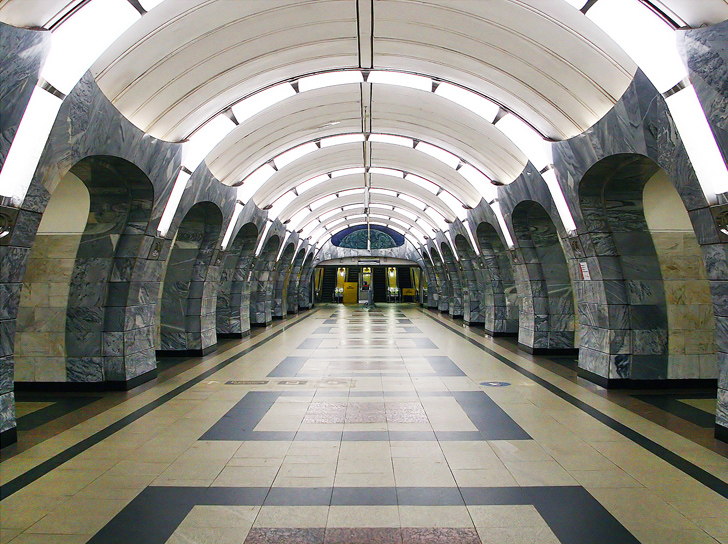

General information
- Location: Basmanny District, Central Administrative Okrug; Moscow; Russia
- Coordinates: 55.7565°N 37.6573°E
- System: Moscow Metro station
- Owner: Moskovsky Metropoliten
- Line: Lyublinsko-Dmitrovskaya line
- Platforms: 1 island platform
- Tracks: 2
- Connections: Bus: B, Bk, 40, 78; Tram: B, 20, 24

Construction
- Depth: 51 metres (167 ft)
- Platform levels: 1
- Parking: No

Other information
- Station code: 151, ChK

History
- Opened: 28 December 1995; 30 years ago

Services
Preceding station	Moscow Metro	Following station
Sretensky Bulvar towards Fiztekh	Lyublinsko-Dmitrovskaya line	Rimskaya towards Zyablikovo
Ploshchad Revolyutsii towards Pyatnitskoye Shosse	Arbatsko-Pokrovskaya line transfer at Kurskaya	Baumanskaya towards Shchyolkovskaya
Taganskaya anticlockwise / outer	Koltsevaya line transfer at Kurskaya	Komsomolskaya clockwise / inner
Route map
Location
- Location within Central Moscow

Chkalovskaya (Russian: Чка́ловская) is a Moscow Metro station in the Basmanny District, Central Administrative Okrug, Moscow. It is on the Lyublinsko-Dmitrovskaya Line, between Sretensky Bulvar and Rimskaya stations.

Chkalovskaya opened on 28 December 1995 as the first stage of the Lyublinskiy radius.

== Design ==
A team of architects designed the station: Nina Alexandrovna Aleshin, Leonid Borzenkov, and Aleksandr Vigdorov. Named after the famous Soviet aviator Valery Chkalov, the decorative theme is dedicated to aviation. The station is modified Pylon trivaulted at a depth of 51 metres. The pylons are revetted with grey and light blue wavy marble whilst the floor is covered with grey red and black granite. The hinged ceiling is covered in semi-circular lighting. The walls are done with combined marble tones.

== Exits ==
An escalator leads from one end of the station's underground vestibule to Zemlyanoi Val street and Kurskiy Rail Terminal. The vestibule also acts as a transfer to Kurskaya-Koltsevaya. The other end of the hall is a direct transfer to Kurskaya-Radialnaya of the Arbatsko-Pokrovskaya Line, which opened on 28 March 1996.
