= Rimskaya =

Moscow Metro station

Rimskaya Римская
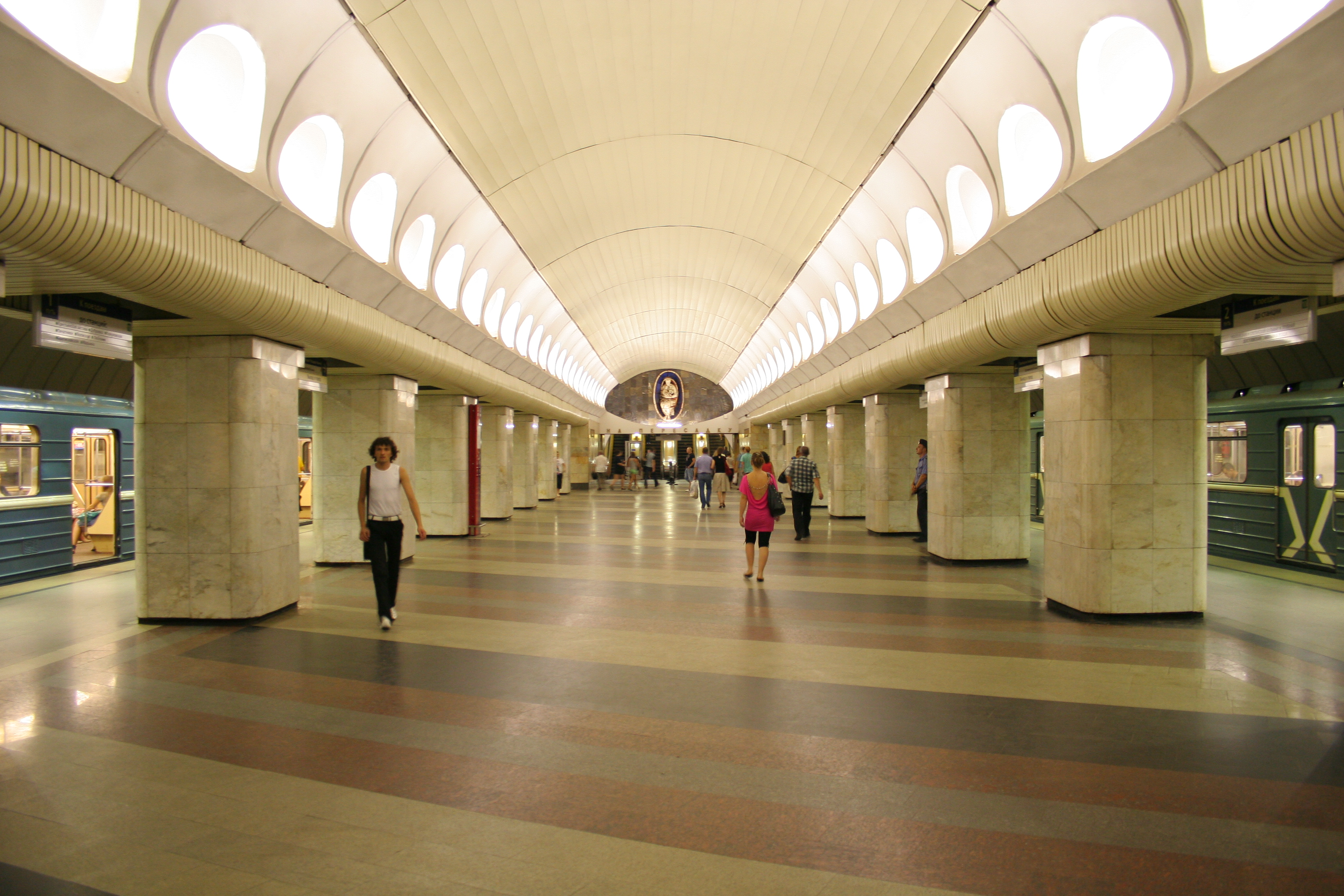

General information
- Location: Tagansky District, Central Administrative Okrug; Moscow; Russia
- Coordinates: 55.7463°N 37.6819°E
- System: Moscow Metro station
- Owner: Moskovsky Metropoliten
- Line: Lyublinsko-Dmitrovskaya line
- Platforms: 1 island platform
- Tracks: 2
- Connections: Bus: 40, 125, 730; Trolleybus: 45, 53; Tram: 8, 12, 46

Construction
- Depth: 54 metres (177 ft)
- Platform levels: 1
- Parking: No

Other information
- Station code: 152

History
- Opened: 28 December 1995; 30 years ago

Services
Preceding station	Moscow Metro	Following station
Chkalovskaya towards Fiztekh	Lyublinsko-Dmitrovskaya line	Krestyanskaya Zastava towards Zyablikovo
Marksistskaya towards Tretyakovskaya	Kalininsko-Solntsevskaya line (Kalininsky radius) transfer at Ploshchad Ilyicha	Aviamotornaya towards Novokosino
Route map
Location
- Location within Moscow Metro

Rimskaya (Russian: Римская) is a Moscow Metro station in the Tagansky District, Central Administrative Okrug, Moscow. It is on the Lyublinsko-Dmitrovskaya Line, between Chkalovskaya and Krestyanskaya Zastava stations.

Rimskaya opened on 28 December 1995 as part of the original stage of the Lyublinsky radius the station was named after the Italian capital Rome, and the architects L.Popov and N.Rostegnyaeva applied the theme accordingly.

The station is a unique and an unusual project where a column-trivault design is applied but with no underplatform spacing and all of the infrastructure sitting on a massive monolithic plate. Located on a depth of 54 metres. The wide square columns are faced with grey marble as are the walls. The ceiling is hinged and is made of aluminium. Black, red, grey and white granite slants are used for the floor. The real decorations come from the Italian sculpturers (G.Imbrighi, A.Quattrocchi and L.Berlin) including a fountain (which currently is non-functioning due to the problems caused by the dampening of air) with typical Roman columns and a child sculpture in the far end of the central hall and four medallions including a she-wolf, Romulus, Remus and a triumphal archway in Rome.

== Transfers ==
The station is a transfer to the Ploshchad Ilicha of the Kalininskaya Line which is carried out by walkways from the sides of the central hall. The station's vestibule is located under Rogozhskaya Zastava square.
