= Krestyanskaya Zastava =

Moscow Metro station

Krestyanskaya Zastava Крестьянская застава
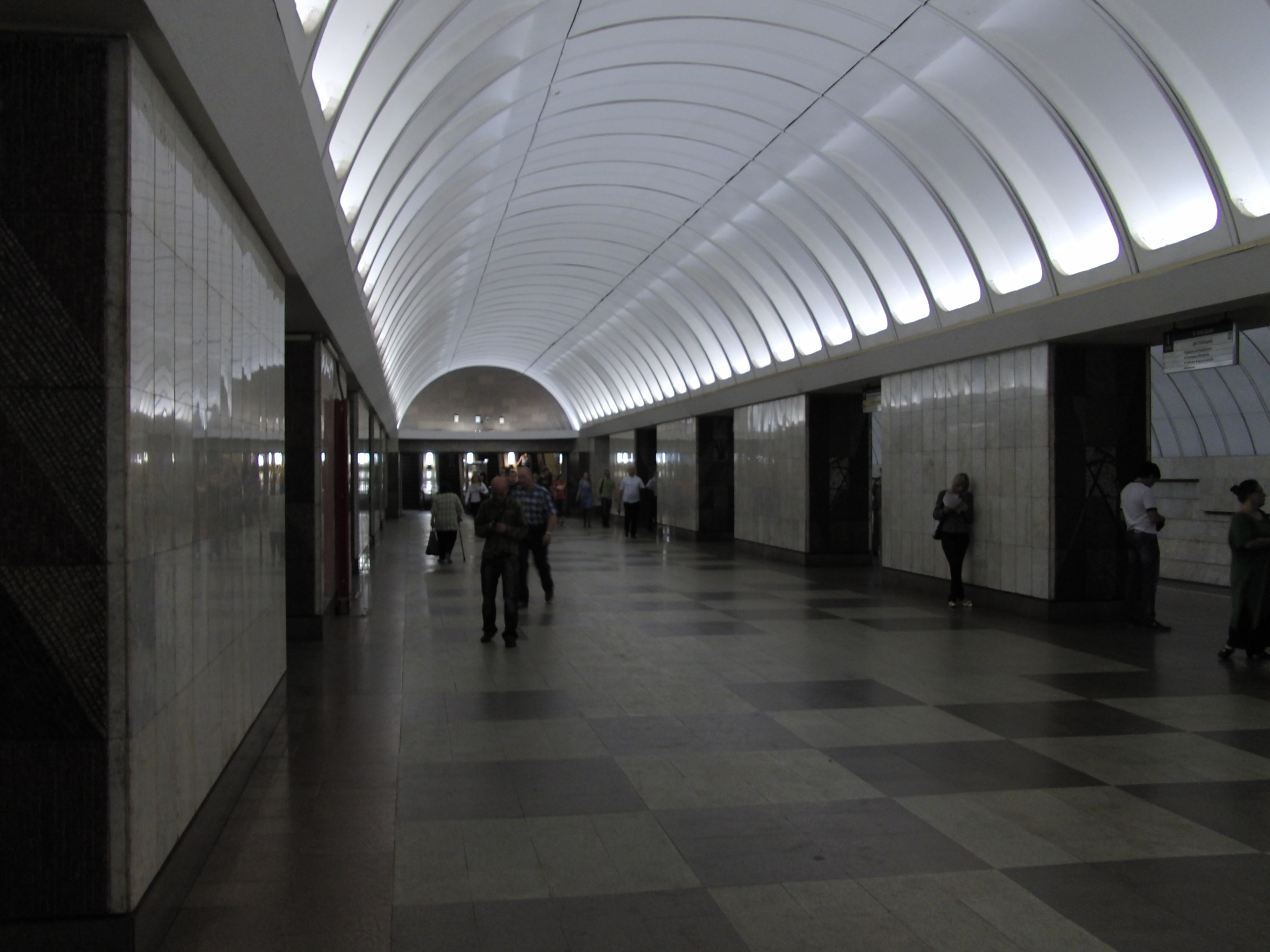

General information
- Location: Yuzhnoportovy District; South-Eastern Administrative Okrug; Moscow; Russia
- Coordinates: 55.7331°N 37.6673°E
- System: Moscow Metro station
- Owner: Moskovsky Metropoliten
- Line: Lyublinsko-Dmitrovskaya line
- Platforms: 1 island platform
- Tracks: 2
- Connections: Bus: 9, 299, 608; Trolleybus: 26; Tram: 2, 20, 35, 38, 40, 43, 46

Construction
- Depth: 47 metres (154 ft)
- Platform levels: 1
- Parking: No

Other information
- Station code: 153

History
- Opened: 28 December 1995; 30 years ago

Services
Preceding station	Moscow Metro	Following station
Rimskaya towards Fiztekh	Lyublinsko-Dmitrovskaya line	Dubrovka towards Zyablikovo
Taganskaya towards Planernaya	Tagansko-Krasnopresnenskaya line transfer at Proletarskaya	Volgogradsky Prospekt towards Kotelniki
Route map
Location
- Location within Moscow Metro

Krestyanskaya Zastava (Russian: Крестьянская застава) is a Moscow Metro station in the Yuzhnoportovy District, Central Administrative Okrug, Moscow. It is on the Lyublinsko-Dmitrovskaya Line, between Rimskaya and Dubrovka stations. Krestyanskaya Zastava was opened on 28 December 1995 as part of the first stage of the Lyublinsky Radius.

Like its neighbour Rimskaya the station lacks an underplatform service areas and rests on a monolithic plate. At a depth of 47 metres the station is tri-vault wall-columned (i.e. the intercolumned space has been filled up to give extra strength). The architects Nikolay Shumakov and Nataliya Shurygina applied a Peasant Labour theme to the decoration which included a bright marble and aluminium layout of the station and decorative mosaics at the ends of the columns (artists Nikolai Andronov and Yury Shishkov). The floor is covered in checkered pattern of black and grey granite and the lighting is hidden in the niches of the vault.

The station has one vestibule which is inter-linked with subways under the square for which the station is named. In 1997 a transfer was opened between the vestibule and the Proletarskaya station of the Tagansko-Krasnopresnenskaya Line.
