= Koltsevaya line =

Moscow Metro line

Koltsevaya line (Circle line)

Overview
- Locale: Moscow
- Stations: 12

Service
- Type: Rapid transit
- System: Moscow Metro
- Operator: Moskovsky Metropoliten
- Rolling stock: 81-775/776/777

History
- Opened: 1 January 1950; 76 years ago
- Last extension: 1954

Technical
- Line length: 19.4 km (12.1 mi)
- Character: Underground
- Track gauge: 1,520 mm (4 ft 11 27/32 in)
- Electrification: Third rail

The Koltsevaya line (Russian: Кольцева́я ли́ния, Ring line, IPA: [kəlʲtsɨˈvajə ˈlʲinʲɪjə]), also known as Line 5 or the Brown Line, is a line of the Moscow Metro. The line was built in 1950–1954 as a circle route orbiting central Moscow, and became crucial to the transfer patterns of passengers. The stations on the line were built at the height of Stalinist architecture, and include Komsomolskaya, Novoslobodskaya and Kiyevskaya.

== History ==
In the initial plans of the Metro's development, there was no provision for the Circle line. Instead it was planned for complete cross-city routes ("diameters") to cross the city centre with interchange stations at their intersections. However, after the opening of the second stage in 1938, it was clear from the excessive loads on those junctions, that this plan would be insufficient to deal with the growing number of passengers as the system expanded. An urban legend suggests that Joseph Stalin himself suggested the line when he placed a coffee cup on the original development map (with no ring) and then lifting it and leaving a circular stain around the centre of the city and said "It's your main fault, it should be built". It is thought this is the reason for the line's brown colour on all metro maps.

In principle, the alignment of the ring was also debated, whether to use the Garden Ring avenue that encircles the centre or a wider circumference. In the end, it was decided to partially align the southern path along the Sadovoye Koltso, and let the northern part deviate to connect most of Moscow's rail terminals. This solved a major logistical problem, because, due to the layout of Russia's railroads, it would be impossible to travel from a region on one side of Moscow to another without having to make a manual transfer from one terminal to another.

Construction began shortly after the end of the war. The first stage was opened in 1950 from Park Kultury to Kurskaya. In 1952, a second segment completed the northern deviation up to Belorusskaya and in 1954, the circumference was linked.

The construction of the ring allowed for massive changes in the passenger flow patterns around Moscow and allowed a systematic development platform for many future lines. A total of seven radial lines began at the ring, four of which later linked up in the centre to become diameters.

=== Timeline ===
Segment	Date opened	Length
Park Kultury – Kurskaya	1 January 1950	6.5 km
Kurskaya – Belorusskaya	30 January 1952	7.0 km
Belorusskaya – Park Kultury	14 March 1954	5.9 km
Total		19.4 km

=== Name changes ===
Station	Previous name(s)	Years
Park Kultury	Tsentralnyi Park Kultury i Otdykha Imeni Gorkogo	1950–1980
Oktyabrskaya	Kaluzhskaya	1950–1961
Dobryninskaya	Serpukhovskaya	1950–1961
Prospekt Mira	Botanicheskiy Sad	1952–1966

== Stations ==
The Koltsevaya line, unlike other lines of Moscow Metro, does not service any stations that belong to that line exclusively; rather, all its stations are transfer stations, linking to other lines, as shown below:

Station Name		Transfers
English	Russian	Transfers
↑ Loop line towards Park Kultury ↑
Kiyevskaya	Киевская	Kiyevskaya; Kiyevskaya
Krasnopresnenskaya	Краснопресненская	Barrikadnaya
Belorusskaya	Белорусская	Belorusskaya; Belorusskaya
Novoslobodskaya	Новослободская	Mendeleyevskaya
Dostoevskaya	Достоевская	Dostoevskaya
Prospekt Mira	Проспект Мира	Prospekt Mira
Komsomolskaya	Комсомольская	Komsomolskaya; Kalanchyovskaya
Kurskaya	Курская	Kurskaya; Chkalovskaya; Kurskaya
Taganskaya	Таганская	Taganskaya; Marksistskaya
Paveletskaya	Павелецкая	Paveletskaya
Dobryninskaya	Добрынинская	Serpukhovskaya
Oktyabrskaya	Октябрьская	Oktyabrskaya
Park Kultury	Парк культуры	Park Kultury
↓ Loop line towards Kiyevskaya ↓

== Rolling stock ==
The line is serviced by the Krasnaya Presnya depot (No.4) and was the first one to adopt the 81-717/714 model trains in 1978. But replacement of those models by the 81–740.4/81-741.4, which started operating in revenue service on the line since early 2010, was completed by 1 December 2011. Four 81-717/714 trains from the Krasnaya Presnya depot in 2011—2018 were in service on Filevskaya line. In 2020, brand new trains entered service and by June 2021, they completely replaced the 81-740.4/741.4 on the line.

Subway car types used on the line over the years:

Type	Dates
Series G	1950–1983
Series 81-717/714	1978–2011
Series 81-740.4/741.4	2009–2021
Series 81-775/776/777	2020–present

== Recent developments and future plans ==
Today the line is one of the busiest and the ever-rising passenger flows during rush hours are noticeably felt as most of the stations are over half a century old. In 1998, a second entrance was opened at Belorusskaya and there are plans to equip Park Kultury and Komsomolskaya with similar ones.

Many restoration works are carried out to improve the old line, recently Novoslobodskaya had major restoration work carried out, including replacement of lighting and retouching on the stained glass masterpieces by Pavel Korin. The vestibule of Taganskaya was closed in 2005 to replace old escalators and upgrade with new turnstiles and also cosmetically renovate it, this was re-opened in 2006, and shortly afterwards Dobryninskaya followed suit for a similar upgrade.

Despite the fact that when opened, there were six stations left for future transfer provisions, this turned out to be too small for the growing system. Metro planned two additional stations on the line Suvorovskaya, which connect to the Lyublinsko-Dmitrovskaya line and Rossiyskaya, which would connect to the Kalininsko-Solntsevskaya line. Some preliminary work had been performed on Suvorovskaya. In 2017, Metro terminated plans for both stations. A manager for the system indicated that the stations were unlikely to be completed as they were too technically complex, too long, and too costly to compete. Consequently, Vasiliev stated that the station was unlikely to be built. On August 19, 2019, works on Suvorovskaya station construction site resumed.
