= Kurskaya (Koltsevaya line) =

Moscow Metro station

Kurskaya Курская
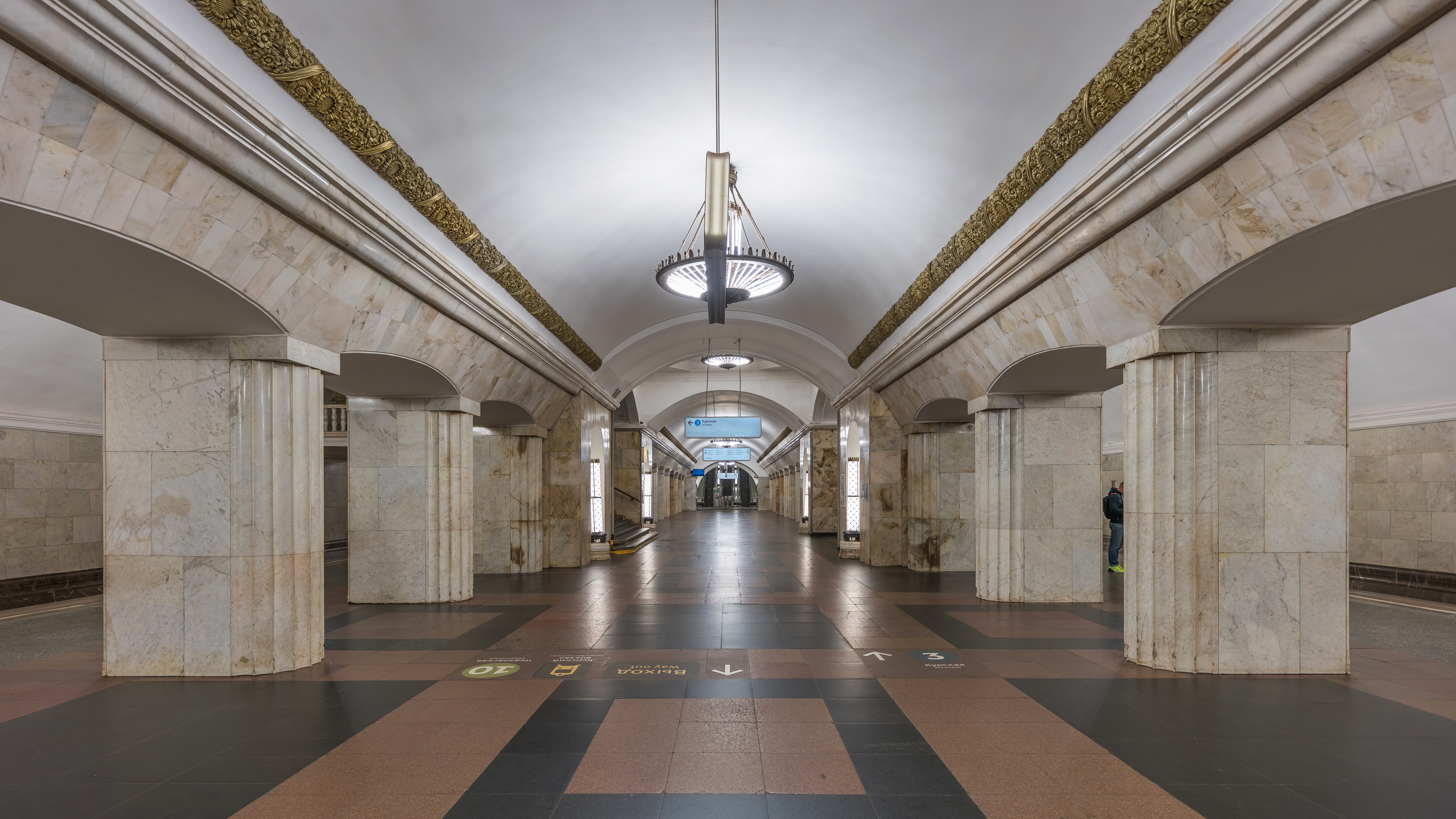

General information
- Location: Kursky railway station square Basmanny District; Central Administrative Okrug; Moscow; Russia
- Coordinates: 55.7570°N 37.6595°E
- System: Moscow Metro station
- Owner: Moskovsky Metropoliten
- Line: Koltsevaya line
- Platforms: 1 island platform
- Tracks: 2
- Connections: Bus: B, Bk, 40, 78; Tram: B, 20, 24

Construction
- Structure type: Pylon station
- Depth: 40 metres (130 ft)
- Platform levels: 1
- Parking: No

Other information
- Station code: 071, KU

History
- Opened: 1 January 1950; 76 years ago

Services
| Preceding station | Moscow Metro | Following station |
|---|---|---|
| Komsomolskaya anticlockwise / outer | Koltsevaya line | Taganskaya clockwise / inner |
| Ploshchad Revolyutsii towards Pyatnitskoye Shosse | Arbatsko-Pokrovskaya line transfer at Kurskaya | Baumanskaya towards Shchyolkovskaya |
| Sretensky Bulvar towards Fiztekh | Lyublinsko-Dmitrovskaya line transfer at Chkalovskaya | Rimskaya towards Zyablikovo |
Route map
Location
- Location within Central Moscow

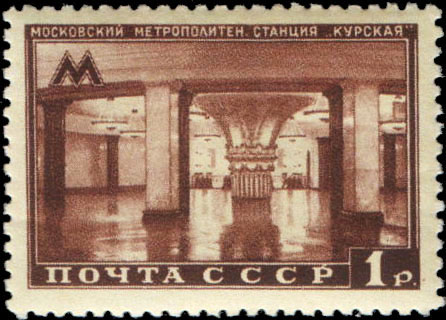
Kurskaya depicted on a 1950 USSR postage stamp

Kurskaya (Russian: Ку́рская) is a Moscow Metro station in the Basmanny District, Central Administrative Okrug, Moscow. It is on the Koltsevaya line, between Komsomolskaya and Taganskaya stations, and opened on 1 January 1950.

== Design ==
The station was designed by architects G. Zakharkov and Z. Chernysheva under the supervision of Ivan Zholtovsky who were awarded the Stalin Prize in 1950 for the design. Kurskaya is a rare deep column station built in the 1950s style of Stalinist Architecture.

The design features four rows of columns which support the vaults, though the columns are "doubled" hence their wide appearance. In the centre of the station is a large open space with a large vault topping it that rests on four pylons forming an arbour, from which a staircase leads off as a transfer to Kurskaya–Radialnaya of the Arbatsko–Pokrovskaya line. Another interesting detail of the station is the lack of sculptures and artwork, instead, however, this compensated by small details such as Torchiere (now removed) in the arbour which light the granite stairwell and hidden lamps in the niches of the vault, which is covered by a bronze frieze symbolising the dawn and blossoming of Mother Russia. Additional lighting is provided by eight elegant conical chandeliers with fluorescent tubes. The floor is laid with red and grey granite and the walls and columns with white koyelga marble.

The station's large vestibule is located right next to the north, and adjacent to Kursky railway station, hence the name of the station, and serves both the ring and radial stations, this contains a large circular underground lobby in the centre of which is a bronze sculpture of wheat (inclining Kursk as the centre of the Chernozem region), this is also linked to the 1938 vestibule of the Arbatsko-Pokrovskaya station, allowing for a transfer there. The interior of the surface structure, adorned with citations from the Anthem of the Soviet Union once contained a large statue of Joseph Stalin (by sculptor Nikolai Tomsky), this was removed in 1961. On 3 July 2008, the vestibule was closed for a year to replace escalators, upgrade and renovation. The station's second entrance to Zemlyanoy Val opened in December 1995, is a shared underground vestibule, which also doubles as a transfer to Chkalovskaya of the Lyublinskaya line.

Possibly the most interesting detail of the station is a large metallic plaque on the station wall, adorned with artwork has an inscription: Kurskaya, large ring, 1945–1949. This implies the original plan to have the Koltsevaya line follow the Garden Ring, and then a smaller ring line to follow the Boulevard Ring (the small ring).

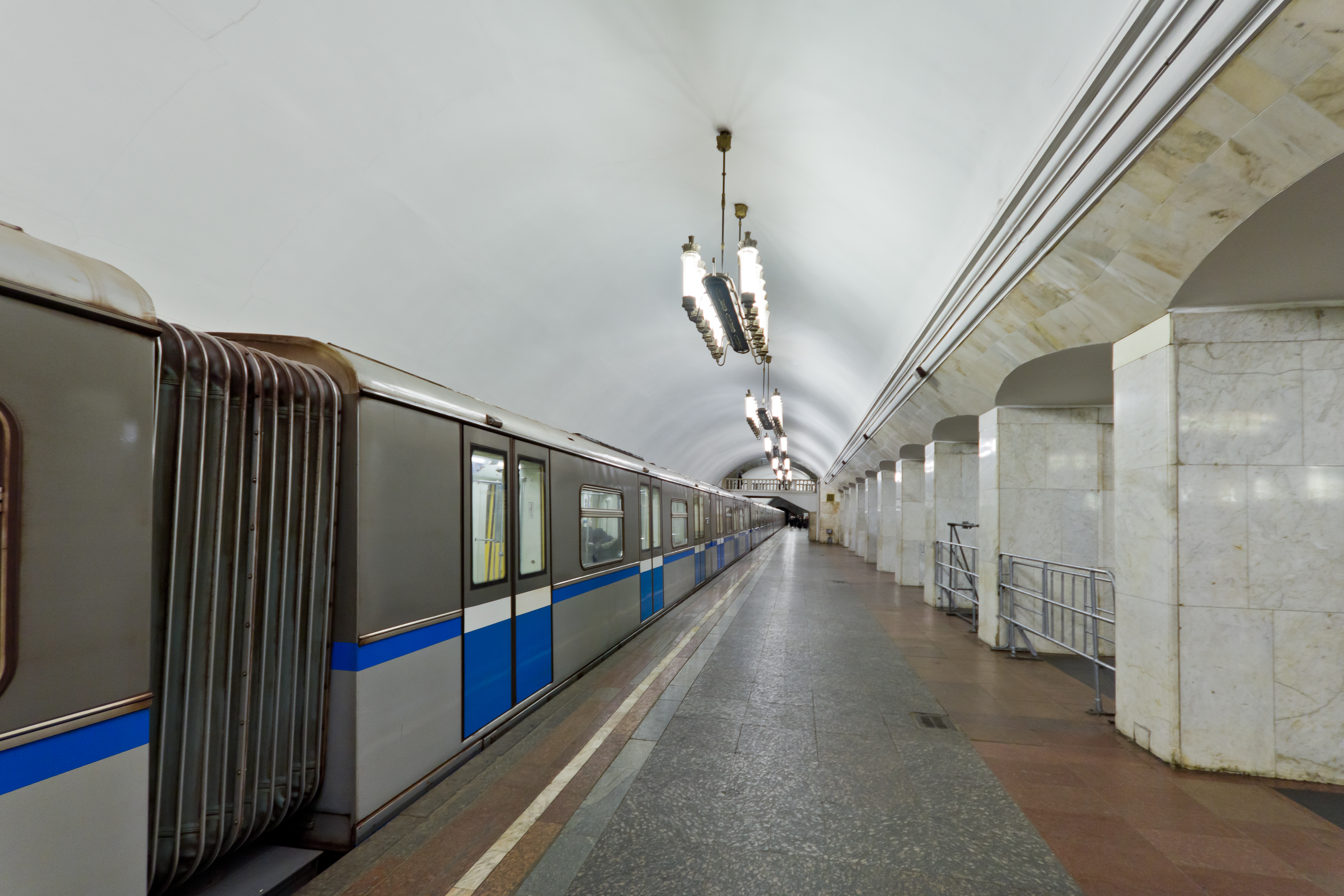
Station platform of Kurskaya
