= Paveletskaya (Koltsevaya line) =

Moscow Metro station

Paveletskaya Павелецкая
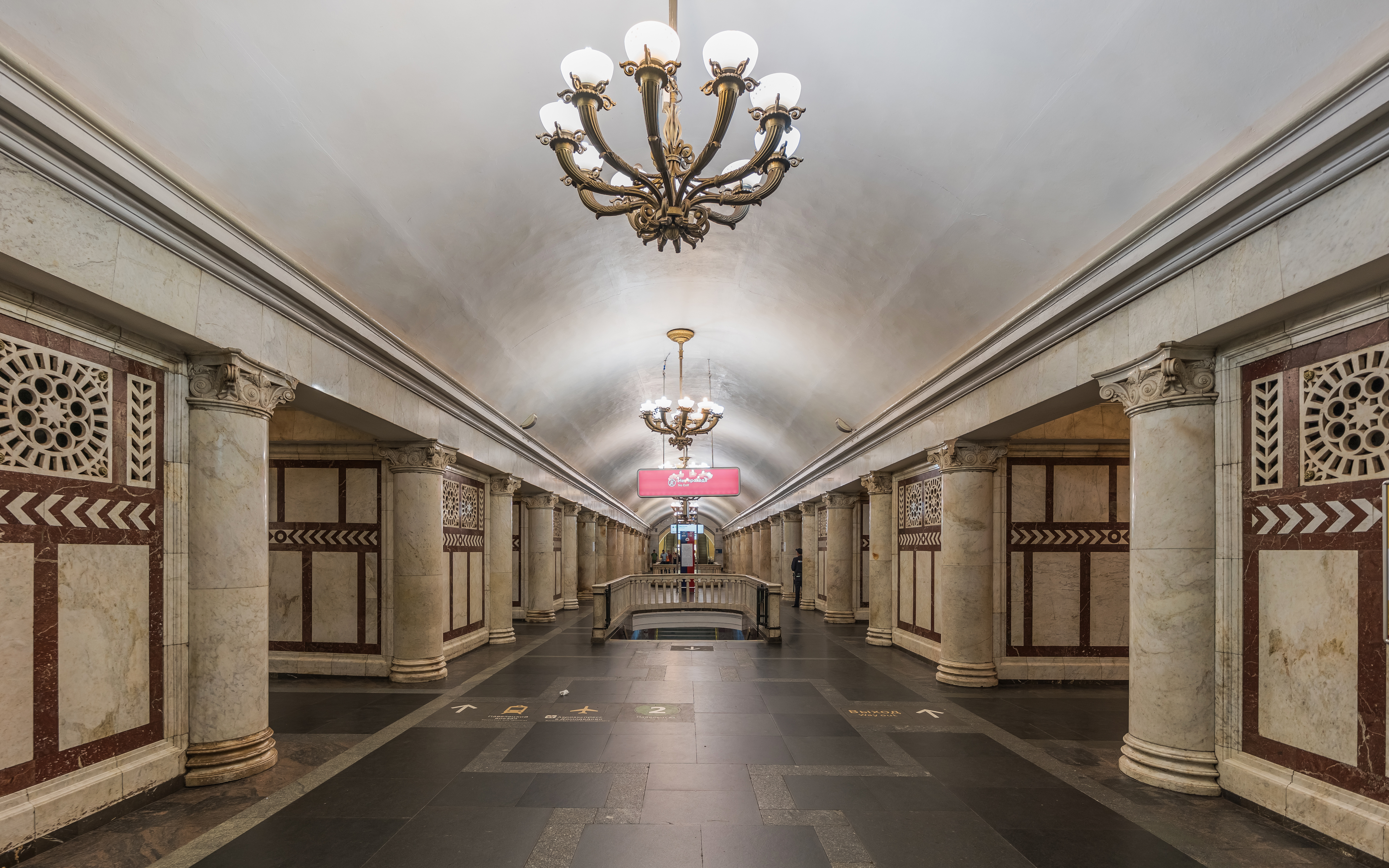

General information
- Location: Zamoskvorechye District; Central Administrative Okrug; Moscow; Russia
- Coordinates: 55.7318°N 37.6379°E
- System: Moscow Metro station
- Owner: Moskovsky Metropoliten
- Line: Koltsevaya line
- Platforms: 1 island platform
- Tracks: 2
- Connections: Tram: A, 3, 38, 39, Bus: Б, Бк, К, 13, 106, 158, 632, н8

Construction
- Structure type: Pylon station
- Depth: 40 metres (130 ft)
- Platform levels: 1
- Parking: No

Other information
- Station code: 073

History
- Opened: 1 January 1950; 76 years ago

Services
Preceding station	Moscow Metro	Following station
Taganskaya anticlockwise / outer	Koltsevaya line	Dobryninskaya clockwise / inner
Novokuznetskaya towards Khovrino	Zamoskvoretskaya line transfer at Paveletskaya	Avtozavodskaya towards Alma-Atinskaya
Route map
Location
- Location within Central Moscow

Paveletskaya (Russian: Павеле́цкая) is a station on the Koltsevaya line and Zamotskvoretskaya line of the Moscow Metro. Opened on 1 January 1950 as part of the first segment of the fourth stage, the station is a pylon-trivault built in the style of the late 1940/early 1950s Stalinist architecture to a design by architects Nikolai Kolli and I. Kasetl. The station's theme comes from the Paveletsky railway terminal from which trains depart towards the Volga Region. Thus agricultural influences are clearly seen, these include the square white koyelga marble columns decorated with red marble strips, flanked by marble columns with modern Ionic capitals. Bright bronze chandeliers provide lighting. The walls repeat the two tone marble, white on top, red on bottom, and the floor is laid with grey and white granite.

The station's vestibule is built into the corner of the Garden Ring and Zemlyannoy Val, and occupies the ground floor of the building there. Inside above the escalator is a circular mosaic panel by Pavel Korin Red Square which depicts the Lenin's Mausoleum and the Saint Basil's Cathedral, framed by a bas-relief with typical soviet banners and floral arrangements with names of Volga cities on the sides. The vestibule has another artwork by Iosif Rabinovich, which is a mosaic on the dome of the vestibule on the theme of the permanent end to drought in the Volga.

As the station was made to be a transfer point to Paveletskaya station of the Zamoskvoretskaya line, the vestibule was built as an entrance to both stations, however as the radial station of the Zamoskvoretskaya line was undergoing reconstruction the vestibule doubled as a transfer point. A direct corridor was opened only on 30 July 1955, which saw the addition of large staircases surrounded by marble balustrades in the centre of the platform. The other major change was that initially in the end of the station was a large medallion with image of Vladimir Lenin and Joseph Stalin, but during the 1961 de-Stalinization drive this was removed and instead replaced by the present artwork by Pavel Korin showing the Coat of Arms of the Soviet Union being held by a worker man and peasant woman amid floral backgrounds.

== Gallery ==
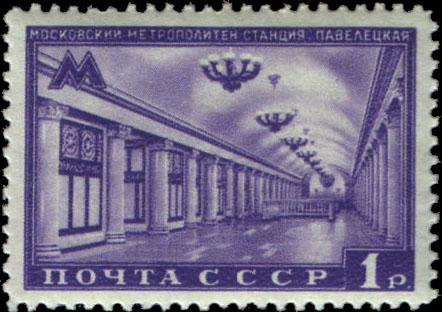
Image on a 1950 stamp

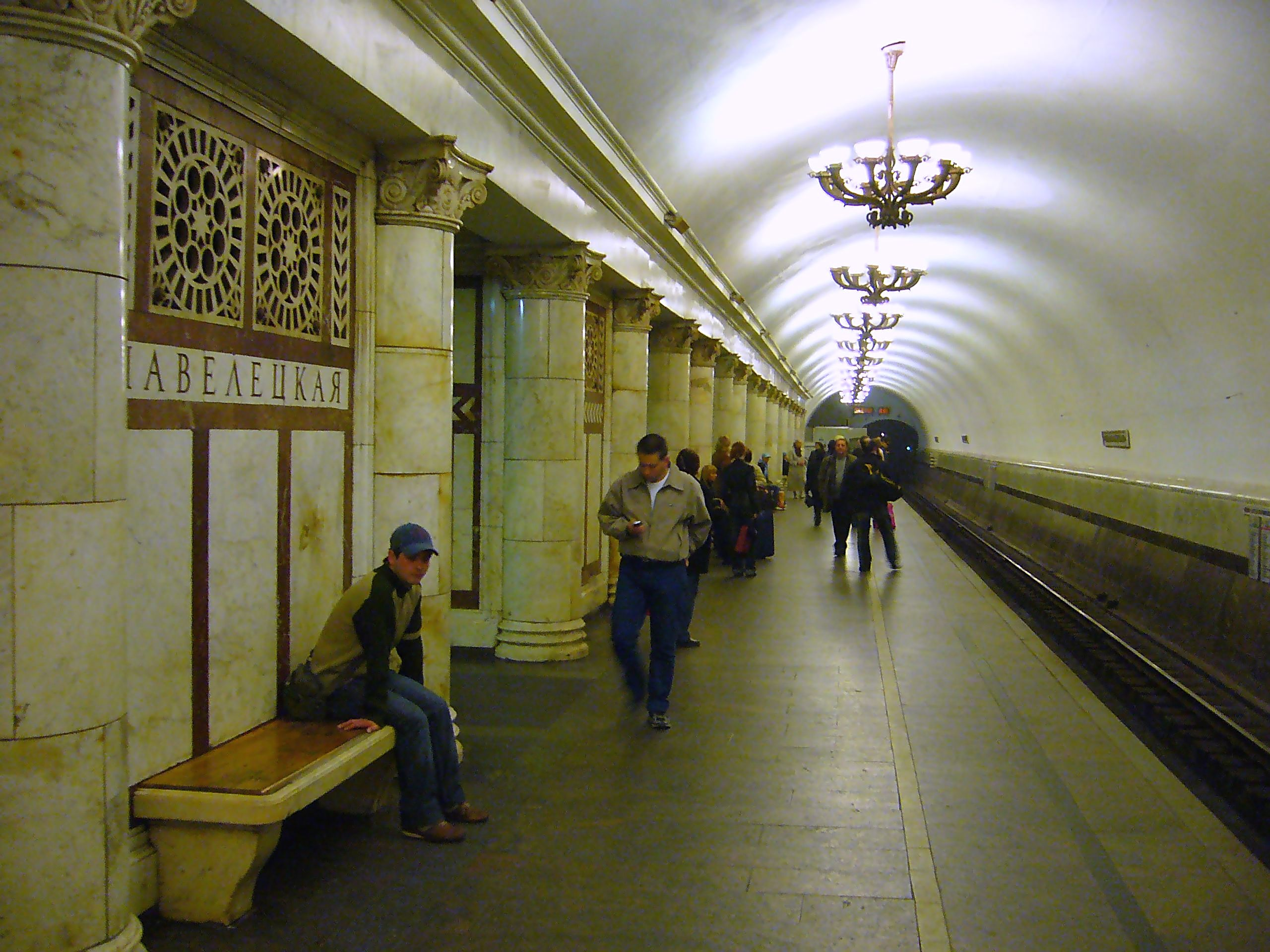
Station platform

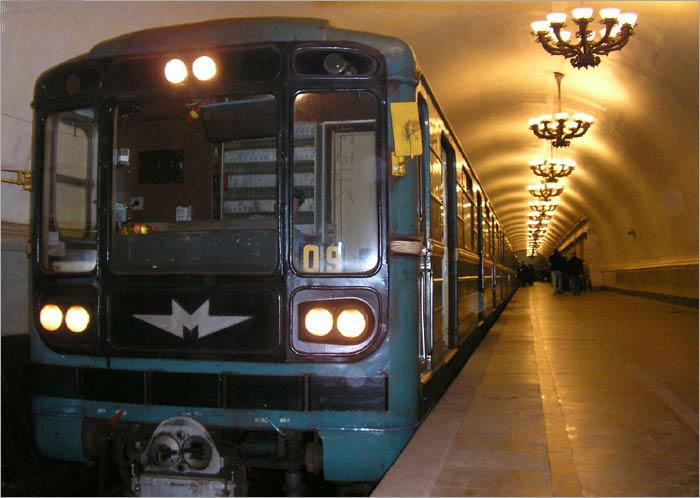
Station platform with 81-717/714
