= Proletarskaya (Moscow Metro) =

Moscow Metro station

Proletarskaya Пролетарская
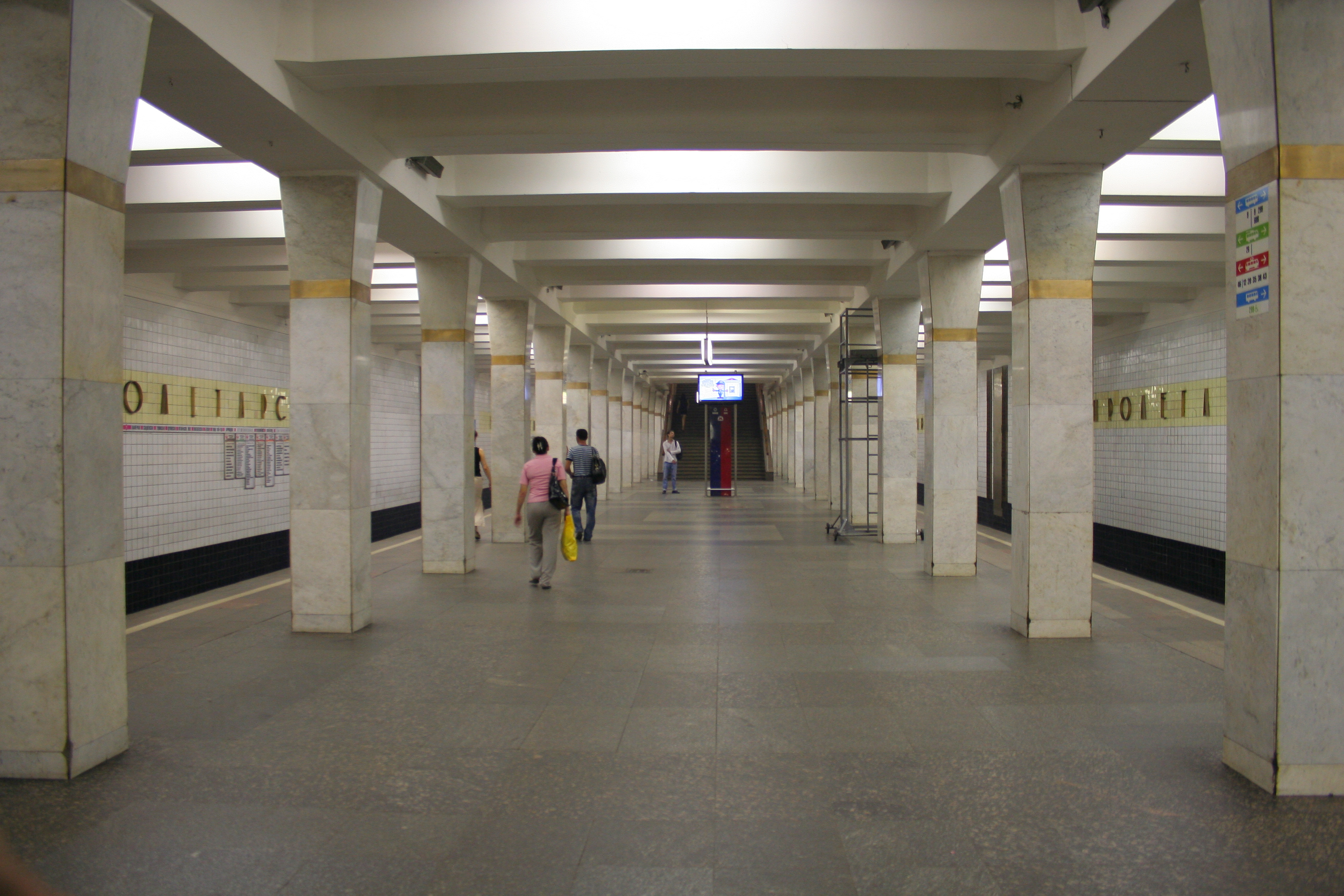

General information
- Location: Yuzhnoportovy District; South-Eastern Administrative Okrug
- Coordinates: 55.7319°N 37.6659°E
- System: Moscow Metro station
- Owner: Moskovsky Metropoliten
- Line: Tagansko-Krasnopresnenskaya line
- Platforms: 1 island platform
- Tracks: 2
- Connections: Bus: n5 (night), 012, t27, p46, e80, 766, c835, 984; Tram: A, 38, 43

Construction
- Depth: 9 metres (30 ft)
- Platform levels: 1
- Parking: No

Other information
- Station code: 115

History
- Opened: 31 December 1966; 59 years ago

Services
Preceding station	Moscow Metro	Following station
Taganskaya towards Planernaya	Tagansko-Krasnopresnenskaya line	Volgogradsky Prospekt towards Kotelniki
Rimskaya towards Fiztekh	Lyublinsko-Dmitrovskaya line transfer at Krestyanskaya Zastava	Dubrovka towards Zyablikovo
Route map
Location
- Location within Moscow Metro

Proletarskaya (Russian: Пролетарская) is a Moscow Metro station in Yuzhnoportovy District, South-Eastern Administrative Okrug, Moscow. It is on the Tagansko-Krasnopresnenskaya Line, between Taganskaya and Volgogradsky Prospekt stations. Proletarskaya opened on 31 December 1966 as part of the Zhadovskiy radius. The station is a typical of the 1960s column tri-span functional design and like many stations built at the time lacks the design and decorative innovations that some of the more famous Moscow Metro stations exhibit. The architects Yuliya Kolesnikova and Yury Vdovin applied a bright theme. The pillars (slightly widening at the top) are revetted with white marble, whilst the floor is covered with grey granite of various tones and with labradorite. The walls are faced with glazed ceramic tiles of white and black (below platform level), which have decorations in the form of hammer and sickles made from anodized aluminium. The station has underground vestibules interlinked with subways under the Krestyanskaya Zastava Square with entrances covered by glazed concrete pavilions. In 1997 a footbridge was built over the northbound line, which serves as a third exit to the common vestibule with the station Krestyanskaya Zastava of the Lyublinsko-Dmitrovskaya Line and also acts as a transfer point. Currently the station has a passenger traffic of 61860 via surface and 120300 via the transfer.

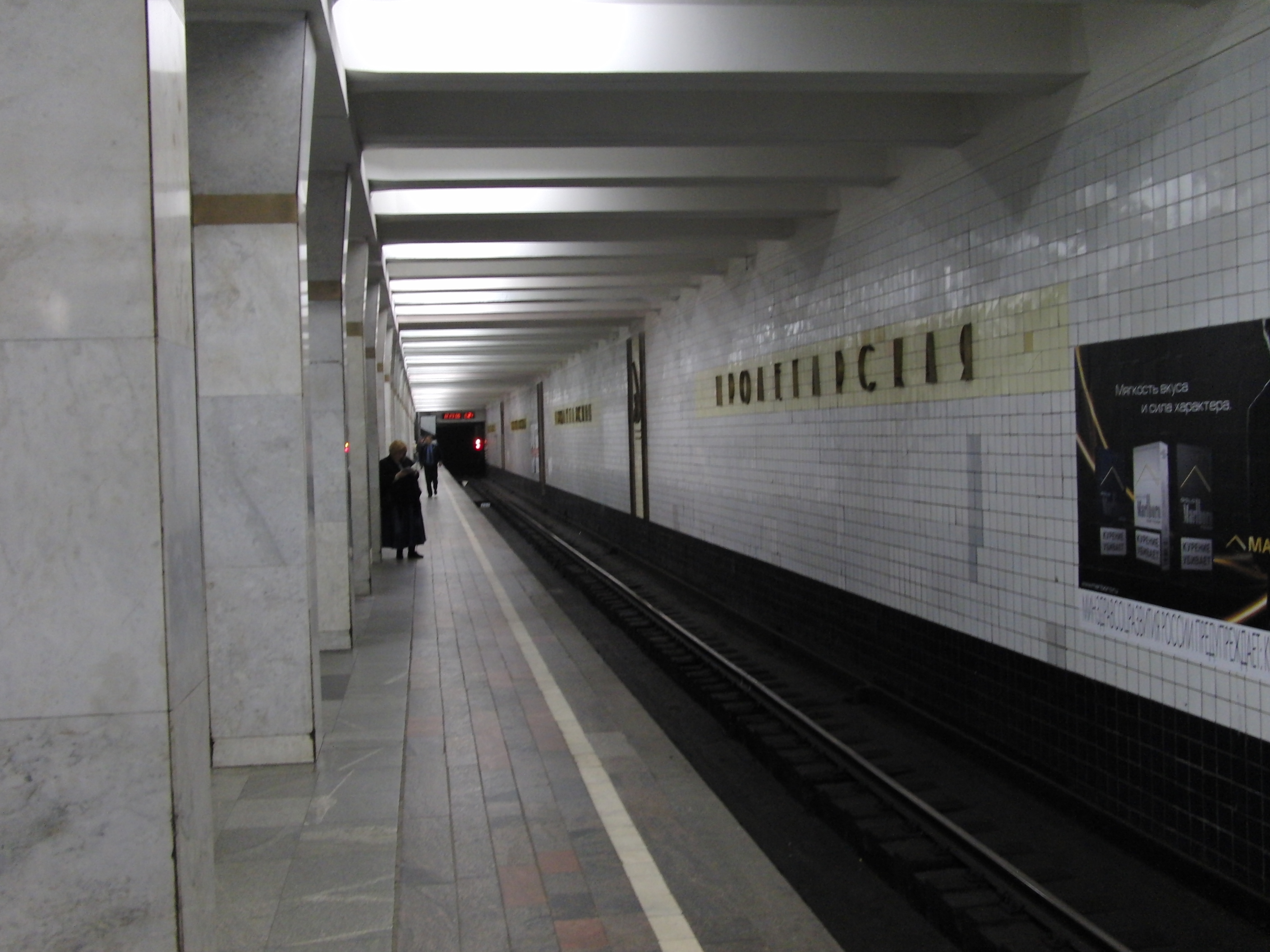
Station platform
