= Tagansky District =

District of Moscow, Russia

Coordinates: 55°44′29″N 37°39′15″E

Tagansky District in Moscow

Tagansky District (Russian: Тага́нский райо́н) is a district of Central Administrative Okrug of the federal city of Moscow, Russia, located between the Moskva and Yauza Rivers near the mouth of the latter. Population: 116,744 (2010 census); 109,993 (2002 census).

== Name ==
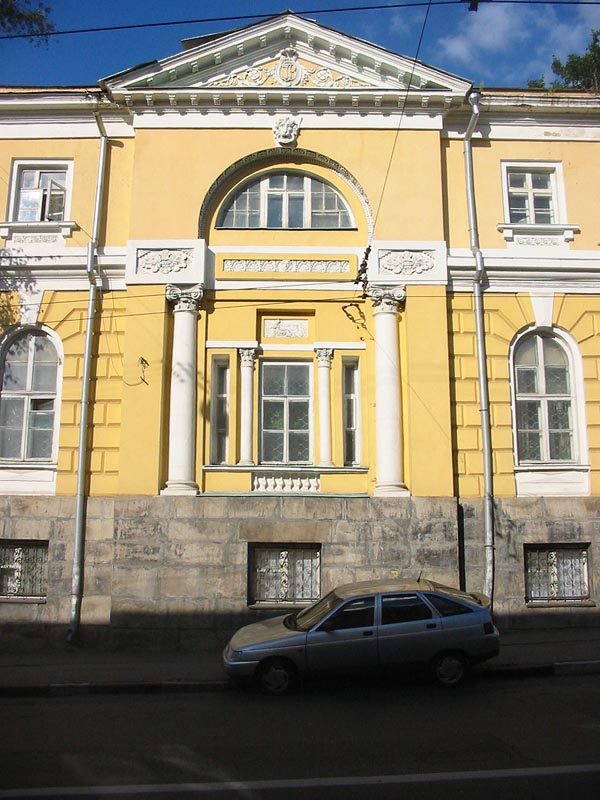
The outbuilding of the Yauza hospital (at the beginning of the 19th century – the estate of I.R. Batashev)

The district takes its name from the former Taganskaya sloboda, where the copper-smiths lived in the 16th century. Tagan is the old Russian word for their product, a trivet to set a pot on (known in English as "brand-iron").

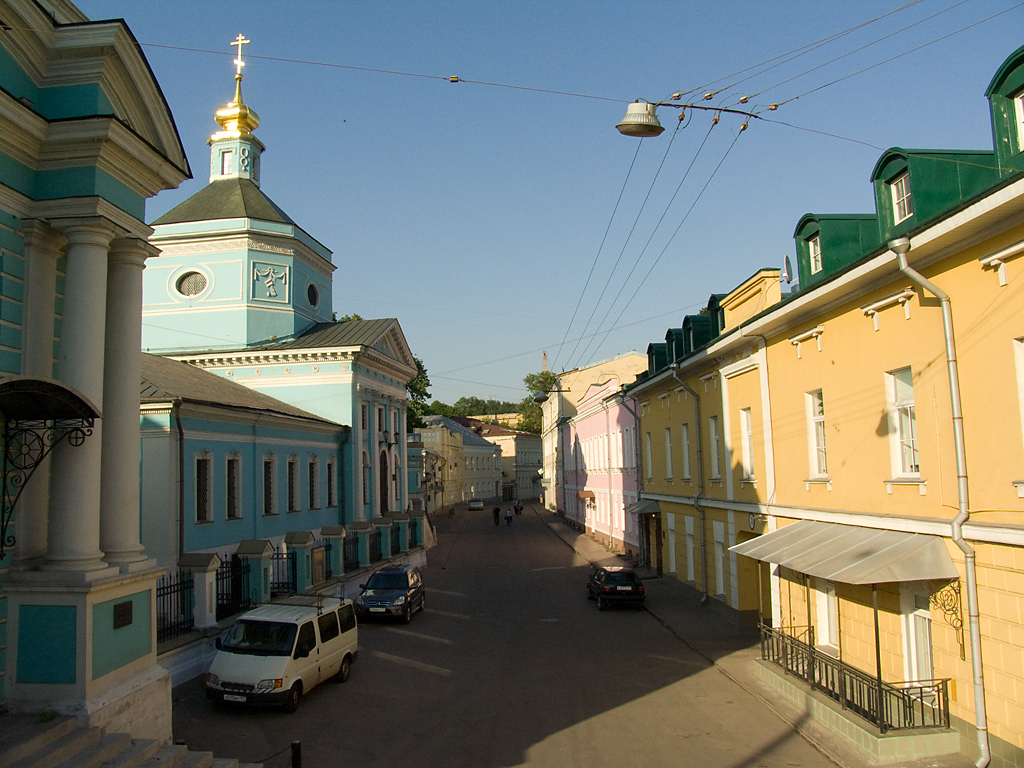
A historic street in the Taganka District

== History ==
=== 14th–19th centuries ===
The city of Moscow expanded beyond the boundaries of the Kremlin and Zaryadye at the turn of the 14th and 15th centuries. Around the same time, settlement began on the left bank of the Yauza River, primarily by artisans who were relocated from the city due to the fire hazards associated with their trades, such as potters and blacksmiths.
In the 16th century, the rapidly growing blacksmiths' settlement pushed the potters' community to the eastern part of what is now Goncharnaya Street, which emerged as a branch off the main Kolomenskaya Road.

In the mid-17th century, the population density in Zayauzye became one of the highest in Moscow. At that time, Zayauzye was bordered to the east by the Earthen Rampart, with the only gate located at Taganskaya Square. A market formed there, known as Tagansky Market, where most of the stalls in the 17th century were run by the streltsy.

In the fire of 1812, Zayauzye burned down almost completely. In the Yauza part of the district, 36 houses remained, in Rogozhskaya - 63, in Taganskaya - only 13. The fire of 1886 almost completely destroyed Rogozhskaya sloboda subdistrict. Reconstruction of the area took place slowly, without any plan.

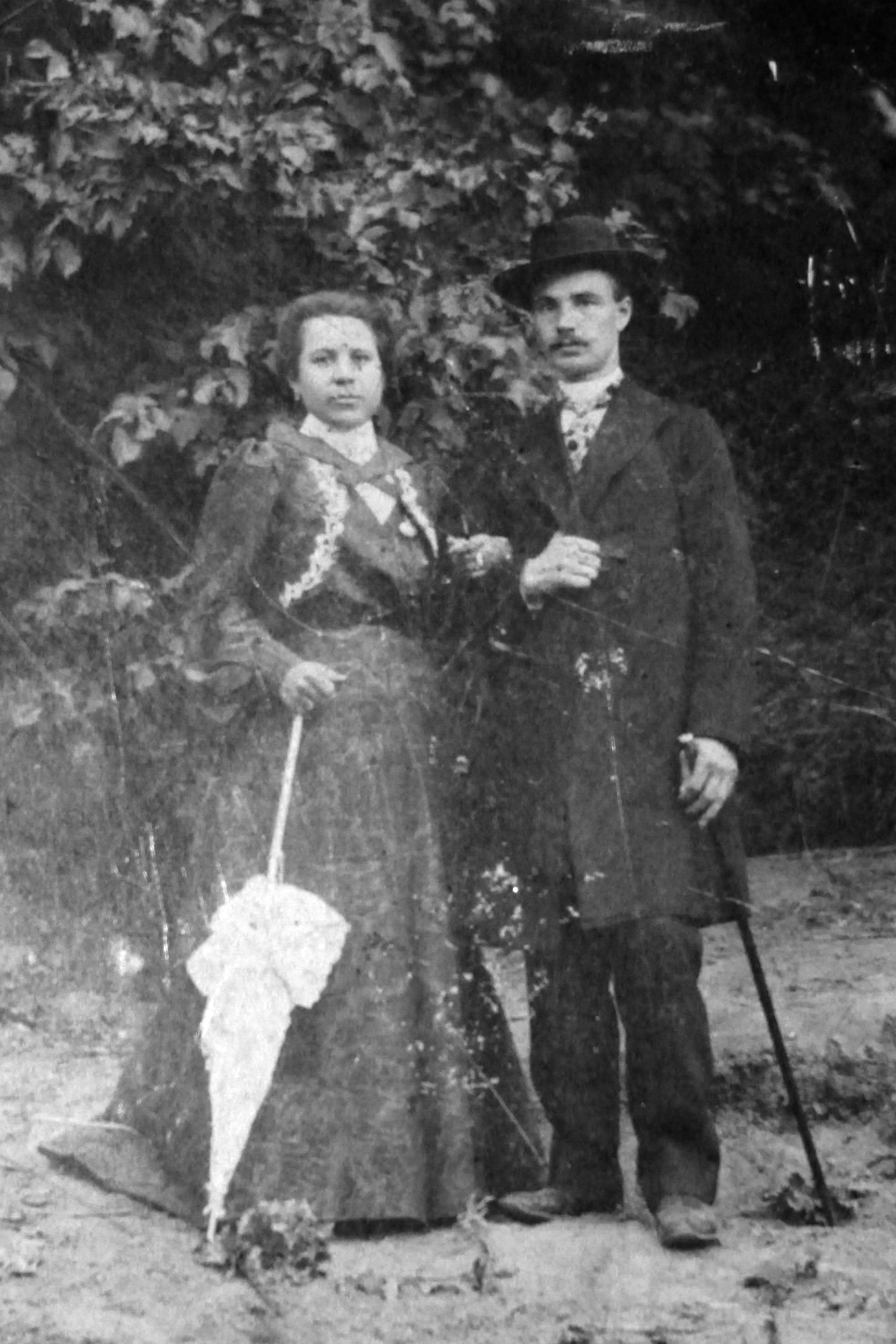
Residents of Taganka, Matvey and Pelageya Kochetkov. Early 20th century.

=== Great October Revolution - World War II ===
The first residential building built in Moscow after the revolution appeared on Taganka. On October 14, 1923, the Dynamo plant building, No. 9 Sorokosvyatskaya Street, renamed Dynamovskaya in 1924, was ceremoniously occupied.

The most visible contribution of the pre-war decade to the architectural appearance of Taganka was the development of the embankments and the new Bolshoy Ustinsky and Bolshoy Krasnokholmsky Bridges.

== The modern district of Taganka ==
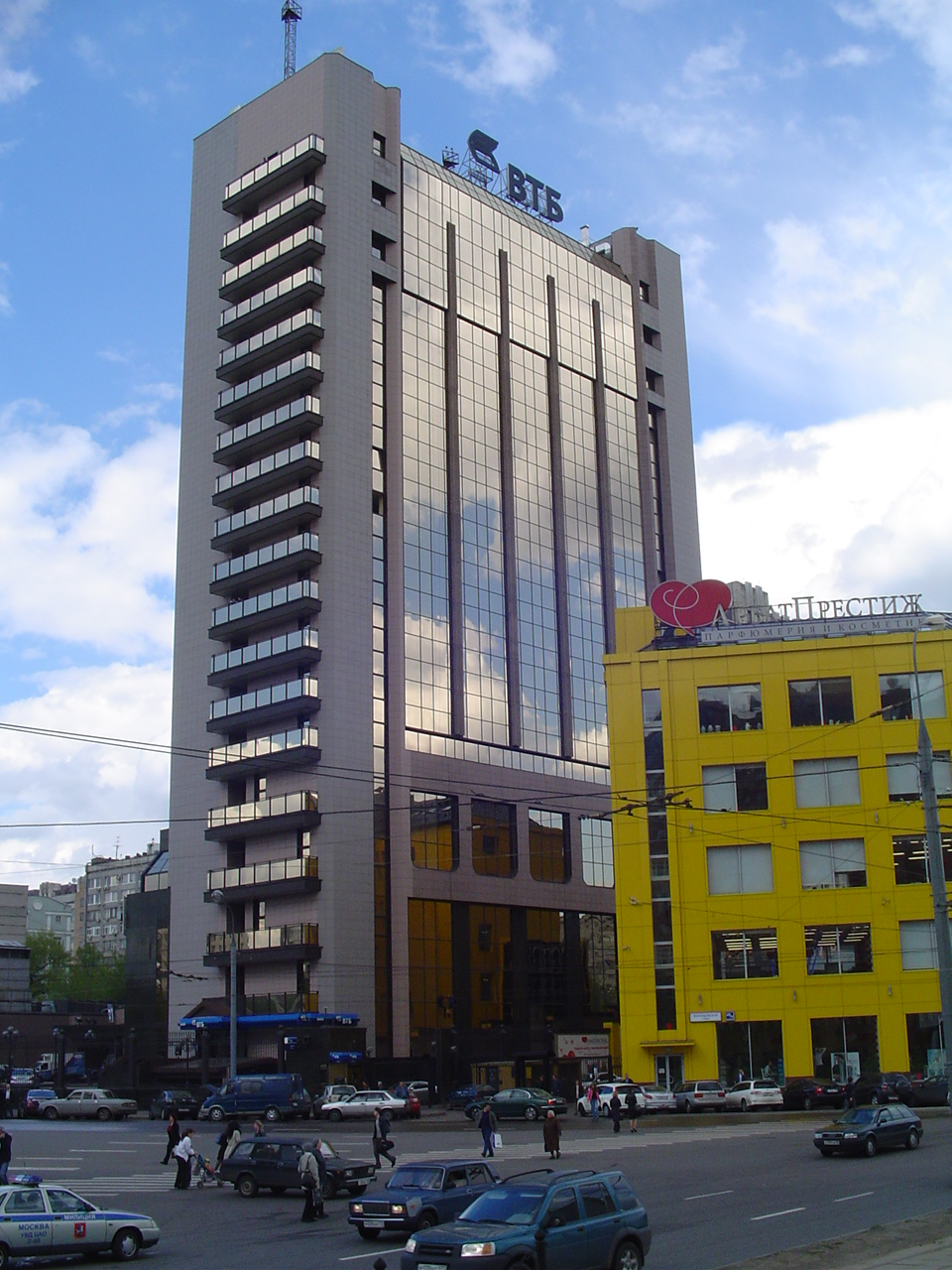
VTB Bank building

The modern center of the Taganka district is the Taganskaya Square, where the Taganka Theatre is located. The skyline is dominated by the Kotelnicheskaya Embankment Building, once the tallest skyscraper in the Soviet Union. The area contains a fine set of pre-Petrine parish churches, including the Athonite metochion and the Bolvanovka Church of St. Nicholas.

Apart from Taganka proper, the modern district includes other historic neighbourhoods such as Kulishki in the eastern Bely Gorod, Khitrovka, Solyanka, Krutitsy, and Rogozhskaya sloboda (the spiritual centre of Old Believers). Major sights include the 18th-century Foundling Home and at least three walled monasteries — the Andronikov, the Pokrovsky, and the Novospassky.
