= Central Administrative Okrug =

Central Administrative Okrug Центра́льный администрати́вный о́круг
- Administrative okrug of Moscow
- Flag Coat of arms
- Central Administrative Okrug in Moscow
- Coordinates: 55°45′N 37°37′E
- Country: Russia
- Federal city: Moscow
- Districts: 10 + Kitai-gorod

Area
  - Total: 66.1755 km^{2} (25.5505 sq mi)

Population (2021)
  - Total: 772,258
- Website: http://cao.mos.ru/

Central Administrative Okrug, or Tsentralny Administrativny Okrug (Russian: Центра́льный администрати́вный о́круг, Tsentralny administrativny okrug), is one of the twelve administrative okrugs of Moscow, Russia. Population: 772,258 (2021 census); 741,967 (2010 census); 701,353 (2002 census); . It is the core of the city that includes its oldest, historical parts: Kremlin and the former Bely Gorod and Zemlyanoy Gorod; with certain churches and fortifications as old as from the 14th to 15th century. It is also the site of Russia's highest government institutions, such as the Government house, the State Duma, the Federation Council, and most ministries. A large part of the territory is occupied by office buildings, especially in the "Moscow-City" business district on the west side of the Okrug.

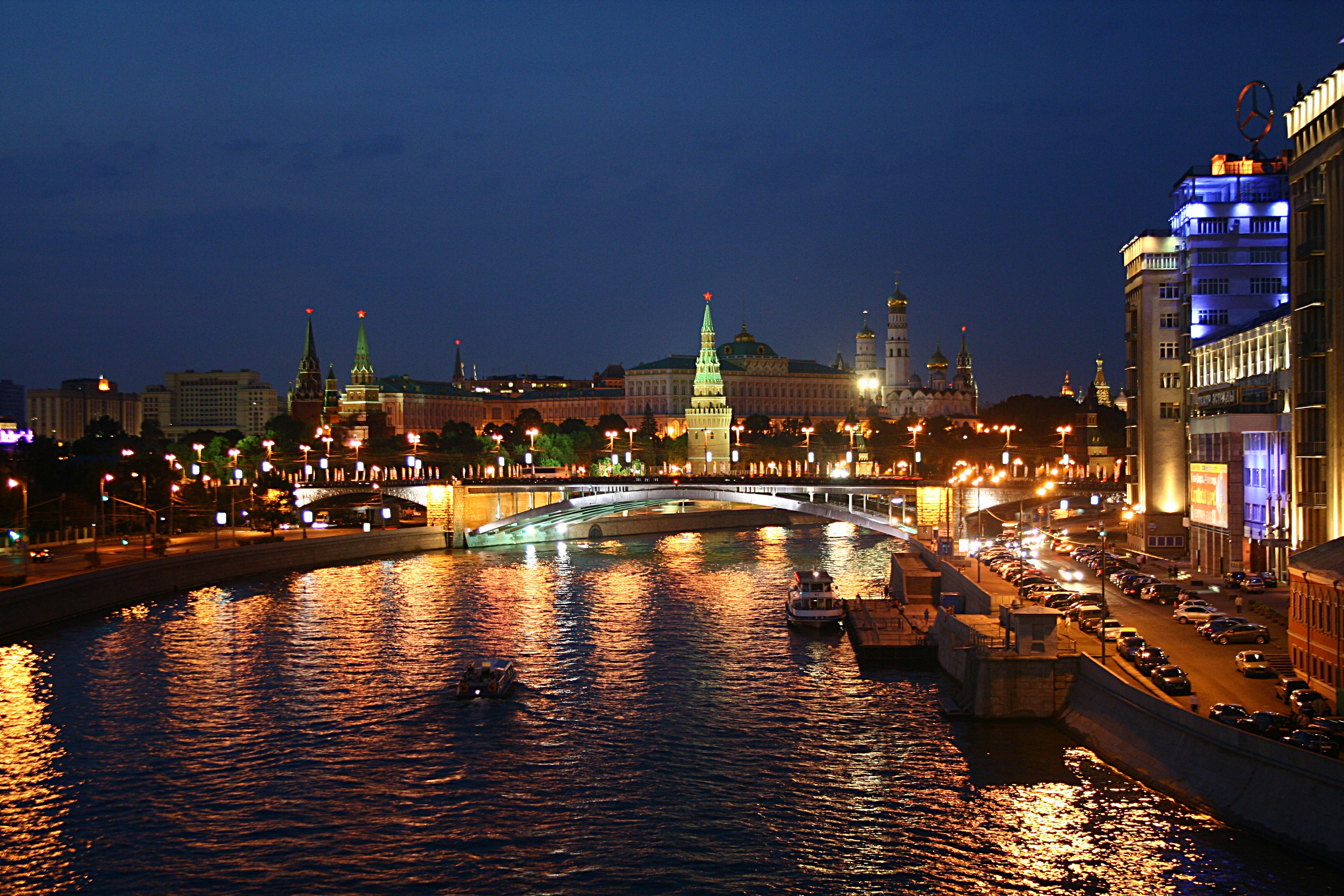
Kremlin at night.

== Territorial organisation ==
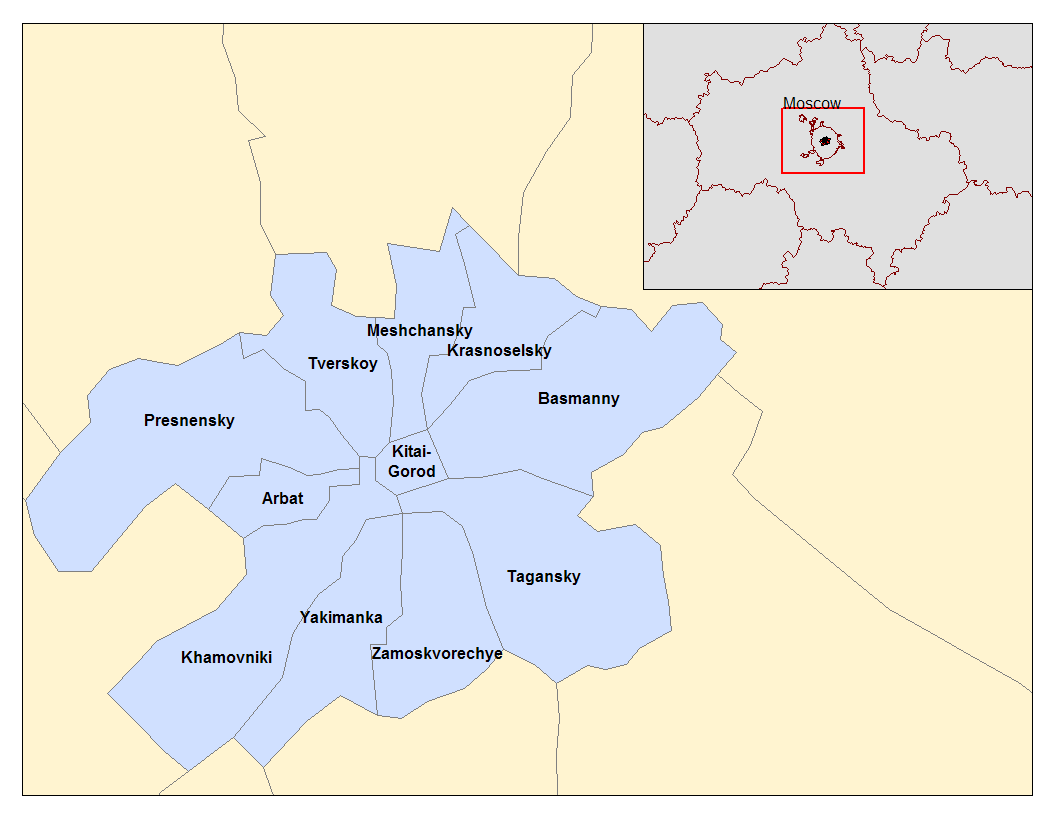
Map of territorial entities in the okrug

The okrug, governed by the prefecture, encompasses ten districts. The territory of Kitai-gorod is not a part of any district and is governed by the administrative okrug directly. As other okrugs, it was formally established in 1991. Its OKATO number is 45 286 000 000.

Districts under the jurisdiction of the Central Administrative Okrug
Name	Russian name	Population
Arbat	Арбат	25,699
Basmanny	Басманный	100,899
Khamovniki	Хамовники	97,110
Krasnoselsky	Красносельский	45,229
Meshchansky	Мещанский	56,077
Presnensky	Пресненский	116,979
Tagansky	Таганский	109,993
Tverskoy	Тверской	75,955
Yakimanka	Якиманка	22,822
Zamoskvorechye	Замоскворечье	50,590
TOTAL - Central Administrative Okrug	Центральный административный округ, Tsentralny administrativny okrug	701,353

== Coat of arms ==
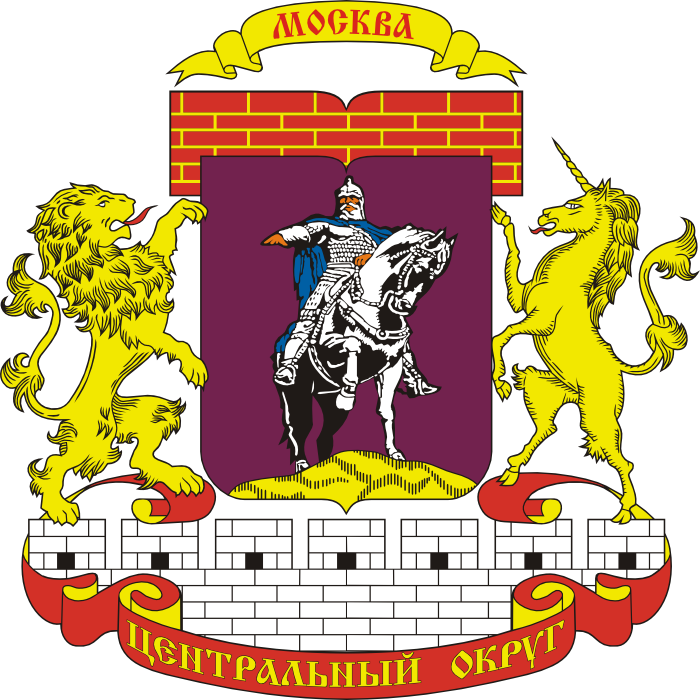
Coat of arms of Central Administrative Okrug

The Kremlin Hill, from which the colonization of Moscow began, is depicted under Yury Dolgoruky. The purple background symbolizes the supreme power of Russia, concentrated in Central Administrative Okrug. The gold unicorn was a traditional symbol of the Russian Tsars. Below him an ancient Kremlin white-stone wall is featured.

== Government and infrastructure ==
The Interstate Aviation Committee (IAC or MAK), the aviation accident technical investigation body of the Commonwealth of Independent States, has its head office in the Yakimanka District in the okrug. The Federal Penitentiary Service has its head office in Yakimanka District.

The Ministry of Education and Science has its head office in the Tverskoy District.

== Economy ==
Aeroflot has its head office in the Arbat District in the okrug. United Aircraft Corporation has its head office in the Krasnoselsky District in the okrug. Tupolev has its head office in the Basmanny District in the okrug.

The All Nippon Airways Moscow sales office is located in the Presnensky District in the okrug. Korean Air operates its CIS office in the Tverskoy District in the okrug.

== Education ==
The Lycée Français Alexandre Dumas de Moscou, a French international school, is located in the Krasnoselsky District in the okrug.

== Sister cities ==
- Daugavpils, Latvia
- Riga, Latvia
- Ingolstadt, Bavaria, Germany

== See also ==
- Prechistenka street
