= Dubrovka (Lyublinsko-Dmitrovskaya line) =

Moscow Metro station

Dubrovka Дубровка

General information
- Location: Yuzhnoportovy District; South-Eastern Administrative Okrug; Moscow; Russia
- Coordinates: 55.7186°N 37.6760°E
- System: Moscow Metro station
- Owner: Moskovsky Metropoliten
- Line: Lyublinsko-Dmitrovskaya line
- Platforms: 1 island platform
- Tracks: 2
- Connections: Bus: с799, 766, м79 Tram: 43

Construction
- Depth: 62 metres (203 ft)
- Platform levels: 1
- Parking: No

Other information
- Station code: 161

History
- Opened: 11 December 1999; 26 years ago

Services
Preceding station	Moscow Metro	Following station
Krestyanskaya Zastava towards Fiztekh	Lyublinsko-Dmitrovskaya line	Kozhukhovskaya towards Zyablikovo
Out-of-station interchange
Ugreshskaya anticlockwise / outer	Moscow Central Circle transfer at Dubrovka	Avtozavodskaya clockwise / inner
Route map
Location
- Location within Moscow Metro

Dubrovka (Russian: Дубровка) is a station on the Moscow Metro's Lyublinsko–Dmitrovskaya line. Originally the station was to open along with the first stage of the Lyublinsky radius in 1995. However, it could not be opened because of problems with building an escalator tunnel in tough hydrological conditions. However, as the station is in the middle of an industrial zone, due to the economic difficulties of the late 1990s that hit Russia, most of these recently privatised industries were very short of finances and their production output was likewise stalled. This was enough to prevent additional heating of the frozen earth and finally on 11 December 1999 the Moscow's mayor Yury Luzhkov opened the station. The station in its design is identical to its neighbour Krestyanskaya Zastava where both are wall-columned with no underplatform service spaces.

With no solid theme, the station (work of architects Ye.Barsky, V.Fillipov and S.Belyakova) is decorated with bright monochromatic marble on the columns and walls. The floor is covered in red and black granite. The station is decorated by a bright mosaic in the end of the central hall (artist Zurab Tsereteli). The vestibule of the station is interlinked with a subway network under the Sharikopodshipnikovskaya street, with modern glazed metal and concrete pavilions. The average passenger traffic is 14,400 people per day. Behind the station there is a piston junction used for emergency reversals of trains.

== Gallery ==
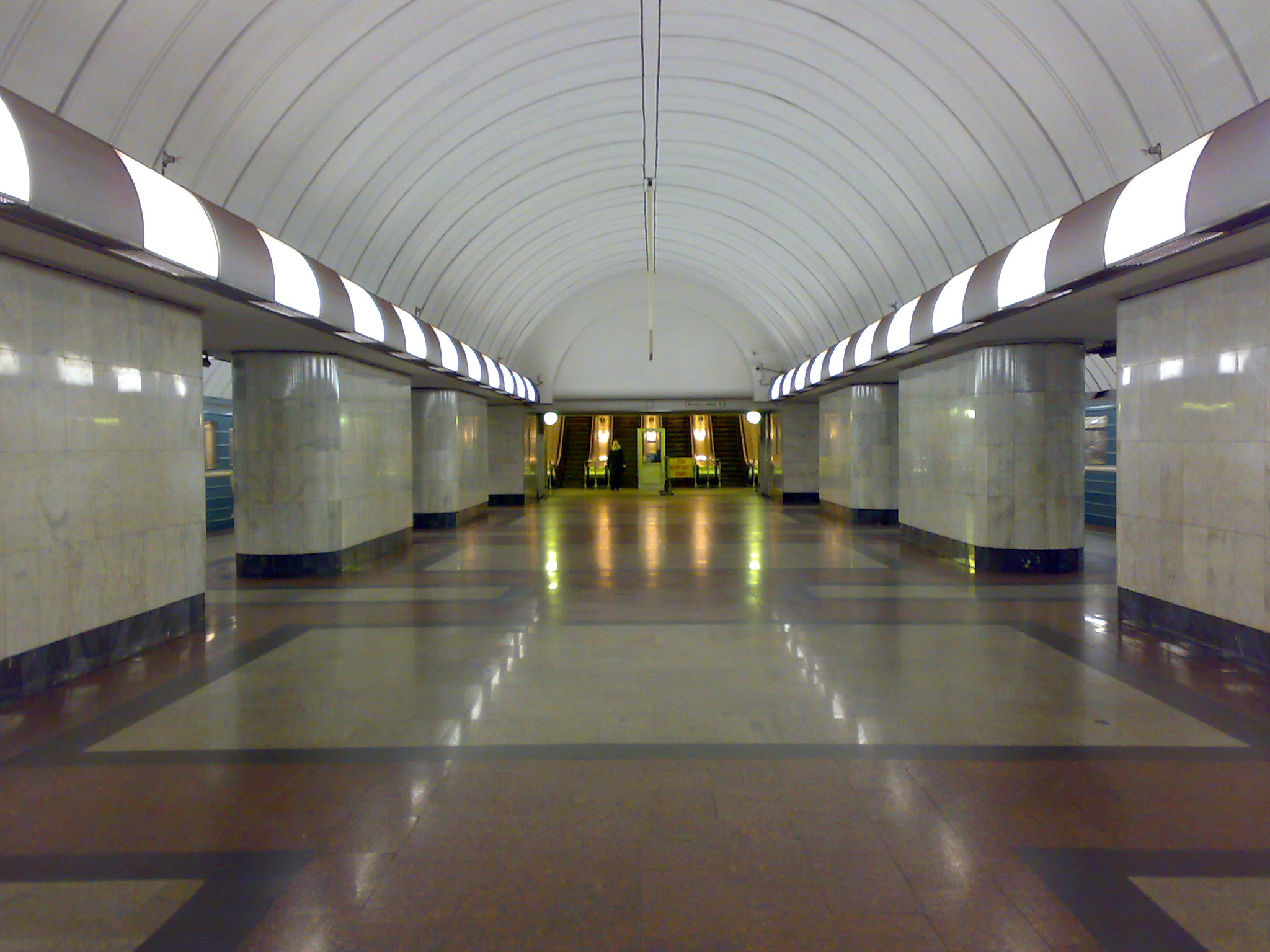

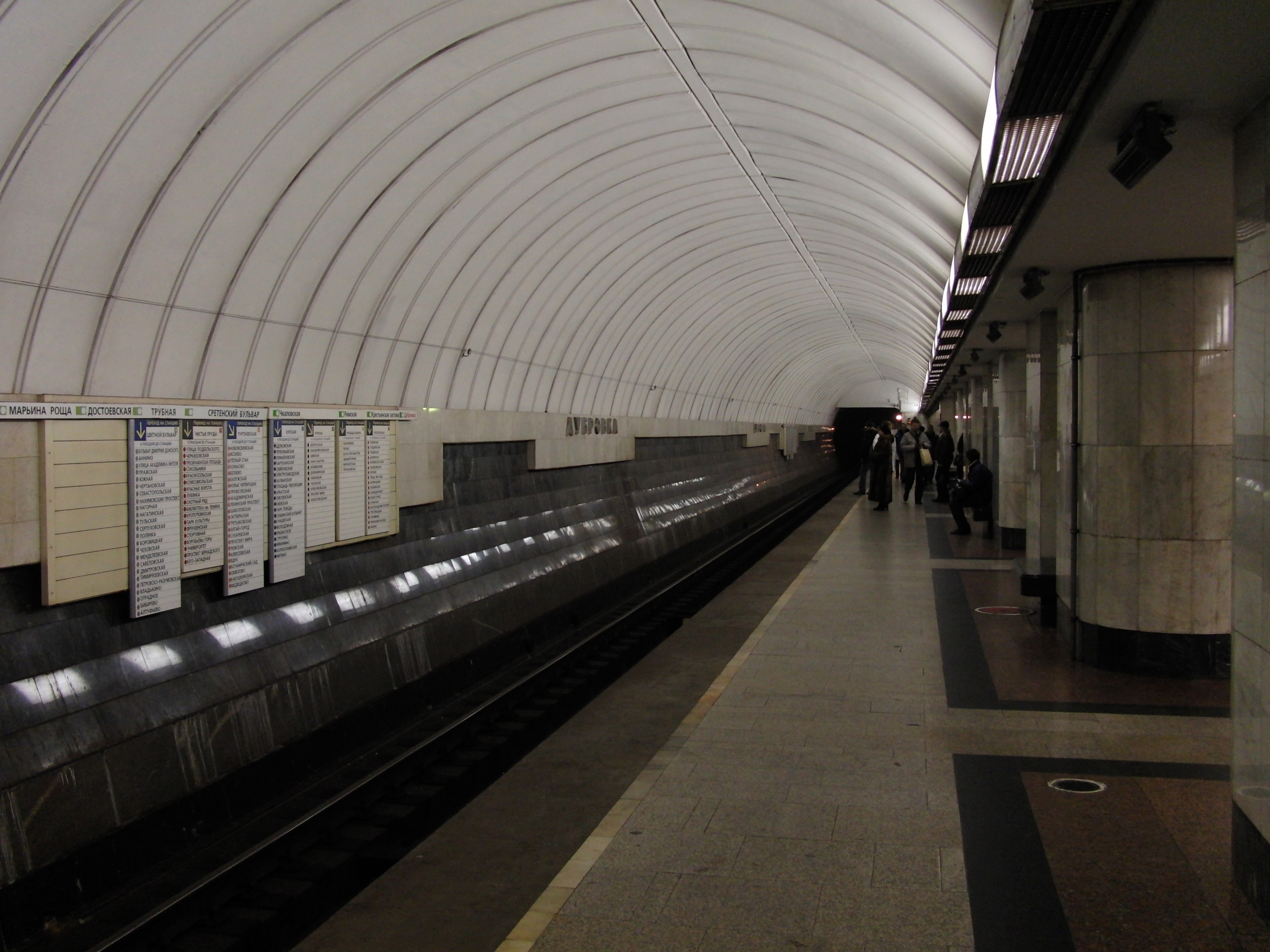

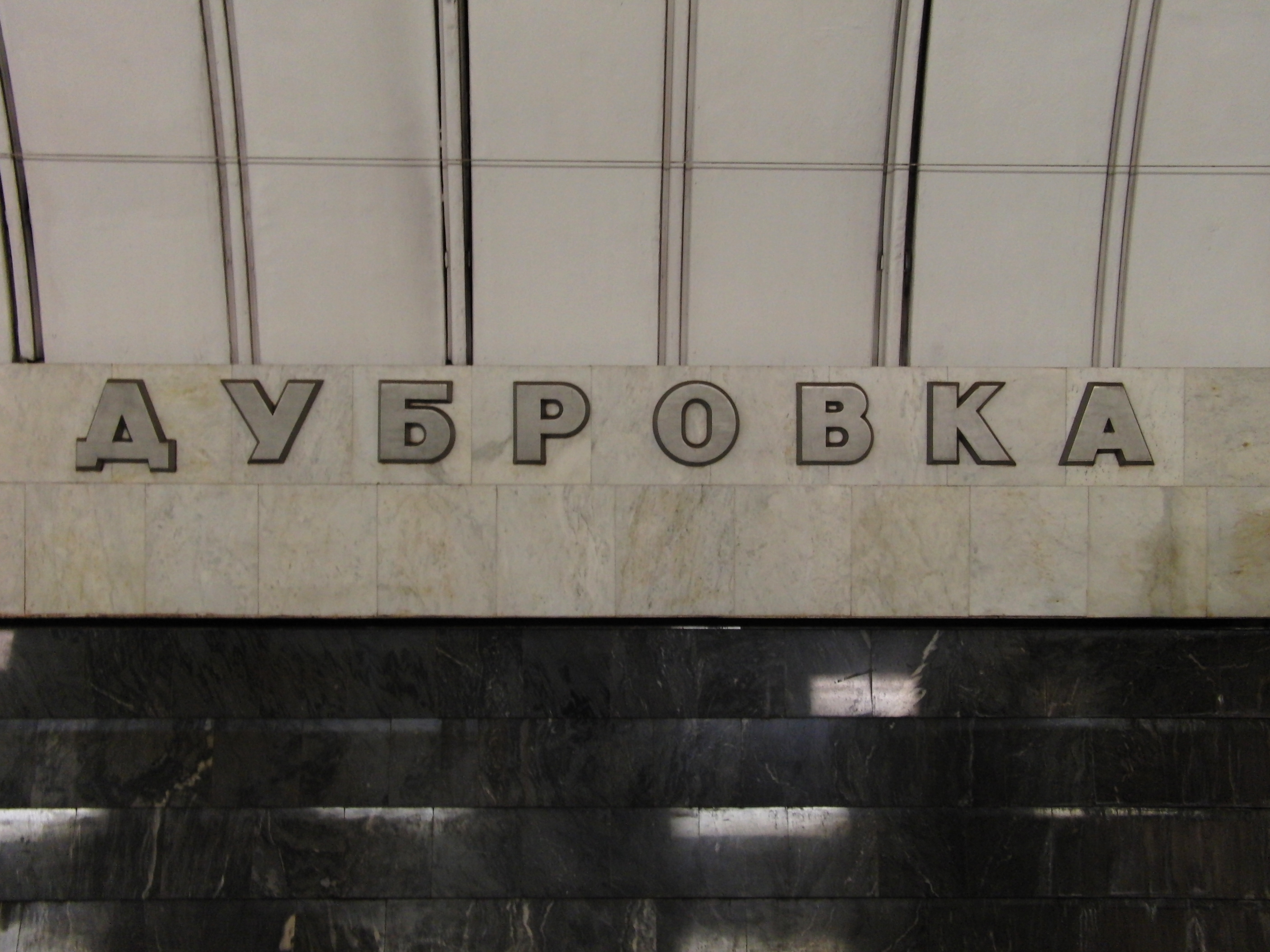
