= Bratislavskaya (Moscow Metro) =

Moscow Metro station

Bratislavskaya Братиславская
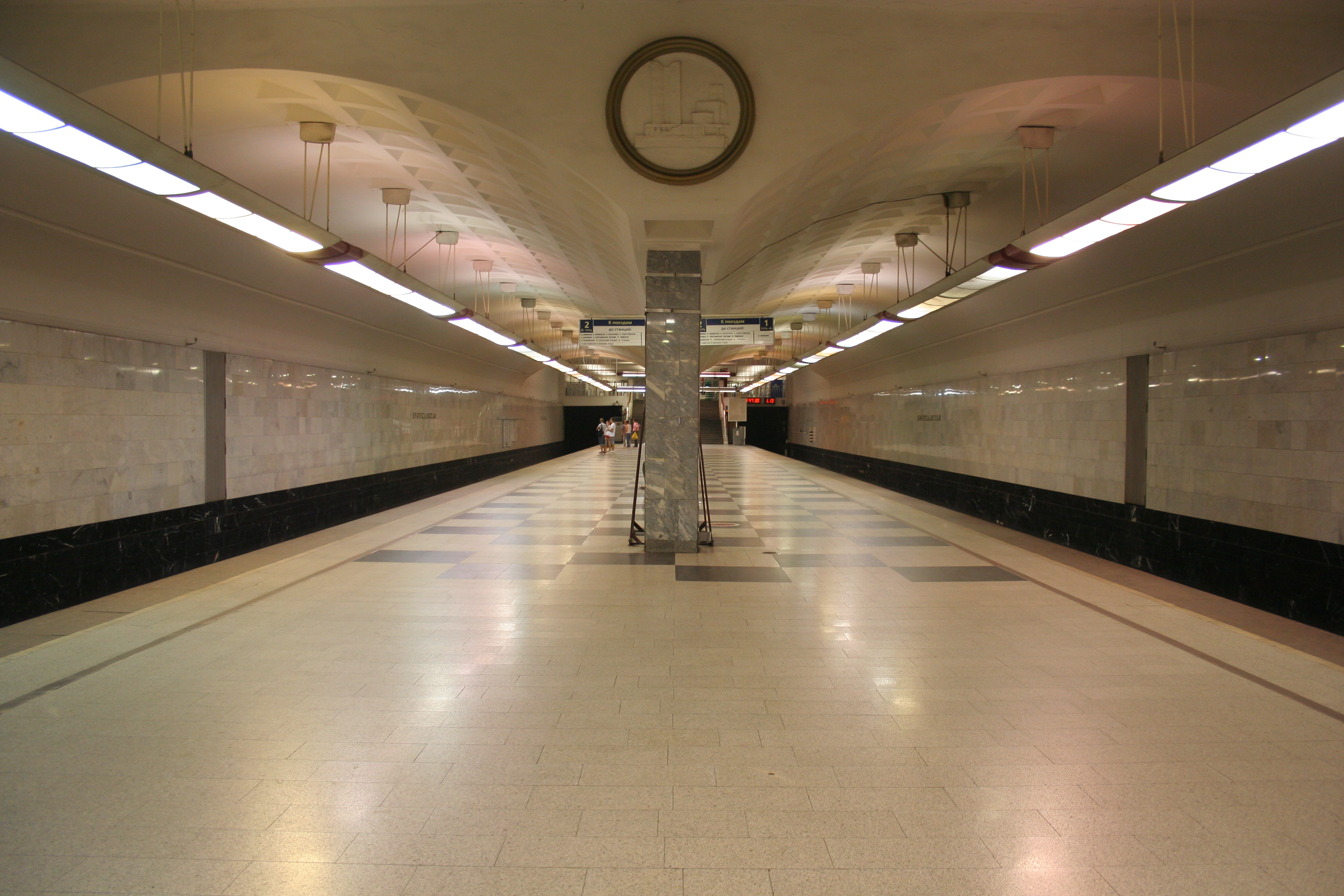

General information
- Location: Maryino District, South-Eastern Administrative Okrug; Moscow; Russia
- Coordinates: 55.6597°N 37.7505°E
- System: Moscow Metro station
- Owner: Moskovsky Metropoliten
- Line: Lyublinsko-Dmitrovskaya line
- Platforms: 1 island platform
- Tracks: 2
- Connections: Bus: 749, 625, 81

Construction
- Structure type: Shallow pillar bi-span
- Depth: 8 metres (26 ft)
- Platform levels: 1
- Parking: No

Other information
- Station code: 158

History
- Opened: 25 December 1996; 29 years ago

Services
Preceding station	Moscow Metro	Following station
Lyublino towards Fiztekh	Lyublinsko-Dmitrovskaya line	Maryino towards Zyablikovo
Route map
Location
- Location within Moscow Metro

Bratislavskaya (Russian: Братиславская) is a Moscow Metro station in the Maryino District, South-Eastern Administrative Okrug, Moscow. It is on the Lyublinsko-Dmitrovskaya Line, between Lyublino and Maryino stations. Bratislavskaya opened on 25 December 1996 as a part of the South-Eastern extension of the Lyublinsky radius.

Named after the Slovak capital Bratislava in honour of the Russo-Slovak friendship, the station is a pillar bi-span. The station's main theme is designed accordingly (architects A.Orlov and A.Nekrasov). The station's length is interrupted with a central square vacuum space that was to serve as a future transfer for the large ring beginning from the Kakhovskaya Line. However the large ring programme has been redesigned and as a result the future transfer will take place at Pechatniki. It is expected that this vaulted space will be covered up as the rest of the station is.

The current architectural decoration is that the two spans are vaulted with suspended lighting hanging from the apexes of the vault. The middle pillar row drops from the joining point of the vaults. The pillars are faced with wavy turquoise marble as are the walls. The floor is out of checkered black and grey granite, except in the future transfer point where the floor is wholly grey. Also decorating the station are four medallions located in the four points above the pillar rows with views of Moscow and Bratislava (Bratislava Castle, Devín Castle, the residence of the Mayor of Moscow, and the Cathedral of Christ the Saviour.

The station has two underground vestibules located under the Pererva street and Myachkovsky boulevard.

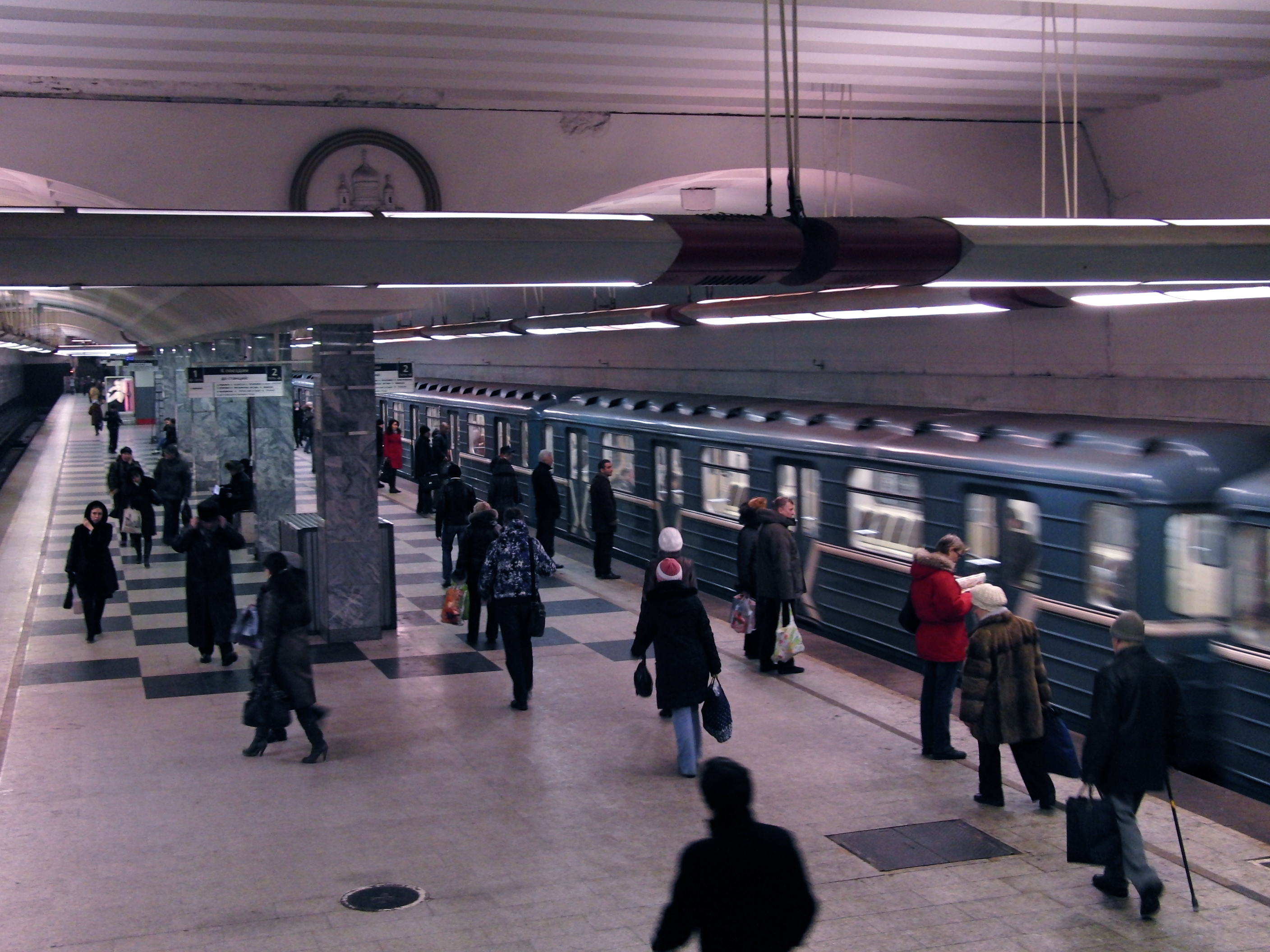
Subway train at Bratislavskaya station

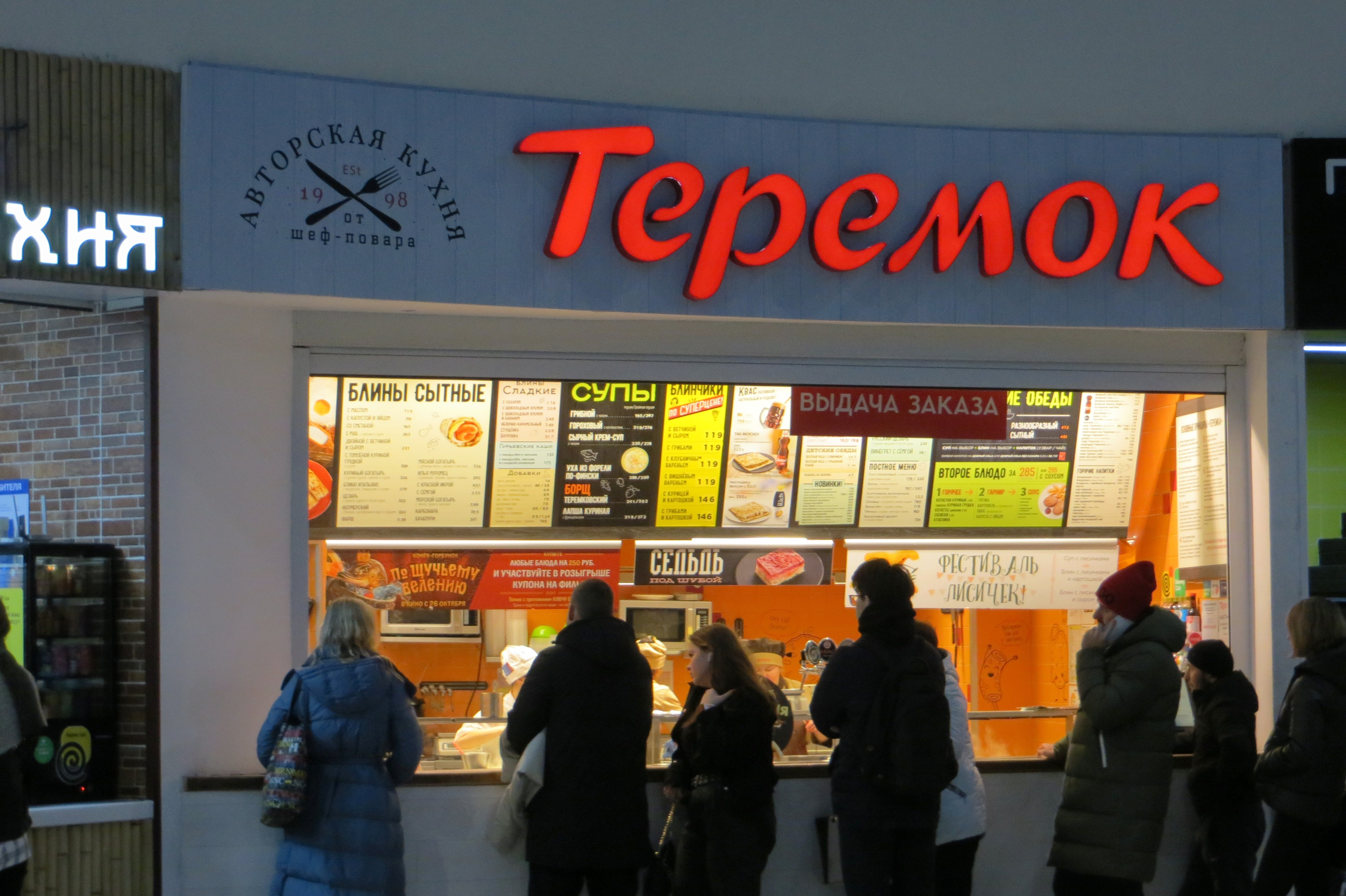
Food court at shopping mall near Bratislavskaya

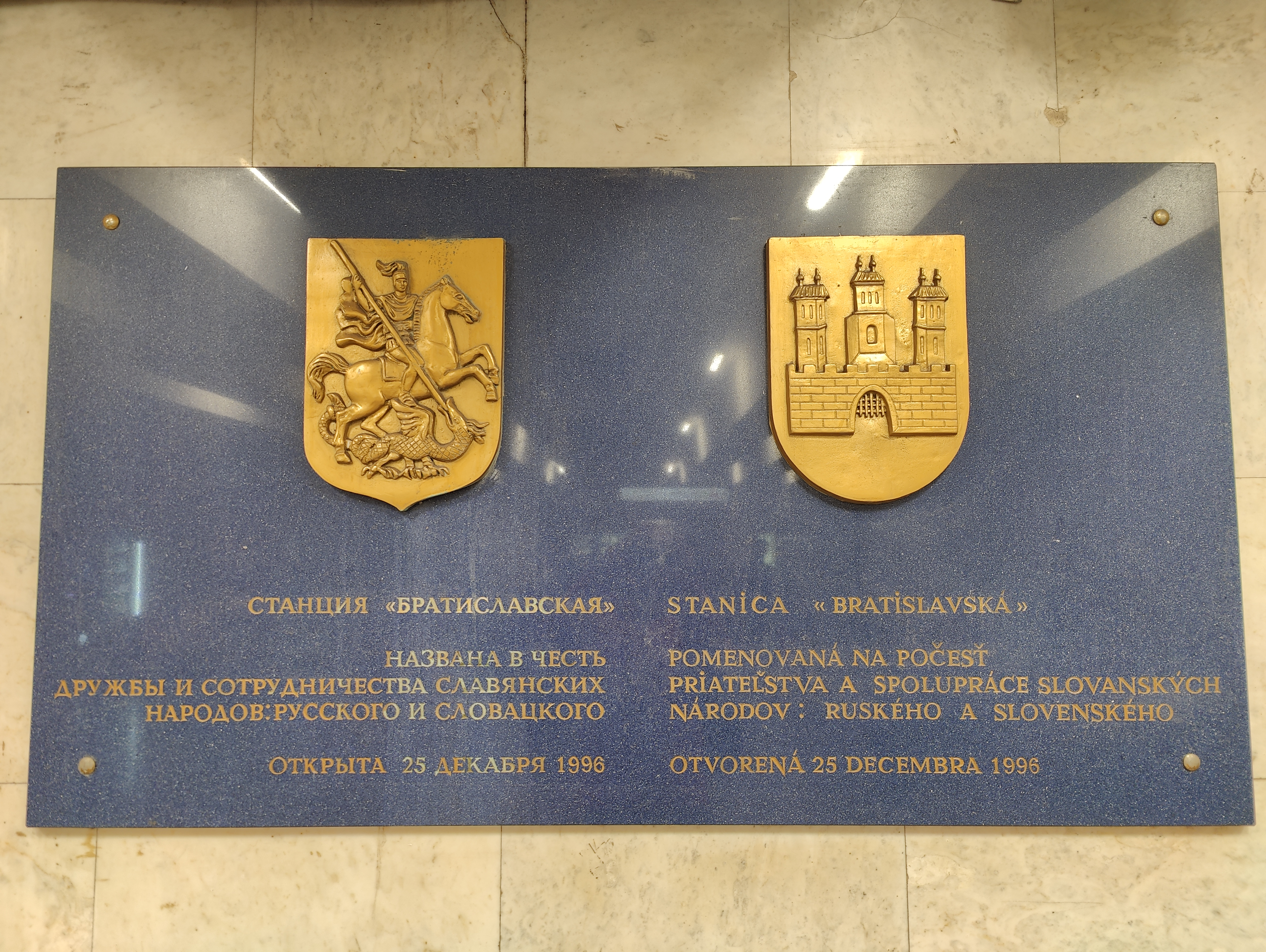
Memorial plate dedicated to Slovak-Russian friendship at Bratislavskaya station

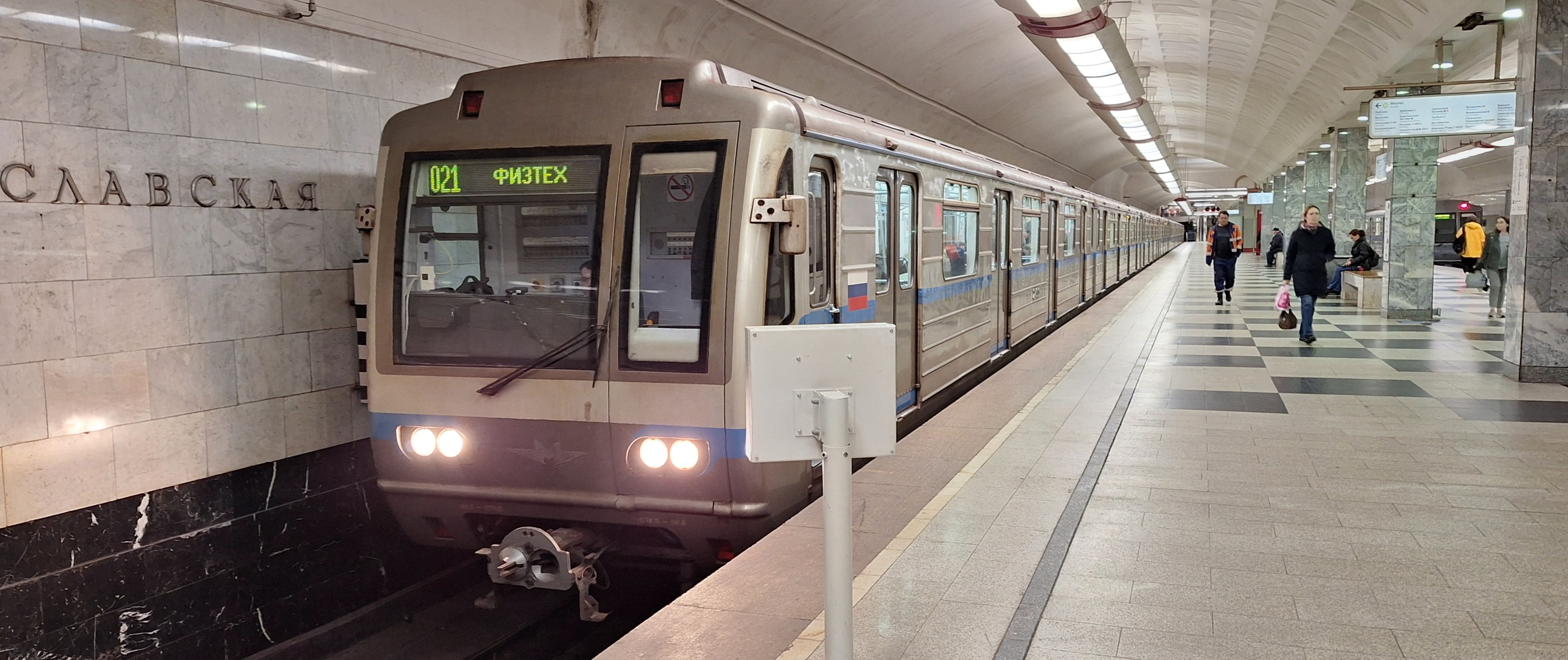
81-717.6
