= Yuzhny Port =

Prospective Moscow Metro station

Yuzhny Port Южный порт

General information
- Location: Pechatniki District, YuVAO; Moscow; Russia
- Coordinates: 55.7°N 37.707°E
- System: Moscow Metro station
- Owner: Moskovsky Metropoliten
- Line: Lyublinsko-Dmitrovskaya line

Construction
- Depth: 15 metres (49 ft)

Services
Preceding station	Moscow Metro	Following station
Kozhukhovskaya towards Fiztekh	Lyublinsko-Dmitrovskaya line	Pechatniki towards Zyablikovo
Route map
Location
- Location within Moscow Metro

Yuzhny Port (Russian: Южный порт, Southern Port) is a Moscow metro station under construction on the Lyublinsko-Dmitrovskaya line (line 10). It will be located in the Yuzhny Port industrial zone in Pechatniki District. It has started building in 2026. The opening is scheduled for 2030 on the existing section between Kozhukhovskaya and Pechatniki stations.

== History ==
In November 2017 it became known that a new Yuzhny Port station could be built, which will be located in the industrial zone between Kozhukhovskaya and Pechatniki stations of the Line 10. The decision to build the station will be made depending on the financing of this project by private investors.

In October 2020 the location of the station was determined: along the Projected Drive No. 1423 at the intersection with Yuzhnoportovaya Street. The station will serve the future residential areas on the territory of the industrial zone. It is assumed that during the construction of the Yuzhny Port, the traffic of trains between the stations Kozhukhovskaya and Volzhskaya will be closed for about a year. Passenger traffic will be covered by two compensation bus routes. On 21 November 2020, the Vice Mayor of Moscow for urban development policy and construction Andrei Bochkaryov announced that construction would begin in 2022.
