= Kozhukhovskaya =

Moscow Metro station

Kozhukhovskaya Кожуховская
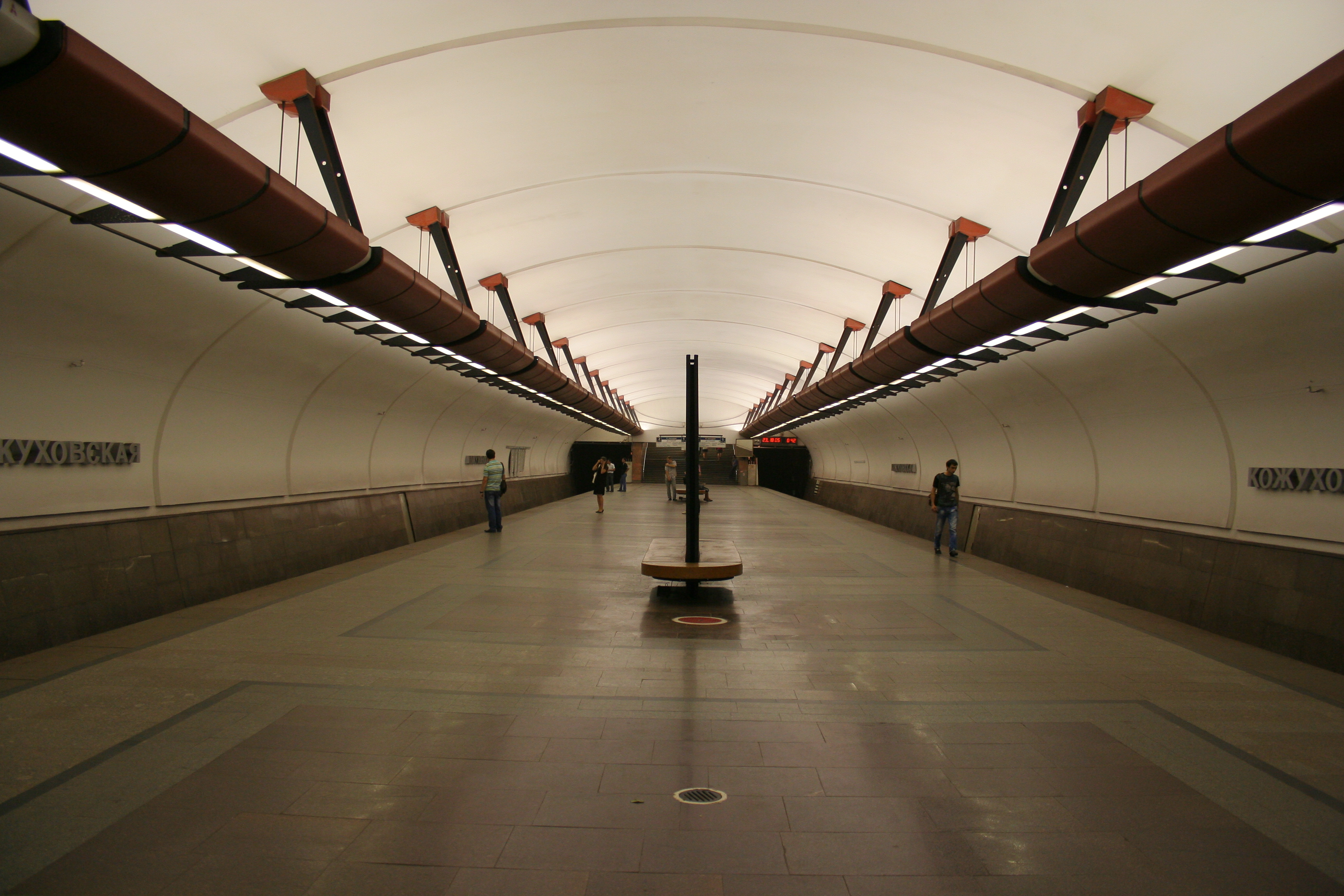

General information
- Location: Yuzhnoportovy District; South-Eastern Administrative Okrug; Moscow; Russia
- Coordinates: 55.7074°N 37.6851°E
- System: Moscow Metro station
- Owner: Moskovsky Metropoliten
- Line: Lyublinsko-Dmitrovskaya line
- Platforms: 1 island platform
- Tracks: 2
- Connections: Bus: 8, 9, 44, 142, 159, 193, 670, 736

Construction
- Depth: 12 metres (39 ft)
- Platform levels: 1
- Parking: No

Other information
- Station code: 154

History
- Opened: 28 December 1995; 30 years ago

Services
Preceding station	Moscow Metro	Following station
Dubrovka towards Fiztekh	Lyublinsko-Dmitrovskaya line	Pechatniki towards Zyablikovo
Out-of-station interchange
Ugreshskaya anticlockwise / outer	Moscow Central Circle transfer at Dubrovka	Avtozavodskaya clockwise / inner
Route map
Location
- Location within Moscow Metro

Kozhukhovskaya (Russian: Кожуховская) is a station on Moscow Metro's Lyublinsko-Dmitrovskaya line. Named after the district it is located in, the station was opened on December 28, 1995 as part of the first stage of the Lyublinsky radius. The station is a single vaulted design with a back vault to accommodate for the additional hydroisolation required.

The theme of the decoration is history of automobile design which shows the perfection of the station walls made of white marble turning into a large aluminum ceiling. Darker, brown marble is used for lower regions of the back vault and lighting comes from very large and contrasting red metallic structures hanging from the main vault. Grey granite also contributes to the station's very bright appearance. The architects are A.Vigdorov and L.Borzenkov.

The station has one vestibule with a glazed pavilion on the corner of Yuzhnoportovaya and Trofimova streets.

There are future plans to construct a transfer station with the same name to the Nekrasovskaya and Troitskaya lines when they fusion together. And Yuzhny Port is expected to be built south of the station in 2030.
