= Dubrovka (Moscow Central Circle) =

Station on the Moscow Central Circle

Dubrovka Дубровка
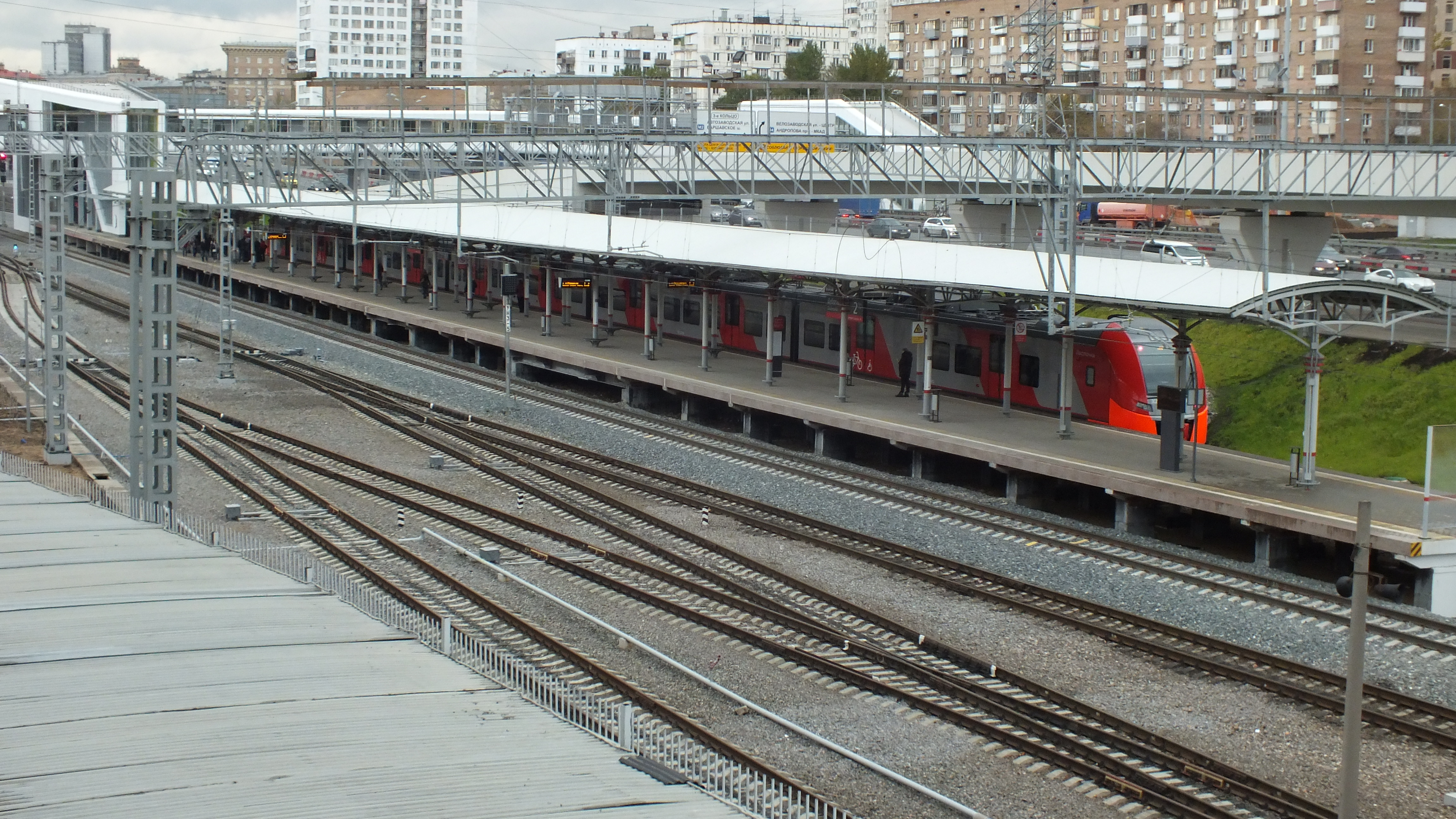

General information
- Coordinates: 55.7127°N 37.6781°E
- System: Moscow Metro
- Line: Moscow Central Circle
- Platforms: 2 side platforms
- Tracks: 2

History
- Opened: 11 October 2016; 9 years ago

Services
Preceding station	Moscow Metro	Following station
Ugreshskaya anticlockwise / outer	Moscow Central Circle	Avtozavodskaya clockwise / inner
Out-of-station interchange
Krestyanskaya Zastava towards Fiztekh	Lyublinsko-Dmitrovskaya line transfer at Dubrovka	Kozhukhovskaya towards Zyablikovo
Dubrovka towards Fiztekh	Lyublinsko-Dmitrovskaya line transfer at Kozhukhovskaya	Pechatniki towards Zyablikovo
Route map
Location
- Location within Moscow Metro

Dubrovka (Russian: Дубровка) is a station on the Moscow Central Circle of the Moscow Metro.

Passengers may make free out-of-station transfers to Dubrovka on the Lyublinsko-Dmitrovskaya Line. Free transfers are also permitted to Kozhukhovskaya on that line. The distance to Kozhukhovskaya is more than a kilometer, however.

One of the station's exits is connected to a mall directly.

== Gallery ==
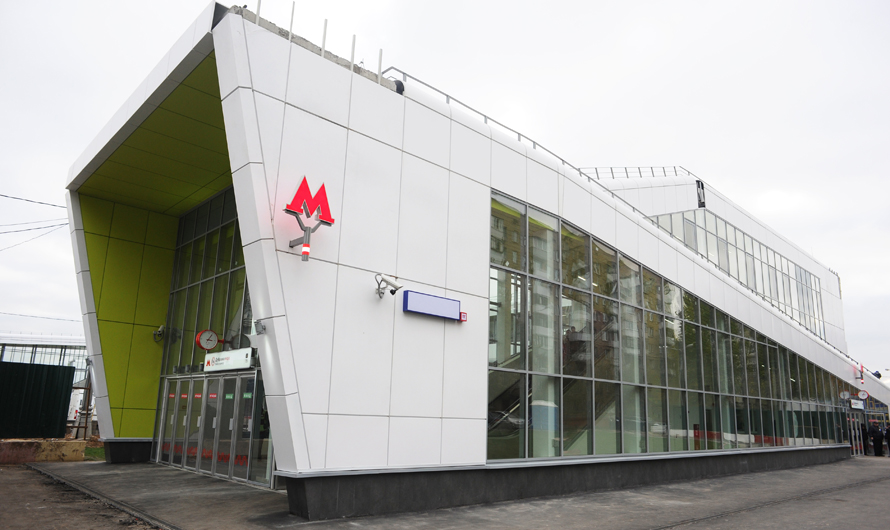

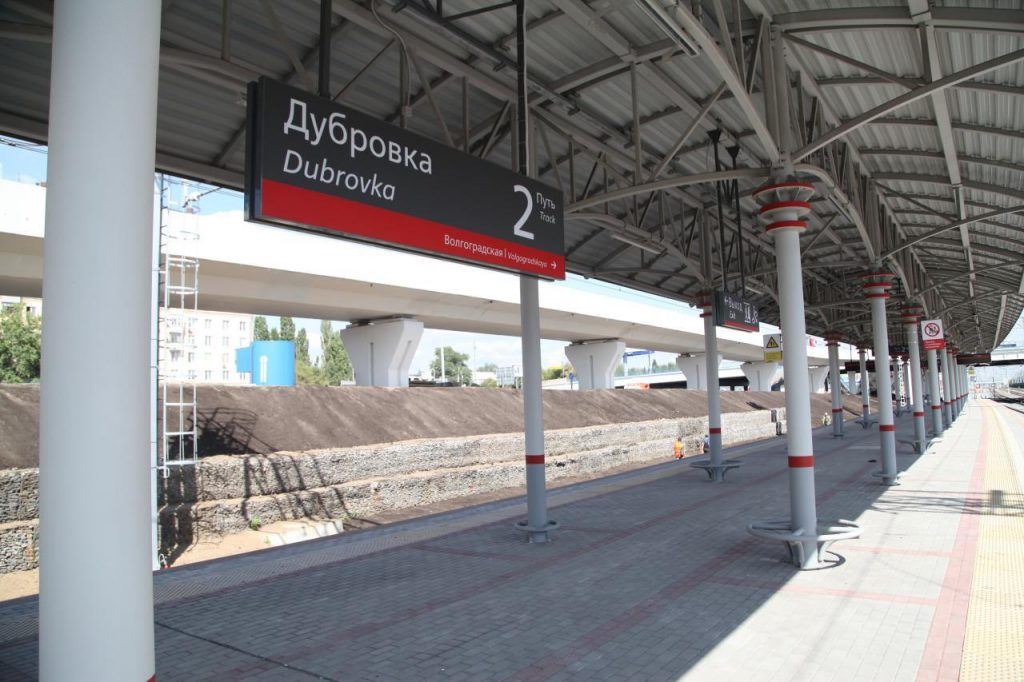

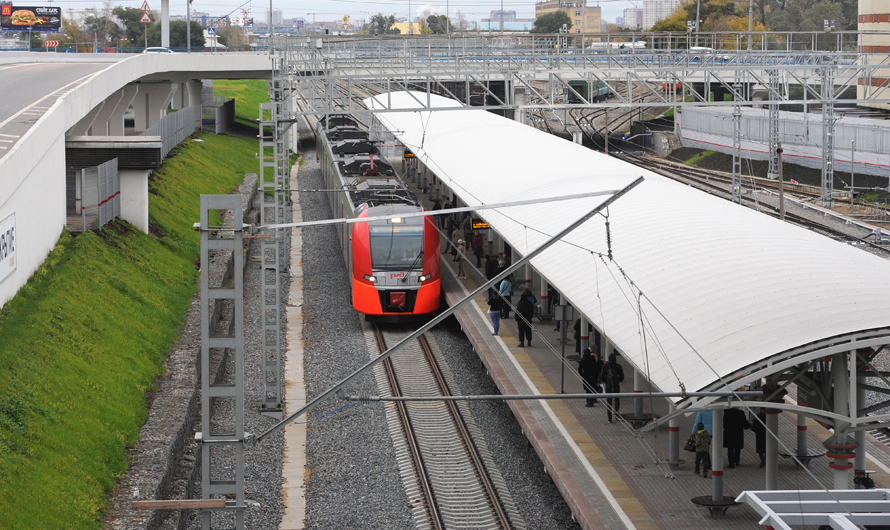

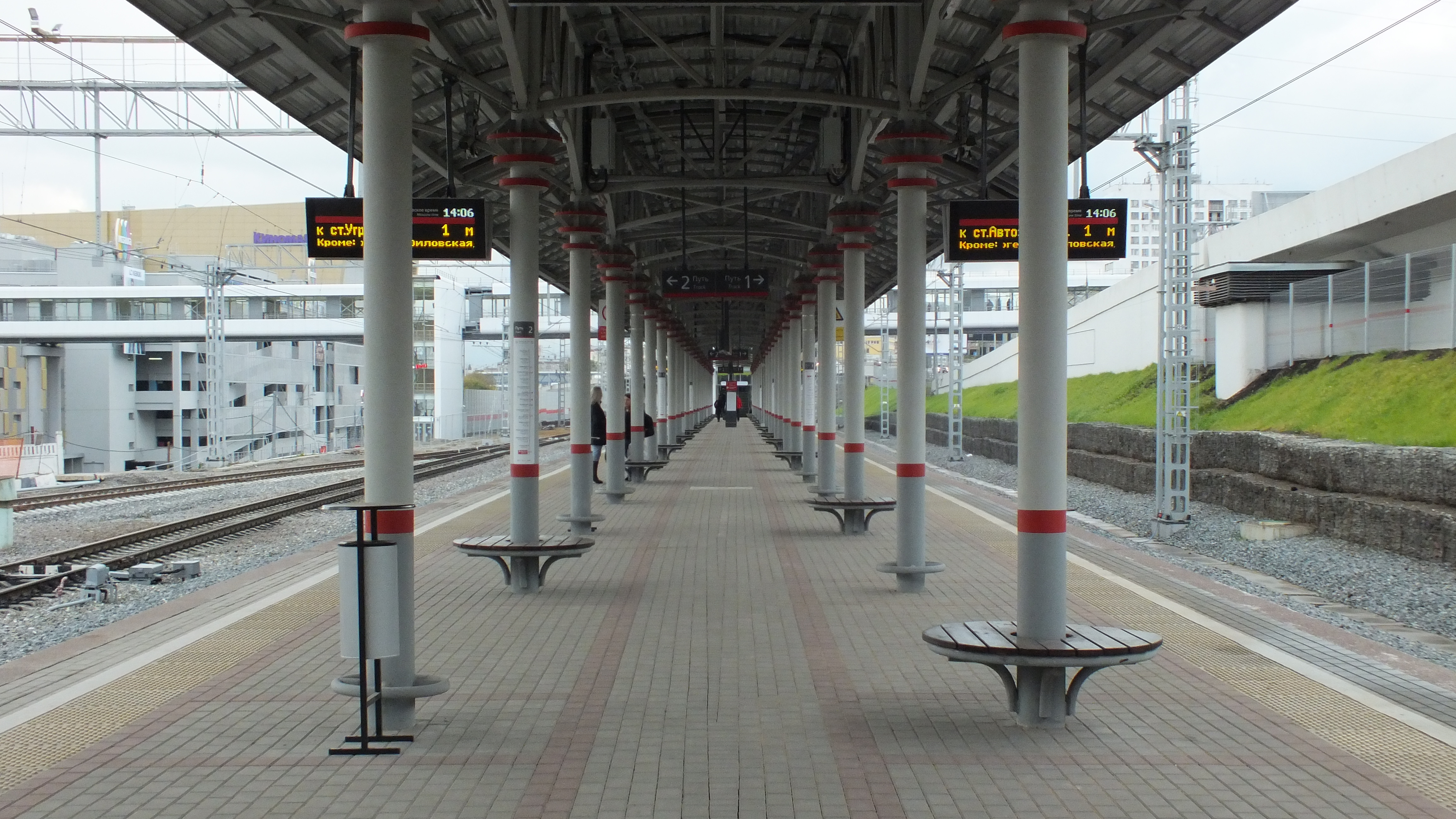

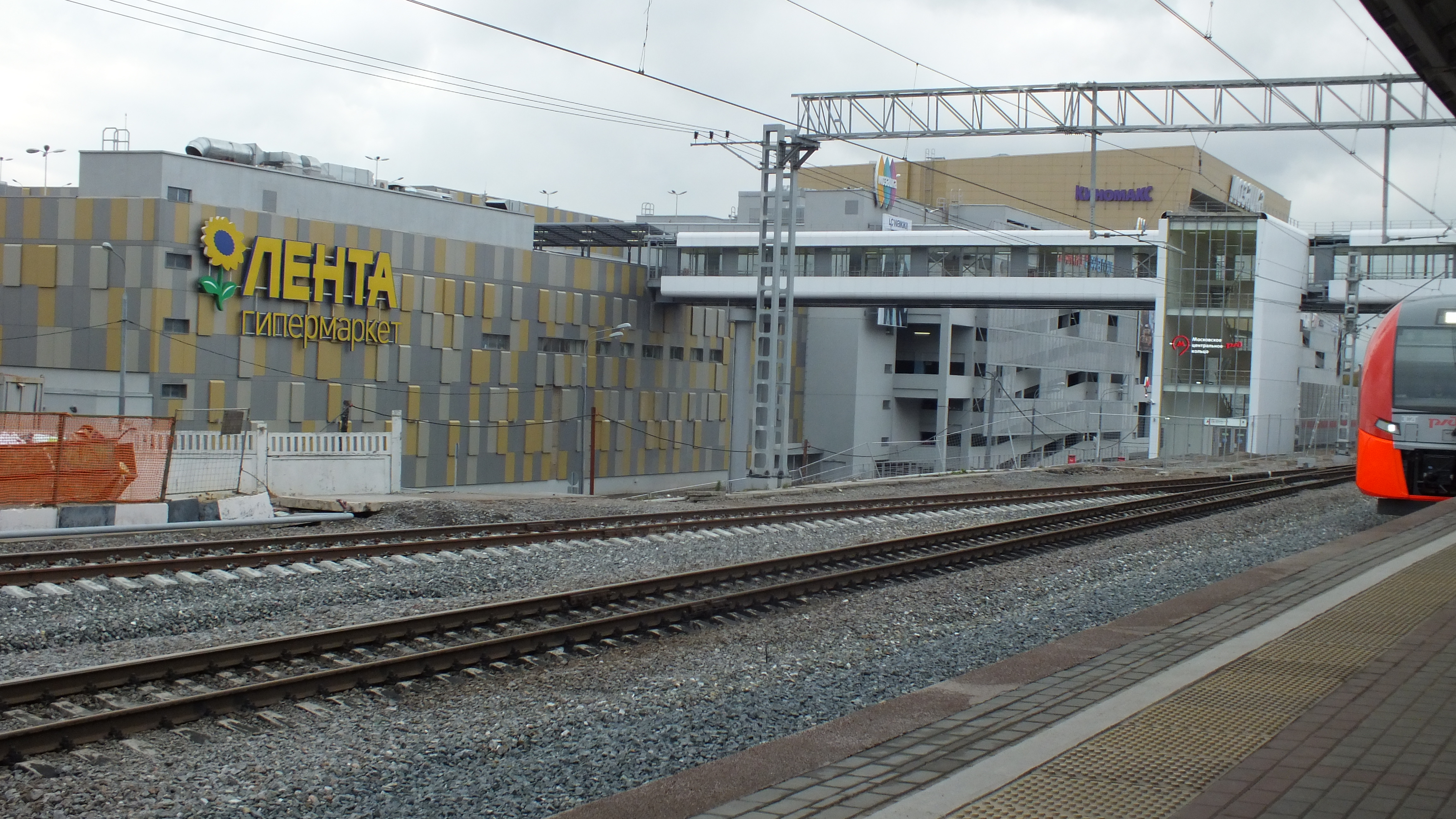
