= Maryino (Moscow Metro) =

Moscow Metro station

Maryino Марьино

General information
- Location: Maryino District, South-Eastern Administrative Okrug; Moscow; Russia
- Coordinates: 55.6500°N 37.7431°E
- System: Moscow Metro station
- Owner: Moskovsky Metropoliten
- Line: Lyublinsko-Dmitrovskaya line
- Platforms: 1 island platform
- Tracks: 2
- Connections: Bus: 749, 625, 81, 115

Construction
- Structure type: shallow single-span
- Depth: 8 metres (26 ft)
- Platform levels: 1
- Parking: No

Other information
- Station code: 159

History
- Opened: 25 December 1996; 29 years ago

Services
Preceding station	Moscow Metro	Following station
Bratislavskaya towards Fiztekh	Lyublinsko-Dmitrovskaya line	Borisovo towards Zyablikovo
Route map
Location
- Location within Moscow Metro

Maryino (Russian: Марьино) is a Moscow Metro station in the Maryino District, South-Eastern Administrative Okrug, Moscow. It is on the Lyublinsko-Dmitrovskaya Line, between Bratislavskaya and Borisovo stations.

Maryino opened on 25 December 1996 as the terminus of the second stage of the extension of the Lyublinsky radius to the southeast. It is located in Maryino District, the most populated district of Moscow. The station's depth is 8 metres. Like Volzhskaya, the station is single deck except with a much lower ceiling and a monolithic concrete being used to cover it. The architects are V.Filippov, S.Belyakova. The ceiling of the station is broken into a series of large niches where two six-lamp chandeliers are suspended. Metallic hemispherical tiles cover the top part of the walls, black marble for lower parts. Grey and black granite form the floor.

The station has two vestibules under the Lyublinskaya street's intersection with Maryinsky and Novocherkassky boulevards. Behind the station is a set of reversal sidings and a cross junction.

On December 2, 2011 the stretch of the Lyublinsko-Dmitrovskaya Line with three stations to Zyablikovo opened, and Maryino ceased to be the terminal station.
