= Borisovo (Moscow Metro) =

Moscow Metro station

Borisovo Борисово
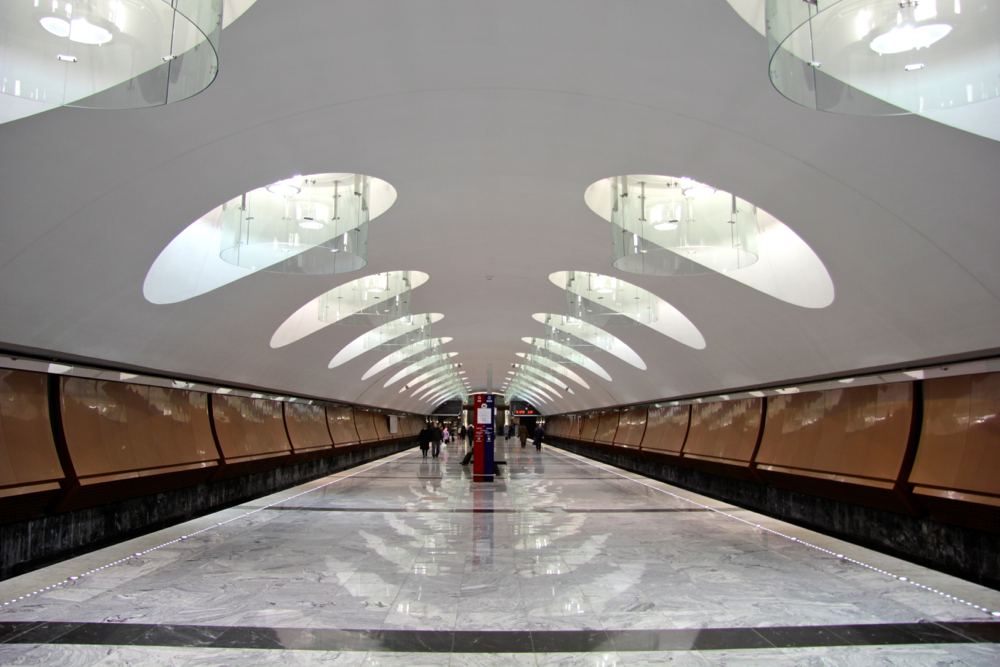
- Station on the opening day

General information
- Location: Brateyevo District, Southern Administrative Okrug; Moscow; Russia
- Coordinates: 55.6334°N 37.7436°E
- System: Moscow Metro station
- Owner: Moskovsky Metropoliten
- Line: Lyublinsko-Dmitrovskaya line
- Platforms: 1 island platform
- Tracks: 2
- Connections: Bus: 280, 740, 764

Construction
- Structure type: Shallow single-vault
- Depth: 9 metres (30 ft)
- Platform levels: 1
- Parking: No
- Accessible: Yes

History
- Opened: 2 December 2011; 14 years ago

Services
Preceding station	Moscow Metro	Following station
Maryino towards Fiztekh	Lyublinsko-Dmitrovskaya line	Shipilovskaya towards Zyablikovo
Route map
Location
- Location within Moscow Metro

Borisovo (Russian: Бори́сово) is a Moscow Metro station in the Brateyevo District, Southern Administrative Okrug in Moscow. It is on the Lyublinsko-Dmitrovskaya Line, between Maryino and Shipilovskaya stations. Borisovo was opened on December 2, 2011 along with the stations Maryino and Zyablikovo.

== Name ==
At the beginning, until 1989, the station had its project name set as Brateyevo. In 1996, the Government of Moscow enacted a new name Borisovo after a former village located in the West and South-West, not far from the constructed metro station. The resolution set the name Brateyevo to a projected station initially called Promzona, however during the construction, Promzona was renamed as Alma-Atinskaya.

According to RIA Novosti, since January 1, 2011, the city authorities were supposed to rename the station Borisovo as Kazakhnskaya. In return, the Almaty Metro in Kazakhstan should have had a station Moskovskaya. Nevertheless, Borisovo's name remained unchanged.

== The History of Construction ==
The decision about building the station (initially Brateyevo) was made in the 1980s. In the feasibility study in 1988, the station was allocated under the stream bed of Gorodnya River which was supposed to be included into sewer system. The first works took place since 1993 until 1996. During this time, the Canadian tunnelling shield Polina extended the main tunnel line towards Maryino in 190m. In September 1998, the works stopped due to the lack of funds. In March 2004, the illegally preserved tunnelling shield was dismantled, raised to the surface, cleaned of the rust and used for building the Kazan Metro.

In 2008, the works started basically from the top in accordance with a modified project. The location of the station was moved 40m to the north, towards Maryino, since the floodplain around the Gorodnya River, from Brateyevskaya Street to the Moskva River, is a protected natural monument. On October 17, 2008, the tunnel boring machine Svetlana started excavating the first and the main line of the tunnel from Maryino towards to the future Borisovo. Subsequently, on November 9 and 10, 2009, the tunnel boring machines Vera and Svetlana were finishing the tunnelling.

The station is built with monolithic reinforced concrete. The walls were made in formworks. The vault covering with the light niches was built in a special horizontally movable formwork with galvanised steel frames. The vault, 162 metres long, was divided into 18 parts (9 metres each) during the concreting.

On January 4, 2011, the government of Moscow announced its plans about completing the stations Borisovo, Shipilovskaya and Zayablikovo until the 4th quarter of 2011. The station was opened the 2nd of December 2011 as a part of Marino-Zayablikovo section and became the 185th station of Moscow Metro.

== Technical Parameters ==
The platform is shallow single-vault built with monolithic reinforced concrete. The depth is 9 metres and the height is more than 6 metres. The platform is one-centred, 162m long and 10m wide. The monolithic vault is constructed with underground shafts used for service communication between the vestibules, and lamp maintenance. The lamps are fixed on the vault with a special rail which is used for maintenance ( lamp replacement etc.) This system was used in Moscow metro for the first time.

Vestibules There are two underground vestibules. The northern one goes to the street Borisovsky Ponds, and the southern one to the passage Brateyevsky Proyezd. The ticket halls are located in the underpass. Each lobby is equipped with a group of three escalators E25T with the lifting height 12,2m.

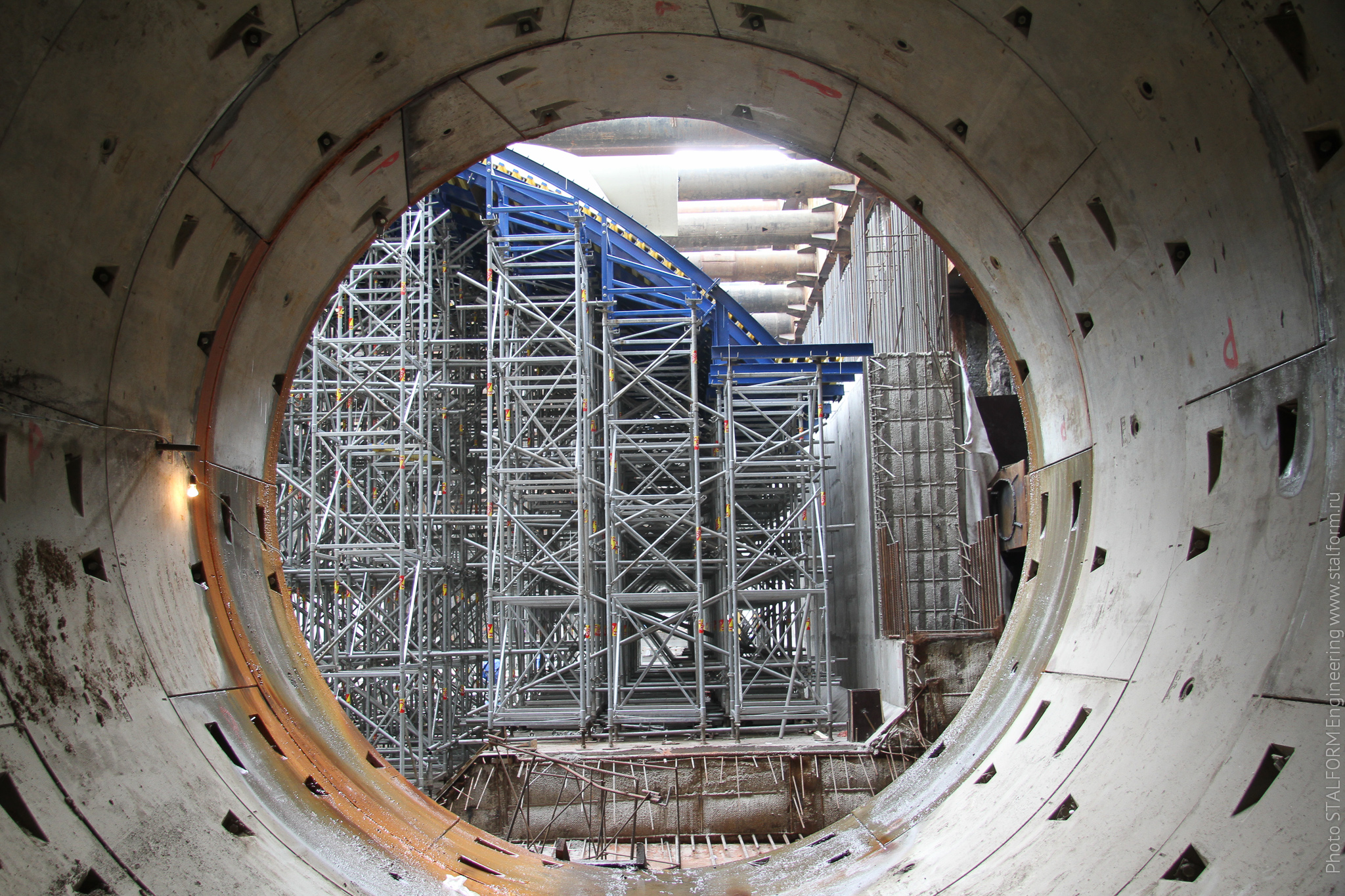
The subway construction process

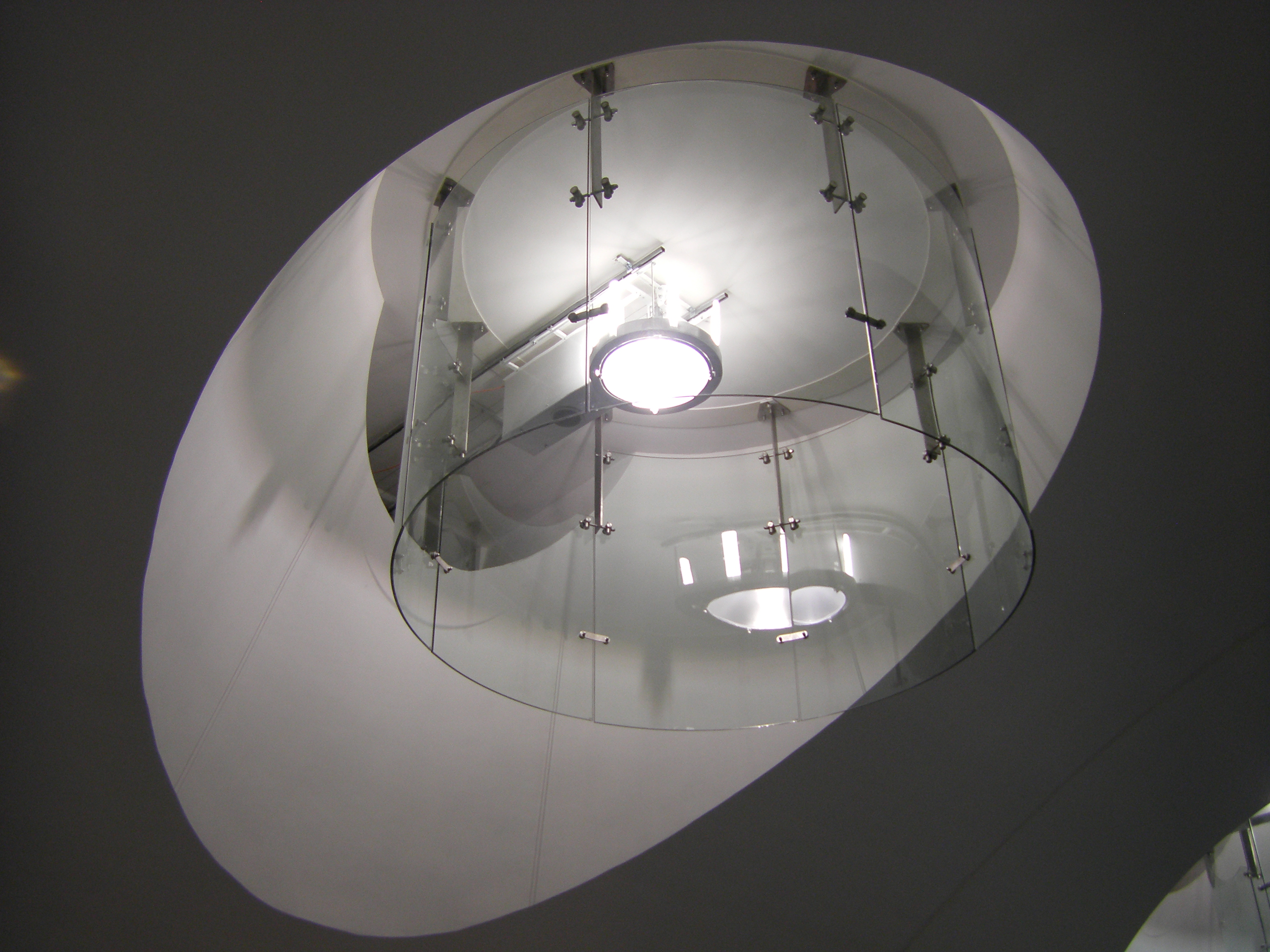
Light niches

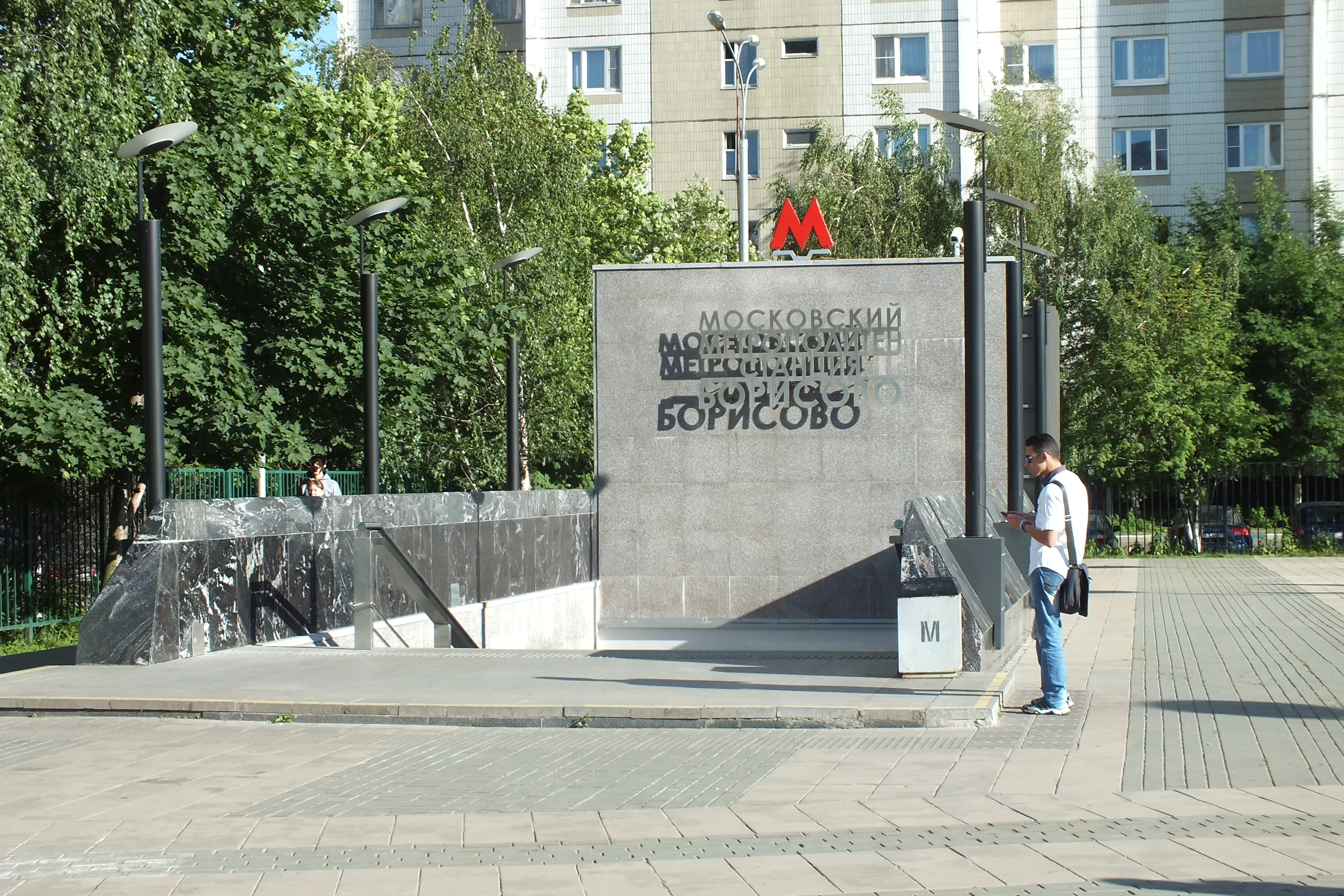
North vestibule of the station

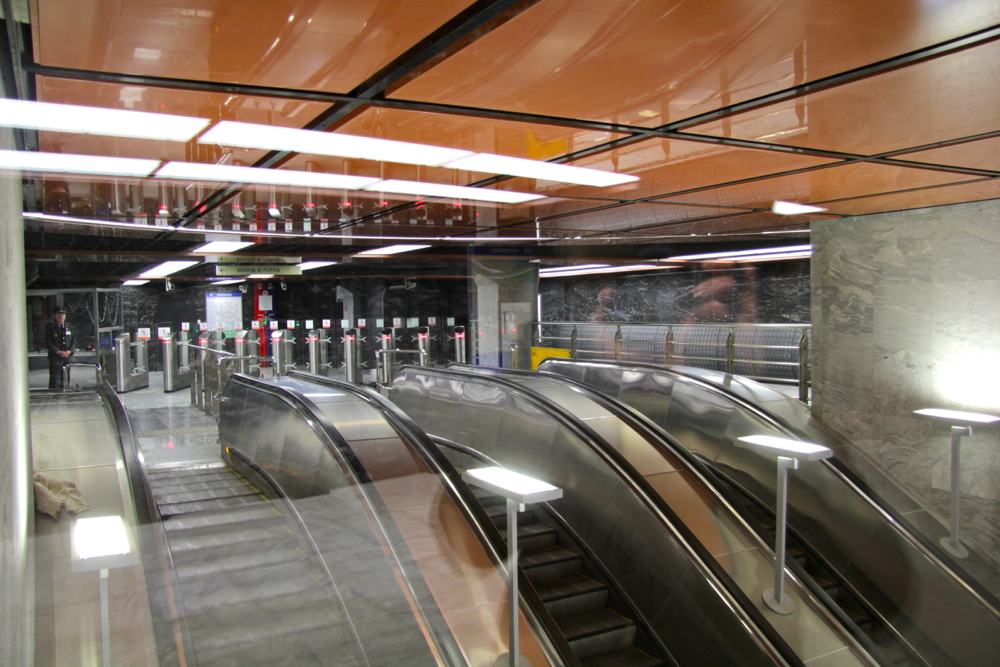
Escalators in the north vestibule

== The Station in Numbers ==
- Code of the station – 160
- The axis of ordinate – PK0203+00
- The station opens at 5.45 a.m. on odd-numbered days and 5.50 a.m. on even-numbered days. It closes at 1 a.m.

The first arrivals of the train:

	Even/Odd-Numbered Days	Toward Zyablikovo	Toward Petrovsko-Razumovskaya
Monday - Friday	Even	5:57:00	5:55:00
Monday - Friday	Odd	5:58:00	5:55:00
Saturday - Sunday	Even	5:57:00	5:55:00
Saturday - Sunday	Odd	5:58:00	5:55:00

Construction in numbers:

- During the construction was used 2,000 tons of steel and 48,000 cubic metres of reinforced concrete.
- There was dug out 129,000 cubic metres of soil
- The pit was 296m long and 22m wide
- 1,300 piles were used for the foundations
