= Lyublino =

Lyublino may refer to:

- Lyublino District in Moscow, Russia
- Lyublino (Moscow Metro), a station of the Moscow Metro, Moscow, Russia
- Lyublino, Kaliningrad Oblast, a settlement in Kaliningrad Oblast, Russia
- Lyublino, name of several other rural localities in Russia
