= Lyublino (Moscow Metro) =

Moscow Metro station

Lyublino Люблино
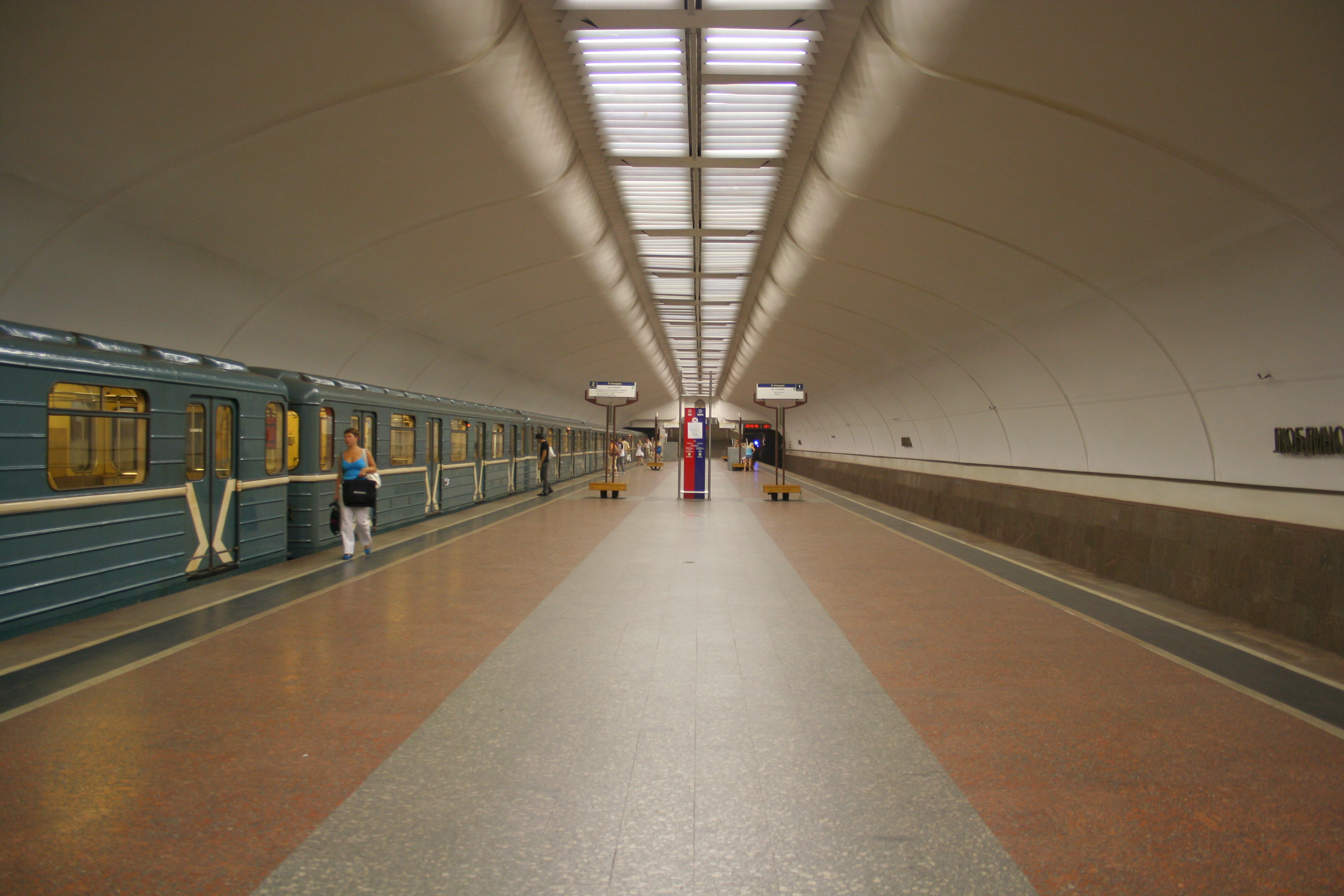

General information
- Location: Lyublino District, South-Eastern Administrative Okrug; Moscow; Russia
- Coordinates: 55.6758°N 37.7618°E
- System: Moscow Metro station
- Owner: Moskovsky Metropoliten
- Line: Lyublinsko-Dmitrovskaya line
- Platforms: 1 island platform
- Tracks: 2
- Connections: Bus: 30, 35, 54, 201, 242, 658, 657, 728, 854, 954

Construction
- Depth: 8 metres (26 ft)
- Platform levels: 1
- Parking: No

Other information
- Station code: 157

History
- Opened: 25 December 1996; 29 years ago

Services
Preceding station	Moscow Metro	Following station
Volzhskaya towards Fiztekh	Lyublinsko-Dmitrovskaya line	Bratislavskaya towards Zyablikovo
Route map
Location
- Location within Moscow Metro

Lyublino (Russian: Люблинó) is a Moscow Metro station in the Lyublino District, South-Eastern Administrative Okrug, Moscow. It is on the Lyublinsko-Dmitrovskaya Line, between Volzhskaya and Bratislavskaya stations.

Lyublino opened on 25 December 1996 as part of the second stage of the southeast extension of the Lyublinsky radius. The station is a level single vault design with the main theme (architects V.Filippov and S.Belyakova) is dedicated to the architecture of the towns that are located in Moscow's outskirts (the district of Lyublino was originally a town before being swallowed by Moscow when the city expanded in 1961).

The station consists of two vaulted halves which stop in the apex of the vault where a niche containing the lighting effects is located, which runs the length of the ceiling. The white vaulted halves gently transform into the station walls which are revetted with dark marble in the lower half. Just above the exit portals are two medallions showing the coat of arms of the Lyublino district.

The station has two underground vestibules under the Krasnodarskaya and Sovkhoznaya streets, the exits are covered with closed metallic pavilions.
