= Brateyevo =

Brateyevo may refer to:

- Brateyevo District, a district of Southern Administrative Okrug, Moscow, Russia
- Brateyevo, name previously proposed for Alma-Atinskaya, a future station of the Moscow Metro
- Brateyevo, a motive power depot under construction
