= Shipilovskaya =

Moscow Metro station

Shipilovskaya Шипиловская
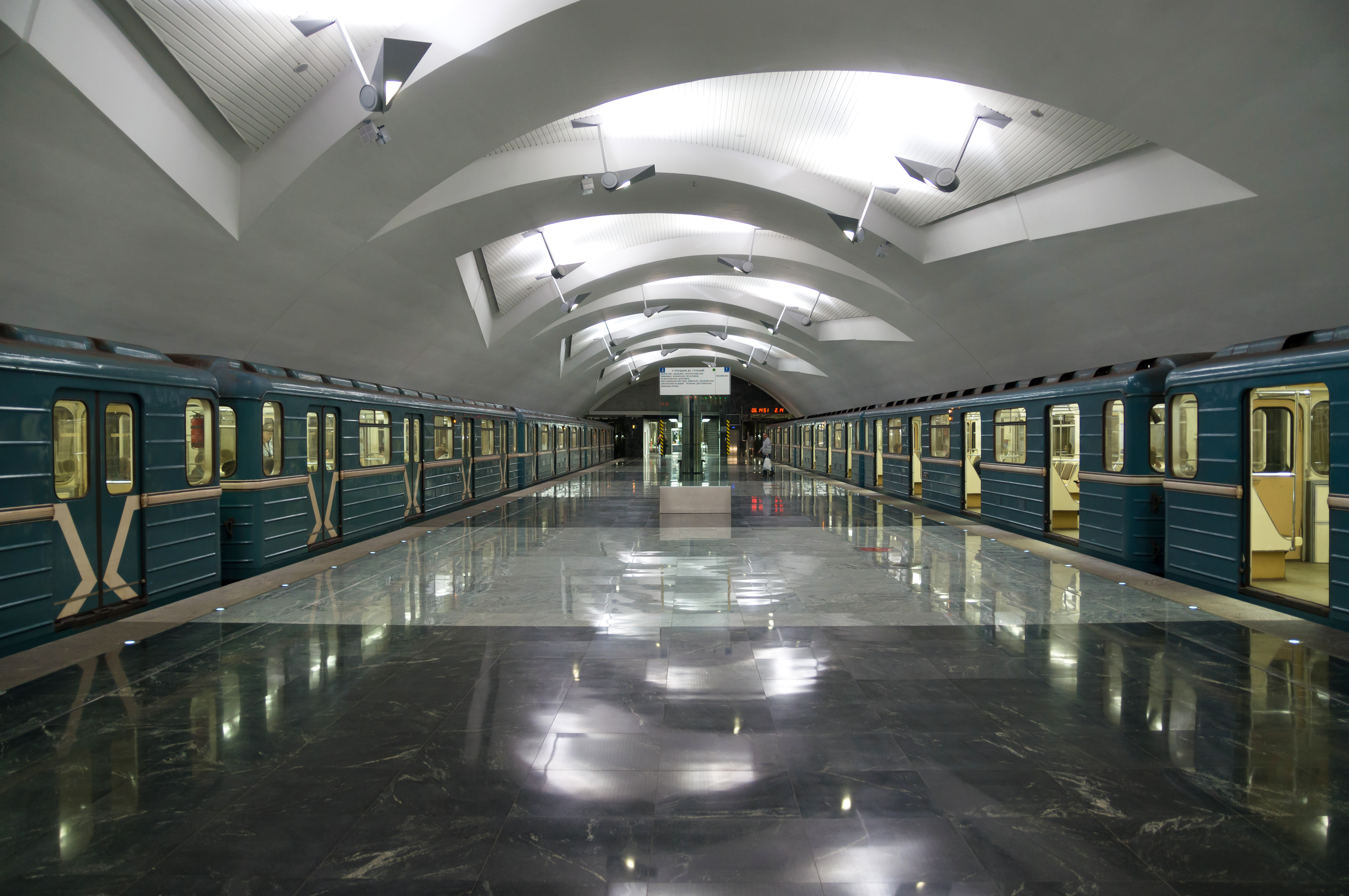

General information
- Location: Zyablikovo District, Southern Administrative Okrug; Moscow; Russia
- Coordinates: 55.6211°N 37.7437°E
- System: Moscow Metro station
- Owner: Moskovsky Metropoliten
- Line: Lyublinsko-Dmitrovskaya line
- Platforms: 1 island platform
- Tracks: 2
- Connections: Bus: 151, 287, 291, 623, 694, 704, 704к, 711, 765; Trolleybus: 11

Construction
- Structure type: Shallow single-vault
- Platform levels: 1
- Parking: Yes
- Accessible: Yes

History
- Opened: 2 December 2011; 14 years ago

Services
Preceding station	Moscow Metro	Following station
Borisovo towards Fiztekh	Lyublinsko-Dmitrovskaya line	Zyablikovo Terminus
Route map
Location
- Location within Moscow Metro

Shipilovskaya (Russian: Шипи́ловская) is a Moscow Metro station in the Zyablikovo District, Southern Administrative Okrug, Moscow. It is on the Lyublinsko-Dmitrovskaya Line, between Borisovo and Zyablikovo stations.

Shipilovskaya opened on 2 December 2011.

== Name ==
The station is named after Shipilovskaya street, near the station, which is named after Shipilovo, a small village located here before the area became part of Moscow in 1966. This village was here since the 16th century and its name is connected with Russian personal first name Shipil (sometimes Shipilo).

== History ==
In the Soviet era, the Moscow government planned to construct a metro line in South-East Moscow in the beginning of the second half of the 20th century. Early in the 1990s, construction began. During 1993 - 1996, on the west side of Musa Dzhalil Street, workers dug a huge ditch. Until 1998, there was some development—some pillars were set. The station was expected to open in 2000, but funding deficits stopped construction late in 1998. In 1999–2000 all equipment was removed. In 2004, workers retrieved a tunneling shield from the ditch ground and repaired it to use in development of Tashkent Metro. By this time, this shield had finished digging a tunnel from Zyablikovo, and another tunnel was dug partly, for about 40 metres. Another tunneling shield located there had rusted through, but in 2008–2009 it was repaired and used to finish construction. During the shutdown, the ditch filled with rain water because of lack of normally built pillars. By 2005, several sand drifts had formed, and the ditch was full of ooze. That meant there were no point in continuing development in this construction site. In that case, the ditch was dug in the fall of 2008. At the same time a new construction began in a new site, located near an intersection of Musa Dzhalil Street and Shipilovskaya street. During the following two years the development went on very quickly. On July 3, 2010, Shipilovskaya street was blocked for any traffic due to constructing conditions. In late August 2011 Shipilovskaya street was asphalted. Musa Dzhalil Street was asphalted too and enlarged. Bus stops there were reconstructed. By the end of November entrances were built, the construction was officially finished.

== Architecture ==
The main architect was Vadim Volovich of Metrogiprotans. In terms of structure, it is a shallow single-vault station with one island platform and two tracks.
