= Lyublinsko-Dmitrovskaya line =

Metro line in Moscow, Russia

Overview
- Owner: Moskovsky Metropoliten
- Locale: Moscow
- Termini: Fiztekh (North); Zyablikovo (South East)
- Stations: 26

Service
- Type: Rapid transit
- System: Moscow Metro
- Operator: Moskovsky Metropoliten
- Rolling stock: 81-717.5/714.5; 81-717.5M/714.5M; 81-717.6/714.6

History
- Opened: 28 December 1995; 30 years ago
- Last extension: 2023

Technical
- Line length: 44.3 kilometres (27.5 mi)
- Character: Underground
- Track gauge: 1,520 mm (4 ft 11 27/32 in)
- Electrification: Third rail

The Lyublinsko-Dmitrovskaya line (Russian: Любли́нско-Дми́тровская ли́ния, IPA: [lʲuˈblʲinskə ˈdmʲitrəfskəjə ˈlʲinʲɪjə]) (Line 10; Lime Line) is a line of the Moscow Metro. The line first opened in 1995 as a radial stretch of rail connecting Chkalovskaya station in the center with Maryino station in the southeast and has been greatly expanded northwards since. Before 2007, it was known as "Lyublinskaya line" (Любли́нская ли́ния) by the name of the district of Lyublino that it passes through. As of 2024, the line has 44.3 kilometres (27.5 mi) of track and 26 stations, making it the longest fully-underground line in the Moscow Metro and one of the longest tunnels in the world.

== History ==
=== Plans ===
In the early 1980s, the Moscow development plan put forward several ideas about solving the build-up that came as a result of the radial-ring alignment which has determined the development of the Moscow Metro since the mid-1950s. In the previous programme the radial lines, with an ever-increasing build-up of passengers, were forced to use the central transfer points and those on the ring, severely overcrowding the system.

In attempt to solve this problem, the future Lyublinskaya line was designed so that some of its transfer points would be outside the Koltsevaya line. This meant it would begin at the ring before extending south to the Kursky Rail Terminal, Perovsky, and Zhdanovsky. The ultimate goal of the line was to then bring the metro to the new developing districts of Maryino and Lyublino in the south-east of Moscow.

The initial design when bringing the new line to the new districts was to follow Lyublinskaya Street, not far from the bank of the Moskva River. However, after several debates, this was altered and the line would continue westwards until it reached Volzhsky Boulevard and only then turn southwards towards the districts of Lyublino. Although this left out the possibility of railway transfer with Kurskaya, it did allow the metro to enter into the heart of the region more thoroughly.

=== 1990s and later ===
The change in plans, combined with the financial crises that beset the metro construction in the 1990s, meant that the first stage opened with delays. In late 1995 the first section finally opened, and a year later it would reach Maryino. Several problems were encountered with the construction, particularly for Dubrovka. This station was left incomplete due to nearby factories heating up the soil, which prevented the freezing of the underground water to allow the construction of an escalator tunnel. However, in the late 1990s, because of the financial crises which paralyzed most of the industries, the metro-builders were able to complete the station.

Despite the delays, the line demonstrated some of the newest methods for metro-building. Deep-level stations were built on a monolithic concrete plate instead of a conventional tubular base. Also, the new wall-column design was introduced on two of the deep-level stations and a single-deck for the shallow ones. New finishing materials, such as a fibreglass vaults, were added to offer more reliable waterproofing.

The development of further extensions was for many years delayed and paralyzed by the lack of finances, and only in 2005 construction was resumed on the long-awaited second stage towards the city centre, with Trubnaya being the first to open on August 30, 2007. Sretensky Bulvar was opened on this section on December 29 the same year.

The second segment of a central extension was opened on June 19, 2010 (construction was resumed only in early 2007) and included two stations Dostoyevskaya and Maryina Roshcha.

In a separate case, a three station extension from Maryino to Zyablikovo (Lyublinsky (southern) radius) began in 1997, but in 2000 the construction sites of the stations Borisovo, Shipilovskaya, and Zyablikovo was abandoned. The importance of this is that Zyablikovo will be a transfer to the Krasnogvardeyskaya station of the Zamoskvoretskaya line. In 2008 construction finally resumed and the stations were opened on 2 December 2011, together with the transfer to the Krasnogvardeyskaya station.

The extension of the line from Maryina Roshcha northwest to Petrovsko-Razumovskaya via Butyrskaya and Fonvizinskaya was originally planned to be opened in December 2015. The projected opening date was later shifted to 2016. The stations were opened on 16 September 2016. Further extension to the north to Seligerskaya is operational and opened on 22 March 2018.

=== Timeline ===
Segment	Date opened	Length
Chkalovskaya–Volzhskaya	1995-12-28	12.1 km
Volzhskaya–Maryino	1996-12-25	5.4 km
Dubrovka	1999-12-11	N/A
Chkalovskaya–Trubnaya	2007-08-30	3.7 km
Sretensky Bulvar	2007-12-29	N/A
Trubnaya–Maryina Roshcha	2010-06-19	3.5 km
Maryino–Zyablikovo	2011-12-02	4.5 km
Maryina Roshcha–Petrovsko-Razumovskaya	2016-09-16	4.4 km
Petrovsko-Razumovskaya–Seligerskaya	2018-03-22	4.9 km
Seligerskaya–Fiztekh	2023-09-07	6 km
Total:	26 stations	

== Stations ==
Station Name		Transfers
English	Russian	Transfers
Fiztekh	'Физтех	
Lianozovo	Лианозово	Lianozovo
Yakhromskaya	Яхромская	
Seligerskaya	Селигерская	
Verkhniye Likhobory	Верхние Лихоборы	
Okruzhnaya	Окружная	Okruzhnaya; Okruzhnaya
Petrovsko-Razumovskaya	Петровско-Разумовская	Petrovsko-Razumovskaya; Petrovsko-Razumovskaya; Petrovsko-Razumovskaya
Fonvizinskaya	Фонвизинская	
Butyrskaya	Бутырская	Ostankino
Maryina Roshcha	Марьина Роща	Maryina Roshcha; Maryina Roshcha
Dostoyevskaya	Достоевская	Suvorovskaya
Trubnaya	Трубная	Tsvetnoy Bulvar
Sretensky Bulvar	Сретенский бульвар	Chistye Prudy; Turgenevskaya
Chkalovskaya	Чкаловская	Kurskaya; Kurskaya; Moscow Kursky
Rimskaya	Римская	Ploshchad Ilyicha; Serp i Molot
Krestyanskaya Zastava	Крестьянская застава	Proletarskaya
Dubrovka	Дубровка	Dubrovka
Kozhukhovskaya	Кожуховская	
Yuzhny Port	Южный порт	
Pechatniki	Печатники	Pechatniki; Pechatniki
Volzhskaya	Волжская	
Lyublino	Люблино	
Bratislavskaya	Братиславская	
Maryino	Марьино	
Borisovo	Борисово	
Shipilovskaya	Шипиловская	
Zyablikovo	Зябликово	Krasnogvardeyskaya
Razvilka	Развилка	
Volodarskoye Shosse	Володарское шоссе	

== Rolling stock ==
The line is served by the Pechatniki depot (#15) and Likhobory depot (#18) . 81-717/714 (including .5 and .5M modifications) wagons are used since the opening of the line. In 1998-2004 some new 81-720/721 (and .1) "Yauza" trains were received, but now their production is stopped. Some "Yauza" trains (except the original, which were retired) are still in service, but all the new rolling stock used on the line are 81-717/714.5/.5M and 81-717/714.6.

Subway car types used on the line over the years:

-Series 81-717.5: 1995–present

-Series 81-717.5M: 1995–present

-Series 81-720/721: 1998 - 2008

-Series 81-720.1/721.1: 2005 - 2019

-Series 81-717.6: 2011–present

-Series 81-760/761: 2016 (one train)

== Future plans ==
In early November 2017, it became known that between the stations Kozhukhovskaya and Pechatniki of the Lublin radius, a new station Yuzhny Port could be built, which will be located in the industrial zone. It is scheduled to be constructed from 2022 through 2023.

In the Fall of 2019, Andrey Bochkarev confirmed that the station is planned to be built before the end of 2023. According to the targeted investment program of Moscow from 2022 to 2023, 7 billion rubles will be allocated for the construction of the station with the working name Yuzhny Port.
