= Pechatniki (Lyublinsko-Dmitrovskaya line) =

Moscow Metro station

Pechatniki Печатники
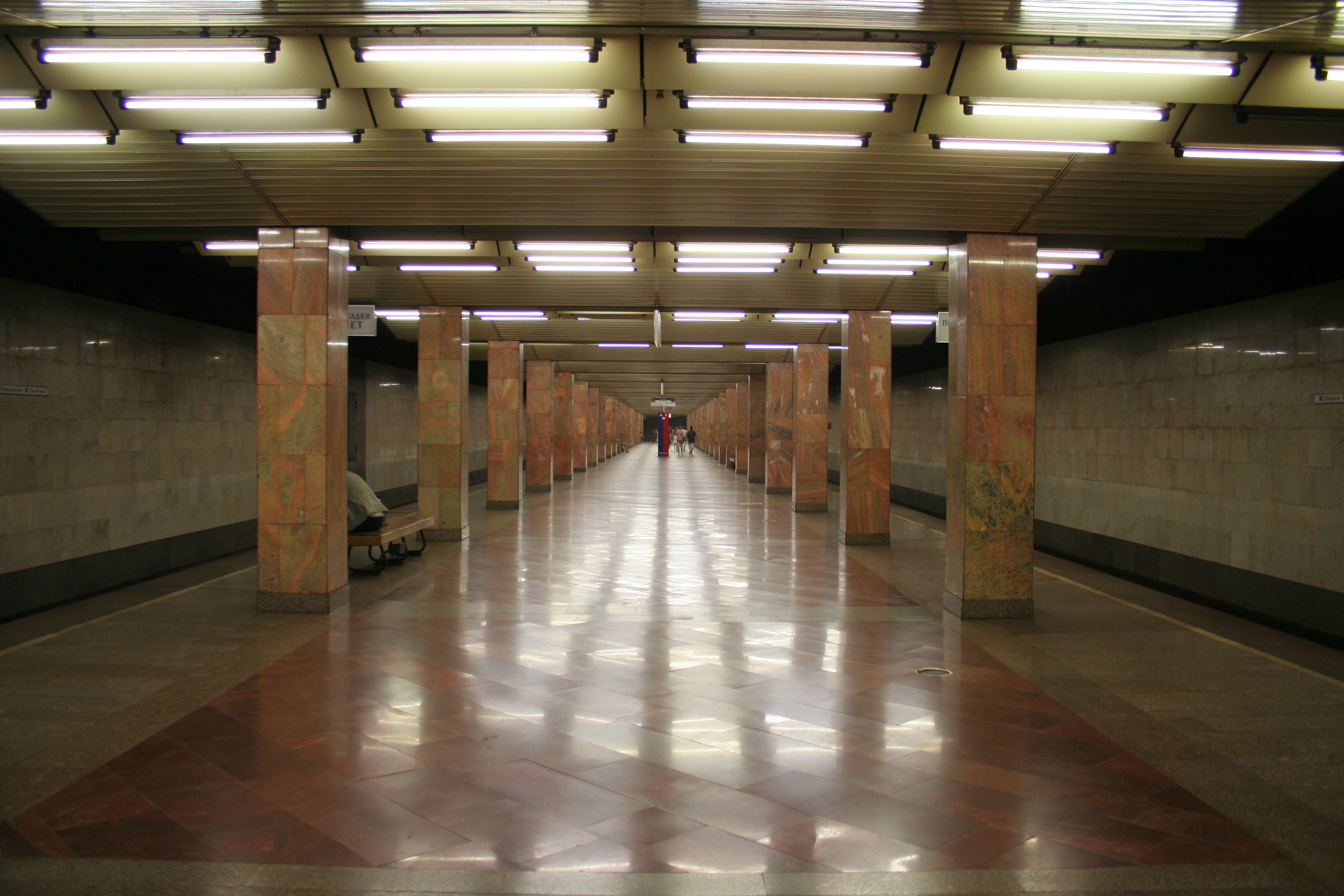

General information
- Location: Pechatniki District; South-Eastern Administrative Okrug; Moscow; Russia
- Coordinates: 55.6934°N 37.7270°E
- System: Moscow Metro station
- Owner: Moskovsky Metropoliten
- Line: Lyublinsko-Dmitrovskaya line
- Platforms: 1 island platform
- Tracks: 2
- Connections: Bus: 30, 161, 193, 292, 646, 703

Construction
- Depth: 5 metres (16 ft)
- Platform levels: 1
- Parking: No

Other information
- Station code: 155

History
- Opened: 28 December 1995; 30 years ago

Services
Preceding station	Moscow Metro	Following station
Kozhukhovskaya towards Fiztekh	Lyublinsko-Dmitrovskaya line	Volzhskaya towards Zyablikovo
Tekstilshchiki anticlockwise / outer	Bolshaya Koltsevaya line transfer at Pechatniki	Nagatinsky Zaton clockwise / inner
Route map
Location
- Location within Moscow Metro

Pechatniki (Russian: Печатники) is a station of the Moscow Metro's Lyublinsko-Dmitrovskaya Line. The station was opened on 28 December 1995 as part of the first stage of the Lyublinsky radius, and is named after the district that it is situated in. The station is typical pillar-trispan, although it was the last of such design to be opened in Moscow to date. "Pechatniki" is the shallowest underground station in Moscow Metro.

The architects Yuri Orlov and A.Nekrasov designed the station in a unique way with no lighting above the black ceiling platforms and central wave-like anodised aluminium ceiling. The pillars are revetted with pink marble whist, the walls show greyish tint. The floor is laid with red and grey granite.

The station has one surface vestibule with access to Shosseinaya, Polbina and Guryanova streets. The vestibule is separately decorated with a large metallic panno Muscovites' work and rest (artist V. Bubnov). Just before the station is a service branch leading into the Pechatniki depot that serves the Lyublinskaya Line.

A transfer to the Bolshaya Koltsevaya line at Pechatniki is opened on 4 January 2025.

Yuzhny Port is expected to be built north of the station in 2030.

== Gallery ==
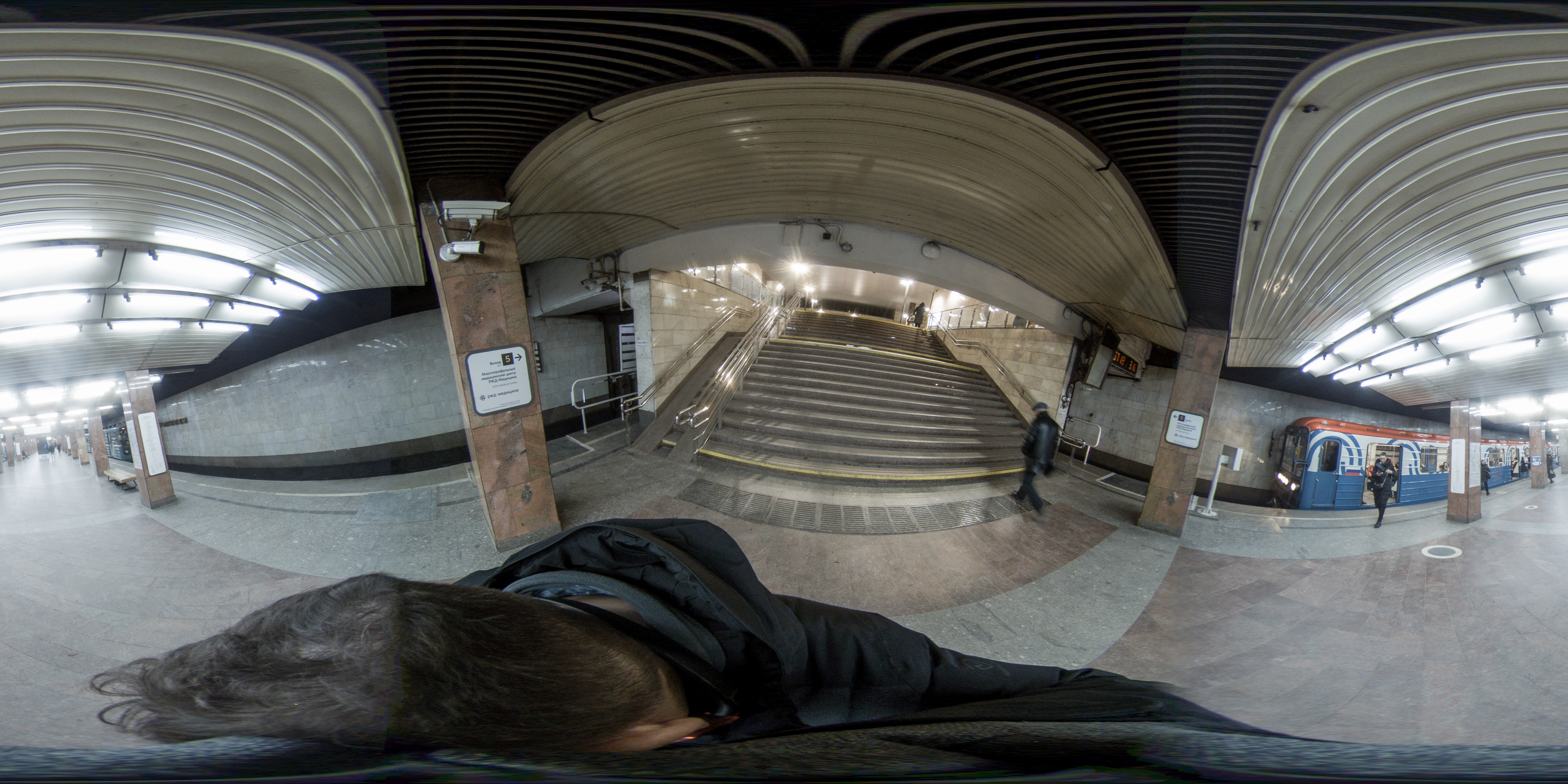
Station hall (view as a 360° interactive panorama)

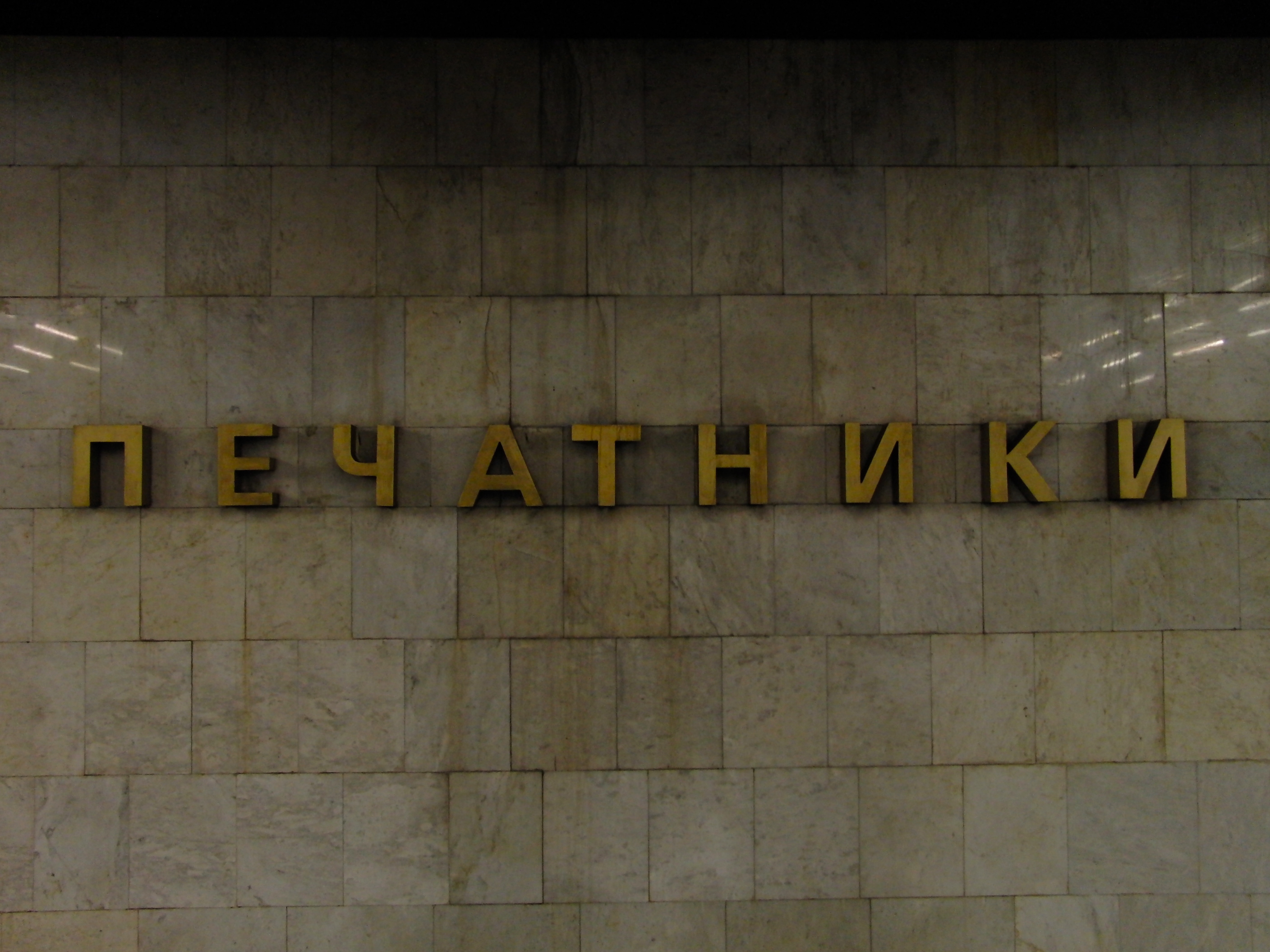
Name of station on the wall

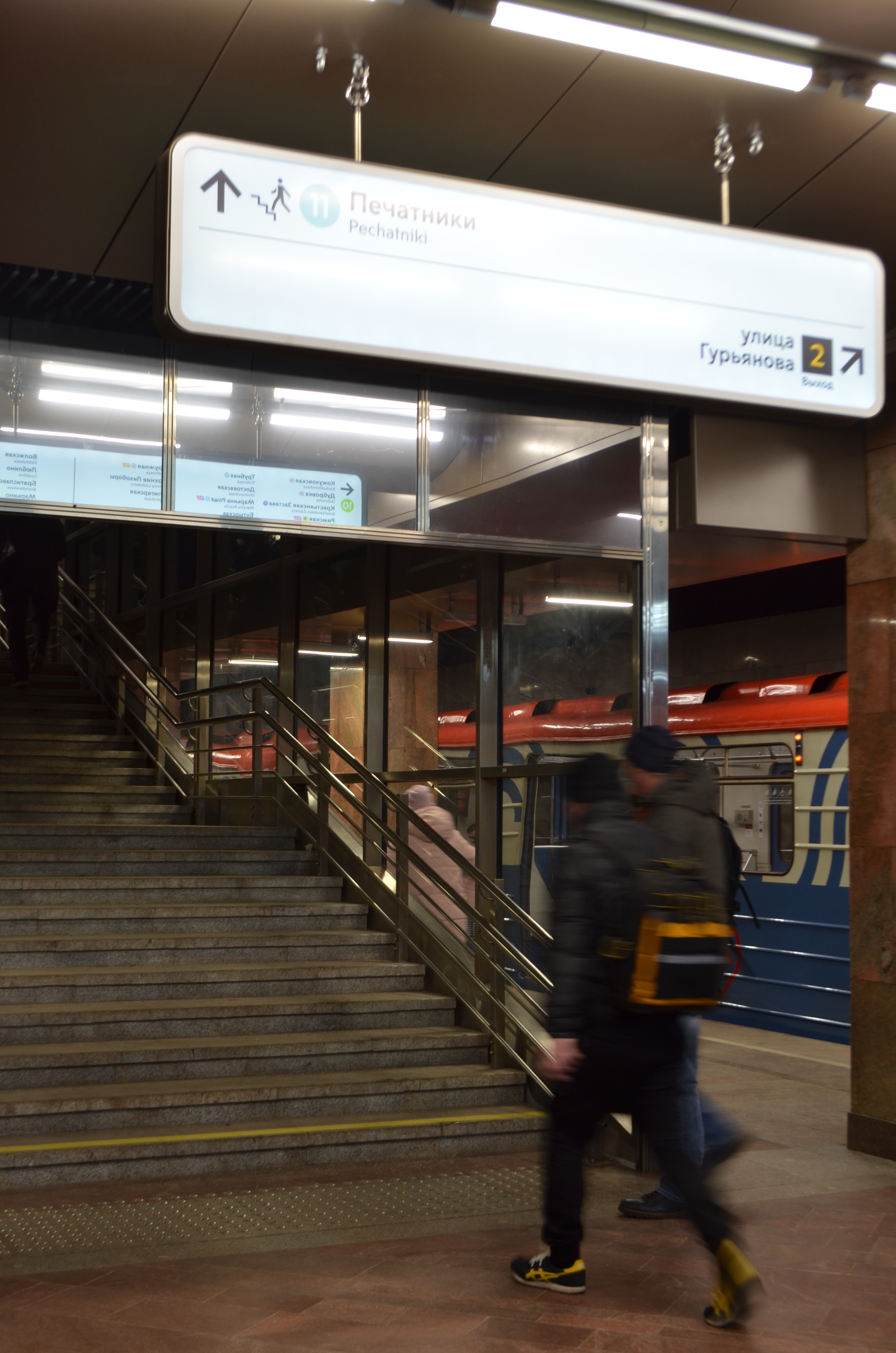
Transfer (to BKL station), March 1, 2023
