= Volzhskaya (Moscow Metro) =

Moscow Metro station

Volzhskaya Волжская
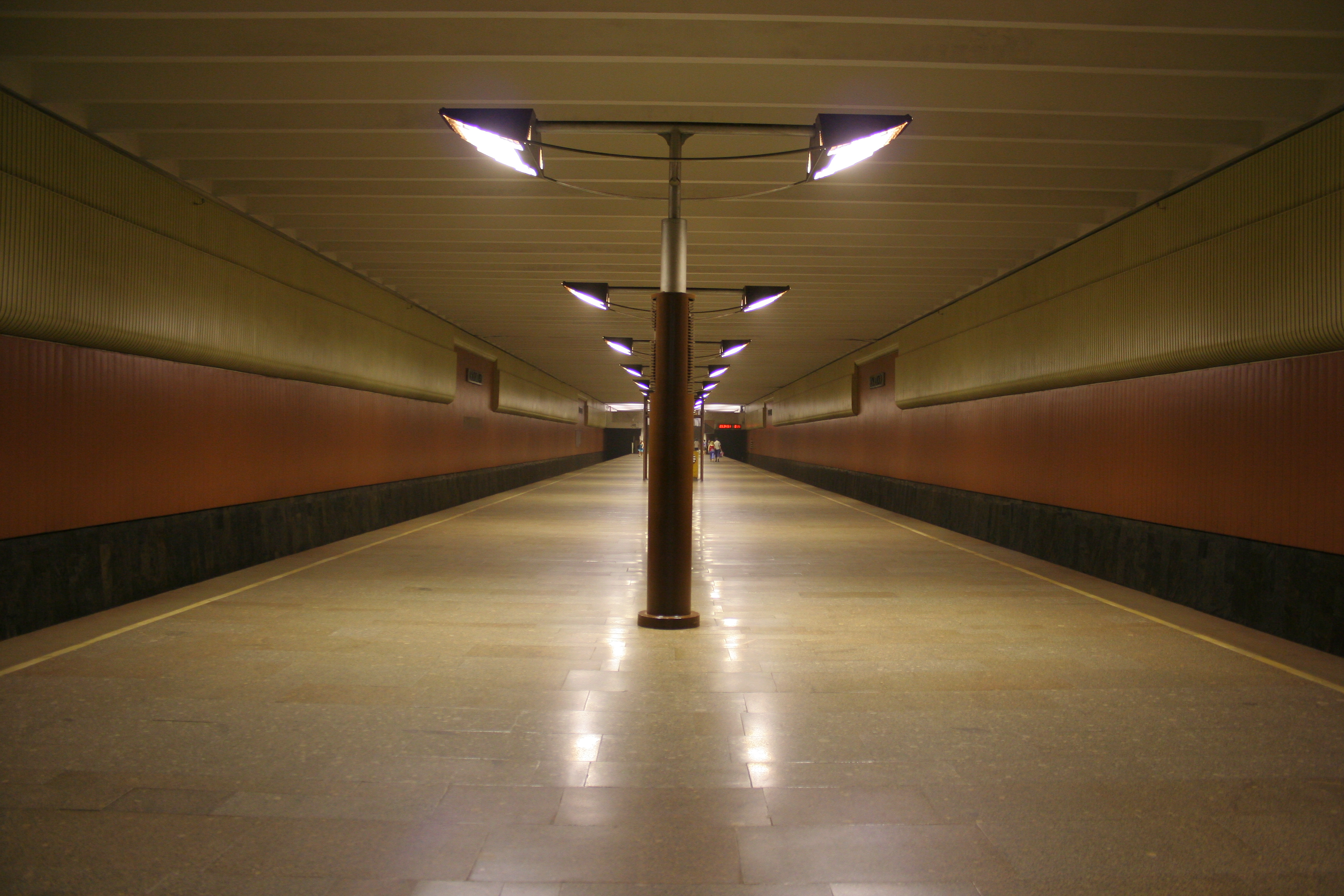

General information
- Location: Tekstilshchiki District, South-Eastern Administrative Okrug; Moscow; Russia
- Coordinates: 55.6909°N 37.7530°E
- System: Moscow Metro station
- Owner: Moskovsky Metropoliten
- Line: Lyublinsko-Dmitrovskaya line
- Platforms: 1 island platform
- Tracks: 2
- Connections: Bus: 228, 658, 713; Trolleybus: 74

Construction
- Depth: 8 metres (26 ft)
- Platform levels: 1
- Parking: No

Other information
- Station code: 156

History
- Opened: 28 December 1995; 30 years ago

Services
Preceding station	Moscow Metro	Following station
Pechatniki towards Fiztekh	Lyublinsko-Dmitrovskaya line	Lyublino towards Zyablikovo
Route map
Location
- Location within Moscow Metro

Volzhskaya (Russian: Волжская) is a station on the Moscow Metro's Lyublinsko-Dmitrovskaya Line. The station was opened on 28 December 1995 as the final part of the first stage of the Lyblinsky radius and was the line's terminus for just under a year. Just behind the station a former cross junction tunnels can still be seen.

The station is the first in Moscow to be built to a new design known as a single deck. In such a case the ceiling plate is made of individual long concrete slabs that are used for automobile bridges and they are lowered on the strengthened walls of the station. Moreover, this space automatically includes the vestibules and other construction details allowing more efficient and economical approach. The architect V.Volovich took the extra space offered by the high ceiling and revetted the walls with enameled aluminium consisting of a pale yellow colour high up and red lower down. The floor is covered with grey granite. Innovative design also came for the lighting which consists of centrally mounted poles with square floodlamps on either side. Also unique are two yellow booths which contain benches for passengers to sit on.

The station has two underground vestibules which are located under the Volzhsky boulevard.
