= Brateyevo District =

Brateyevo District район Братеево (Russian)
- District
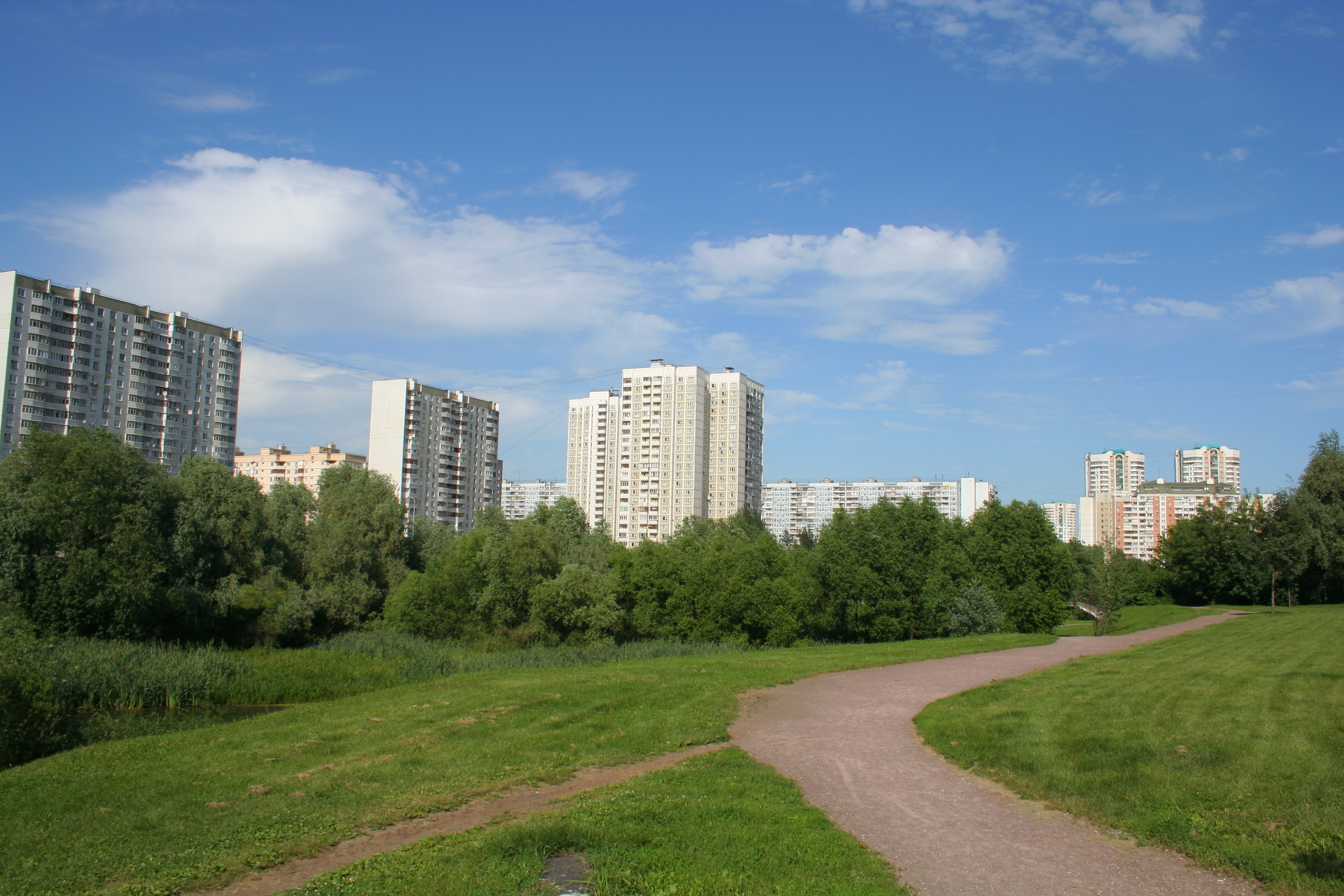
- Apartment blocks in Brateyevo District

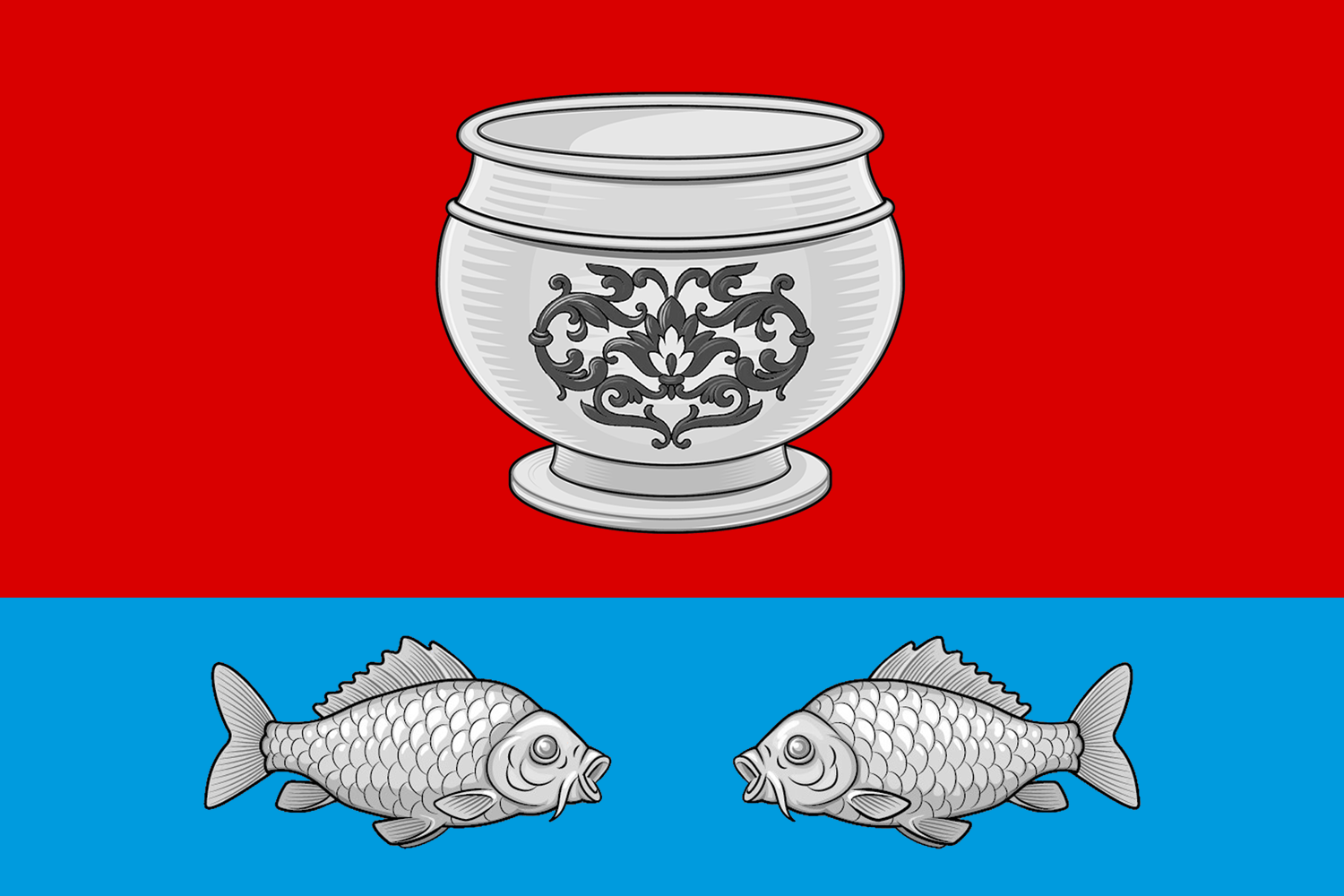
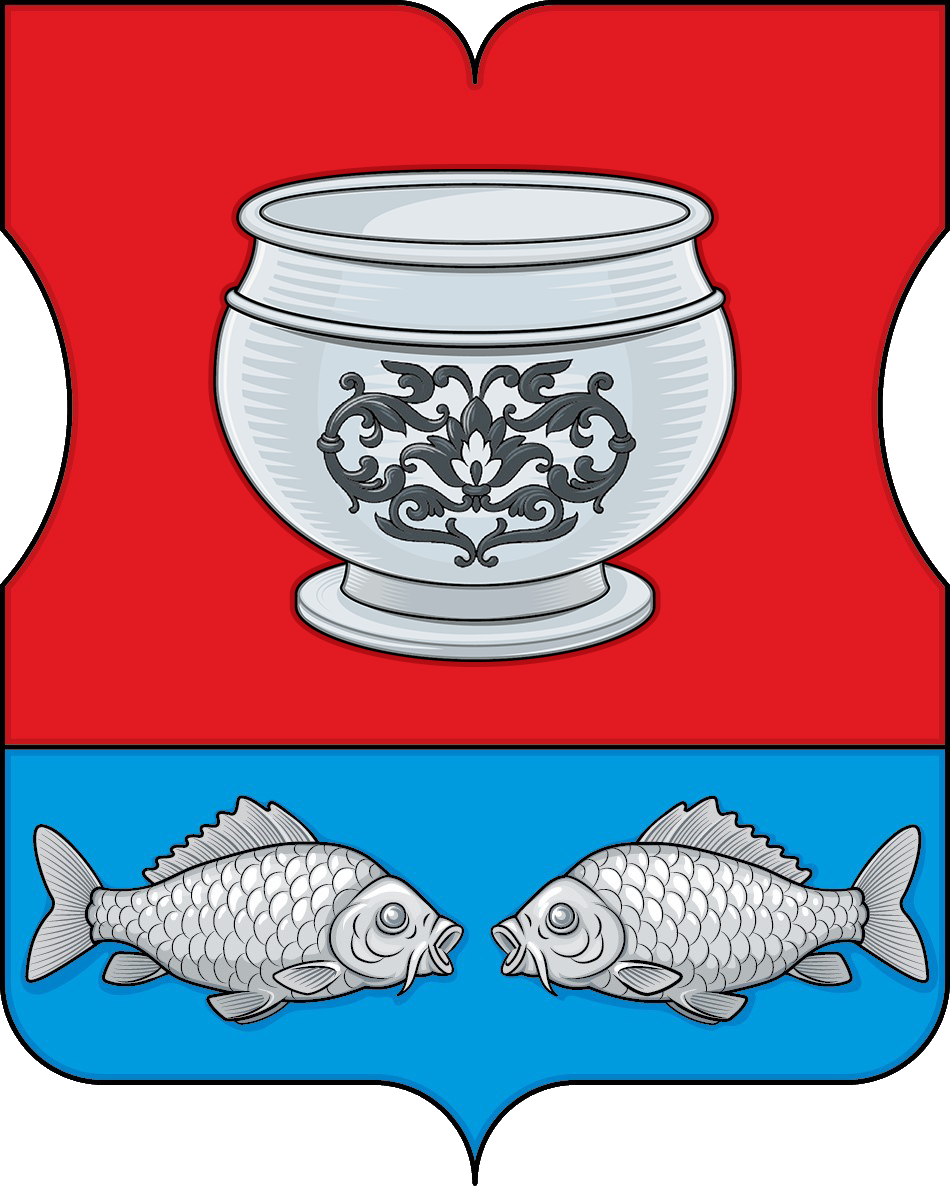
- Flag Coat of arms
- Location of Brateyevo District in Moscow
- Coordinates: 55°38′02″N 37°45′49″E
- Country: Russia
- Federal subject: Moscow

Area
  - Total: 7.63 km^{2} (2.95 sq mi)

Population (2010 Census)
  - Total: 102,600
  - Density: 13,400/km^{2} (34,800/sq mi)
  - Urban: 100%
  - Rural: 0%
- Time zone: UTC+
- OKTMO ID: 45913000
- Website: https://web.archive.org/web/20110719065745/http://br.uao.mos.ru/

Brateyevo District (Russian: райо́н Брате́ево) is a district of Southern Administrative Okrug of the federal city of Moscow, Russia, located in the southeast of Moscow on the right bank of the Moskva River. Population: 102,600 (2010 census); 94,644 (2002 census). The area of the district is 7.63 square kilometers (2.95 sq mi).

== History ==
Several pagan mounds dated back to ancient settlements have been discovered on the territory of Brateyevo District. The settlement transformed into the prosperous village located on the Brateyevo hill which later gave its name to the district. There are two common versions of origin the name of the village. According to one, the name the toponym "Brateyevo" came from the personal name "Bratey". According to another version, in the 16th century, the nearest villages (Borisovo and Besedy) belonged to the Godunov family, while Brateyevo himself was owned by Boris Godunov’s brother (Russian: брат), Semyon.

In 1960, Brateyevo village became administrative part of Moscow. In the 1980s, Brateyevo village has been demolished during the construction of the modern district.

== Transportation ==
=== Metro ===
- Borisovo, opened on December 2, 2011; located in western part of district
- Alma-Atinskaya, opened on December 24, 2012; located in south-eastern part of district

Nearest stations, which are not located in Brateyevo District but accessible using public transportation:

- Maryino
- Kashirskaya
