= Ugreshskaya =

Station on the Moscow Central Circle

Ugreshskaya Угрешская
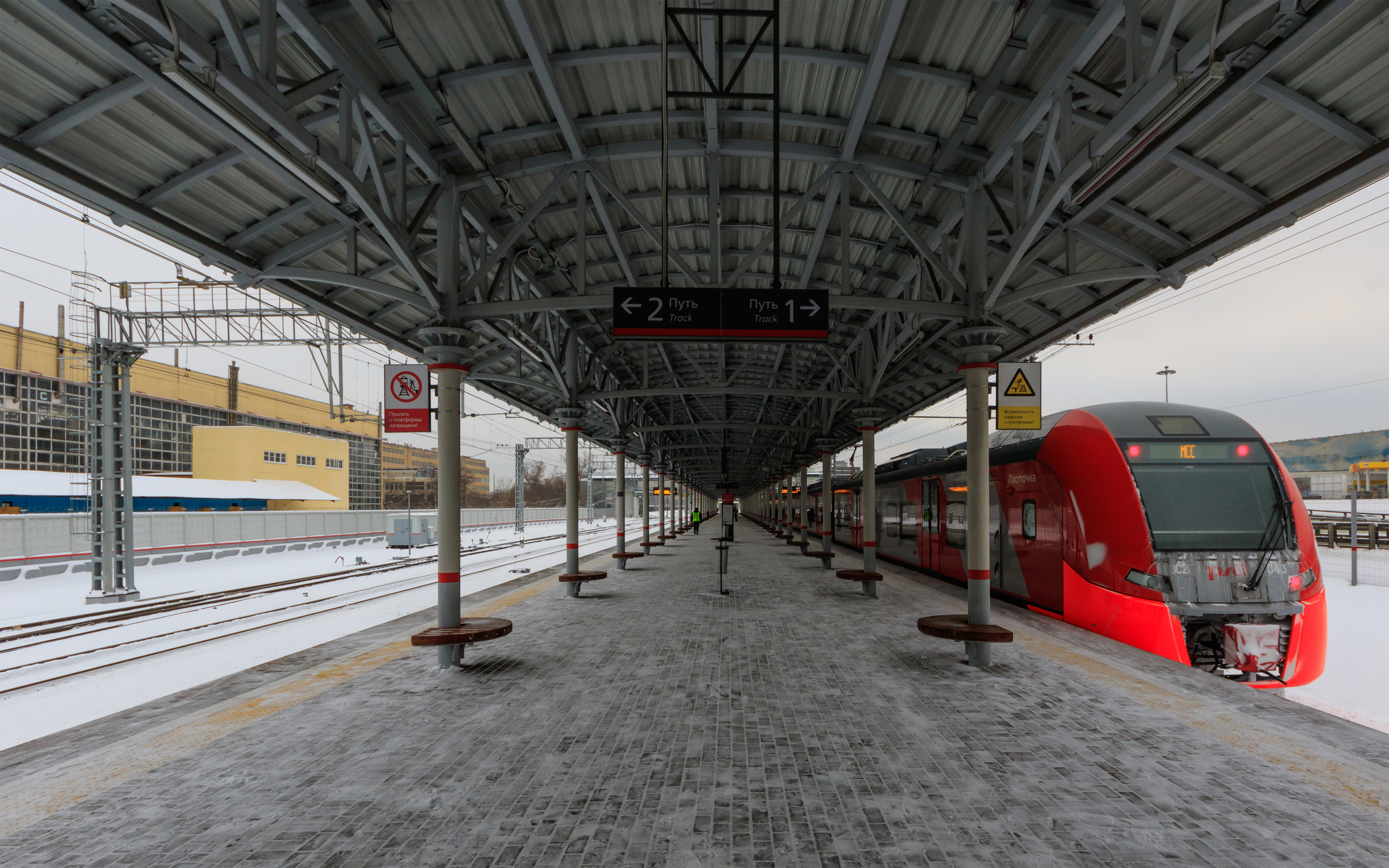

General information
- Coordinates: 55.7185°N 37.6976°E
- System: Moscow Metro
- Line: Moscow Central Circle
- Platforms: 1 island platform
- Tracks: 2

Construction
- Structure type: At-grade

History
- Opened: 10 September 2016; 9 years ago

Services
| Preceding station | Moscow Metro | Following station |
|---|---|---|
| Novokhokhlovskaya anticlockwise / outer | Moscow Central Circle | Dubrovka clockwise / inner |
Out-of-station interchange
| Preceding station | Moscow Metro | Following station |
|---|---|---|
| Proletarskaya towards Planernaya | Tagansko-Krasnopresnenskaya line transfer at Volgogradsky Prospekt | Tekstilshchiki towards Kotelniki |
Route map
Location
- Location within Moscow Metro

Ugreshskaya (Russian: Угрешская) is a station on the Moscow Central Circle that opened in September 2016.

== Name ==
The station's name from the street, Ugreshskaya Ulitsa, in which it is situated. The name comes from the nearby Nikolo-Ugreshsky Monastery and is shared with a station on the Moscow Railway's Little Ring line.

Originally, the name of the station was planned to be Volgogradskaya; however, the city renamed it in August 2016, prior to opening.

== Transfer ==
From January 2017, passengers may make out-of-station transfers to Volgogradsky Prospekt station on the Metro's Tagansko-Krasnopresnenskaya Line. Initially a free transfer was not organized due to the considerable remoteness of these two stations. This is the longest transfer between the MCC and Metro line in the entire system, the average transit time is nearly 12 minutes.
