= Zyablikovo (Moscow Metro) =

Moscow Metro station

Zyablikovo Зябликово
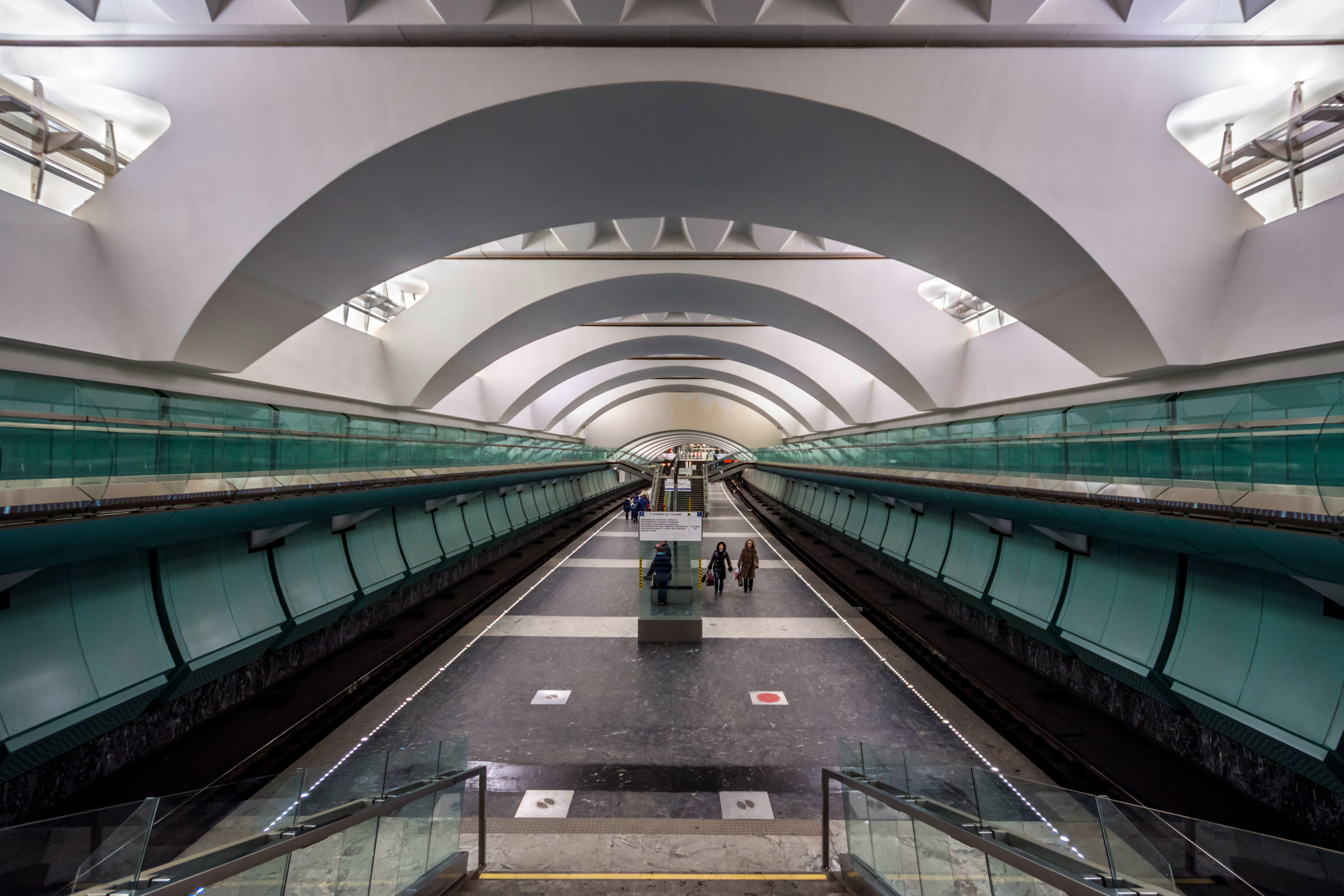

General information
- Location: Zyablikovo District, Southern Administrative Okrug; Moscow; Russia
- Coordinates: 55.6124°N 37.7453°E
- System: Moscow Metro station
- Owner: Moskovsky Metropoliten
- Line: Lyublinsko-Dmitrovskaya line
- Platforms: 1 island platform
- Tracks: 2
- Connections: Bus: 37, 37э, 151, 263, 287, 298, 694, 704, 704к, 711, 719, 755, 768, 790.

Construction
- Structure type: Shallow single-vault
- Platform levels: 1
- Parking: Yes
- Accessible: Yes

History
- Opened: 2 December 2011; 14 years ago

Services
Preceding station	Moscow Metro	Following station
Shipilovskaya towards Fiztekh	Lyublinsko-Dmitrovskaya line	Terminus
Domodedovskaya towards Khovrino	Zamoskvoretskaya line transfer at Krasnogvardeyskaya	Alma-Atinskaya Terminus
Route map
Location
- Location within Moscow Metro

Zyablikovo (Russian: Зя́бликово) is a Moscow Metro station in the Zyablikovo District, Southern Administrative Okrug, Moscow. It is located on the Lyublinsko-Dmitrovskaya line serving as its southern terminus.

The station opened on 2 December 2011.

Zyablikovo is a transfer station to Krasnogvardeyskaya of the Zamoskvoretskaya line. At the time of opening the transfer, both Krasnogvardeyskaya and Zyablikovo were the terminal stations on their respective lines.

The station is located in the southern part of Moscow, on the border of Zyablikovo and Orekhovo-Borisovo Yuzhnoye districts.

There is a track connection to the Zamoskvoretskaya line south of this station, where Lyublinsko-Dmitrovskaya line trains terminate.

== Name ==
The station is named after the village of Zyablikovo, formerly located to the south of the station, which in 1960s became part of Moscow.
