= Fiztekh (Moscow Metro) =

Moscow Metro station, Line 10

Fiztekh Физтех
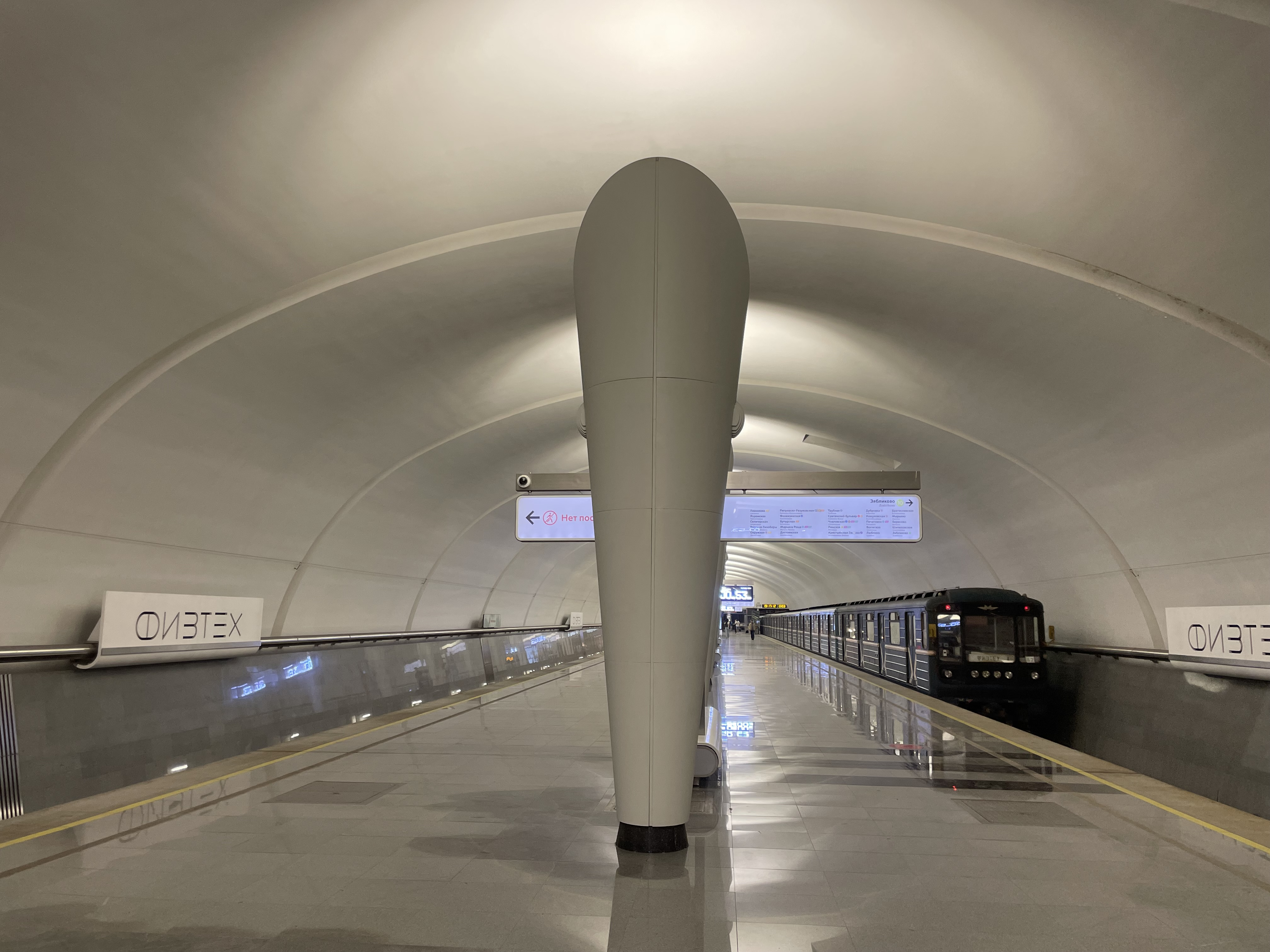

General information
- Location: Severny District; North-Eastern Administrative Okrug; Moscow; Russia
- Coordinates: 55.9226°N 37.5467°E
- Line: Lyublinsko-Dmitrovskaya line

Services
Preceding station	Moscow Metro	Following station
Terminus	Lyublinsko-Dmitrovskaya line	Lianozovo towards Zyablikovo
Route map
Location
- Location within Moscow Metro

Fiztekh (Russian: Физтех) is a Moscow metro station. It was opened on 7 September 2023 as the northern terminus of Lyublinsko-Dmitrovskaya line. The adjacent station is Lianozovo. As of 2023, Fiztekh is the northernmost metro station of the Moscow Metro.

The station is located in Severny District of Moscow, close to Dmitrovskoye Highway.

The name of the station is an abbreviation of the Moscow Institute of Physics and Technology, which campus is located about 2 kilometres (1.2 mi) from the station.
