= Troika card =

Smart card for public transport in Moscow

Troika Тройка
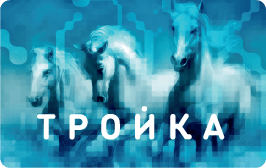
- Front of a Troika card
- Location: Moscow
- Launched: April 2, 2013; 12 years ago
- Technology: NFC
- Currency: Russian ruble (10000 ₽ maximum load)
- Stored-value: Pay as you go
- Credit expiry: After 5 years from last top-up
- Auto recharge: Yes
- Validity: Moscow Metro, CSPC, Russian Railways, Mosgortrans, MK MZD
- Website: transport.mos.ru

The Troika card (Russian: Тройка) is a reusable contactless smart card used to pay for public transport in Moscow, including bus, trolleybus, or trams. It can also be used to pay for car parking, bicycle rental, and other city transport services. It was introduced on April 2, 2013. Passengers can buy a Troika card at any Metro ticket office or automated Mosgortrans ticket kiosk. They can top it up at Metro ticket windows and automated Metro vending machines as well as automated vending machines, mobile phone stores, and payment terminals or via the internet, SMS, electronic payment systems, and smartphone apps.

== Fare options ==
The 90-minute ticket fare is included on Troika, allowing passengers one ride on the metro or the Moscow Monorail plus an unlimited number of rides on surface transport within 90 minutes.

It is possible to purchase any ticket – Unified, 90 Minute, and TAT – for any number of rides, including unlimited tickets as well as unlimited rail passes and one-trip tickets on the suburban trains. However, this does not include passes for 10, 20, 60, and 90 trips.

The data in this table is valid as of August 24, 2024.

Type	Price in rubles	Cost per trip	Valid time and remarks		Image	
Troika refillable e-purse card
1 trip on metro, MCD within central zone, road vehicle and/or monorail	57			+ 50 rubles deposit		
1 trip on MCD within suburban zone	76		trolleybus, bus or tram	+ 50 rubles deposit		
90 minute transfer ride	85		Unlimited transfers on trolleybus, bus or tram + 1 metro and/or monorail trip in any order.	+ 50 rubles deposit		
Unified (единый): 1 trip on metro and/or monorail, trolleybus, bus or tram
1 ride	70	70	Valid for 5 days			
2 rides	140	70	Valid for 5 days			
60 rides	3420	57				
Unlimited 24 hours	340		Valid upon usage	+ 50 rubles deposit		
Unlimited 3 days	650		Valid upon usage	+ 50 rubles deposit		
Unlimited 30 days	2870		Valid upon usage	+ 50 rubles deposit		Valid upon purchase
Unlimited 90 days	6950			+ 50 rubles deposit		Valid upon purchase
Unlimited 365 days	20500			+ 50 rubles deposit		Valid upon purchase
Social Transport Card (for student)				+ 50 rubles deposit		
Unlimited 30 days (metro+MCC+MCD)	540					
Unlimited 30 days (bus+tram)	345					
Unlimited 30 days (all transport)	815					
Unlimited 90 days (metro+MCC+MCD)	1510					
Unlimited 90 days (bus+tram)	980					
Unlimited 90 days (all transport)	2320					
Bus-Tram: 1 trip on bus or tram
Unlimited 30 days	1820		Valid upon purchase	+ 50 rubles deposit		
Unlimited 90 days	4800		Valid upon purchase	+ 50 rubles deposit		
Unlimited 365 days	14750		Valid upon purchase	+ 50 rubles deposit		
Other tickets
Biometric payment system (1 ride on metro+MCC+MCD)	53					
Bank card	64					
Serves «По пути»	64					

- Transfer between the nearest metro station and the monorail station (VDNKh - Vystavochny Tsentr or Timiryazevskaya (Moscow Metro) - Timiryazevskaya (Monorail)) within 90 minutes with any type of card counts as 1 ride and does not deduct fare of second trip.
- 90-minute transfer discount does not apply to trolleybus, bus and tram in Troitsky Administrative Okrug, elektrichka trains or marshrutka (minibus).
- Unlimited cards cannot be used consecutively within 7 minutes.

== See also ==
- List of smart cards
