= Ulitsa Milashenkova =

Moscow Monorail station

Ulitsa Milashenkova Улица Милашенкова
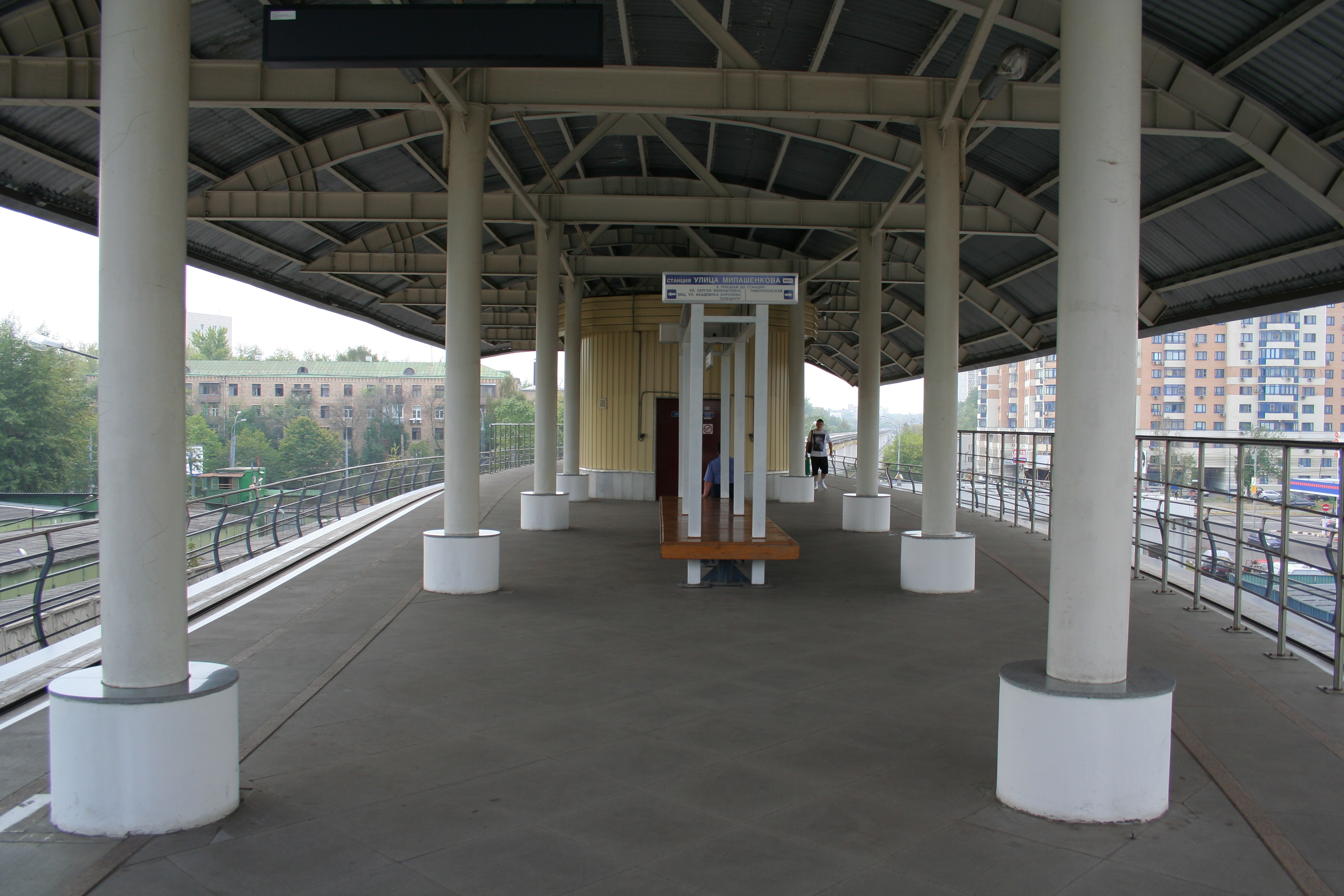

General information
- Location: Butyrsky District; North-Eastern Administrative Okrug; Moscow; Russia
- Coordinates: 55.8218°N 37.5911°E
- Elevation: 6 metres (20 ft)
- System: Moscow Monorail station
- Owner: Moskovsky Metropoliten
- Line: #13 Moscow Monorail
- Platforms: 1 (in curves, S like)
- Tracks: 2
- Connections: Bus: 12, 12к, 19, 23; Trolleybus: 3, 29

Construction
- Platform levels: 1
- Parking: No
- Accessible: Yes

Other information
- Station code: 201

History
- Opened: 20 November 2004 (exit only); 1 September 2006 (full service)
- Closed: 28 June 2025

Services
Preceding station	Moscow Metro	Following station
Timiryazevskaya Terminus	Moscow Monorail	Teletsentr towards Ulitsa Sergeya Eyzenshteyna
Petrovsko-Razumovskaya towards Fiztekh	Lyublinsko-Dmitrovskaya line transfer at Fonvizinskaya	Butyrskaya towards Zyablikovo
Route map
Location

Ulitsa Milashenkova (Russian: Улица Милашенкова, English: Milashenkova Street) was a station of the Moscow Monorail. It was located in the Butyrsky District of the North-Eastern Administrative Okrug of Moscow.

== History ==
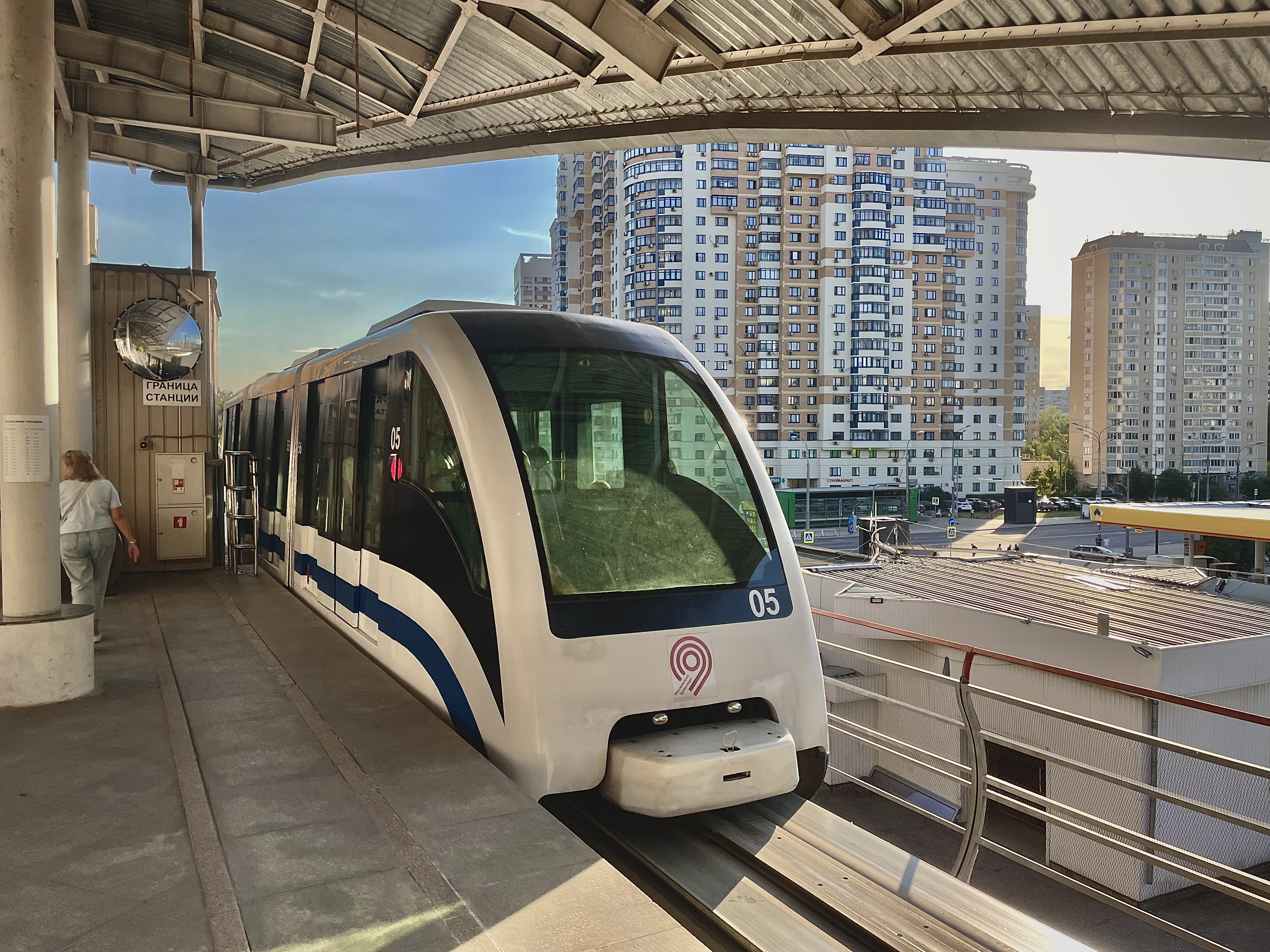
Moscow Monorail train at "Ulitsa Milashenkova" station

The station was opened on 20 November 2004 along with other 4 stations of the monorail line (all but the southern terminus Timiryazevskaya which was opened 9 days later). It began operation in "excursion mode". Only two trains were operating at the line, the interval between trains was as long as 30 minutes and station hours were from 10:00 to 16:00. The passengers could only board the trains at Ulitsa Sergeya Eisensteina station.

On 10 January 2008 the line began regular operation serving passengers and allowing them board trains at any station of the line.
