= Ulitsa Akademika Korolyova =

Moscow Monorail station

Ulitsa Akademika Korolyova Улица Академика Королёва
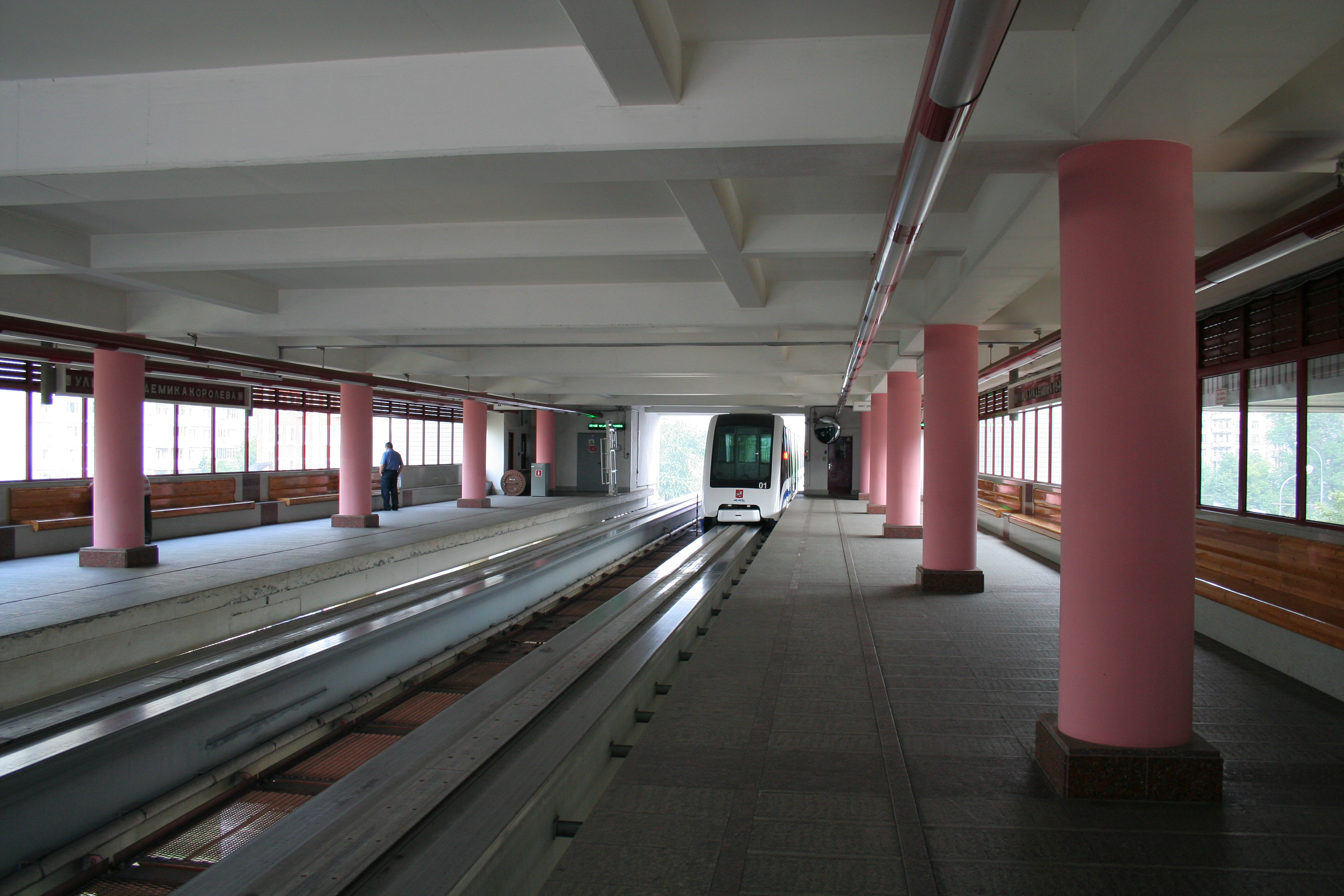

General information
- Location: Ostankinsky District; North-Eastern Administrative Okrug; Moscow; Russia
- Coordinates: 55.8218°N 37.6269°E
- Elevation: 12 metres (39 ft)
- System: Moscow Monorail station
- Owner: Moskovsky Metropoliten
- Line: #13 Moscow Monorail
- Platforms: 2 side platforms
- Tracks: 2
- Connections: Trolleybus: 36, 73; Tram: 11, 17, 25; Bus: M9, T13, 15, 311, 379

Construction
- Platform levels: 2 (cash deck hall is above the platforms)
- Parking: No
- Accessible: Yes

Other information
- Station code: 203

History
- Opened: 20 November 2004 (exit only); 1 September 2006 (full service)
- Closed: 28 June 2025

Services
Preceding station	Moscow Metro	Following station
Teletsentr towards Timiryazevskaya	Moscow Monorail	Vystavochny Tsentr towards Ulitsa Sergeya Eyzenshteyna
Route map
Location

Ulitsa Akademika Korolyova (Russian: Улица Академика Королёва, English: Akademika Koroleva Street) was a station of the Moscow Monorail. It was located in the Ostankino District of the North-Eastern Administrative Okrug of Moscow.

== History ==
The station was opened on 20 November 2004 along with other 4 stations of the monorail line (All but the southern terminus Timiryazevskaya which was opened 9 days later). It began operation in "excursion mode". Only two trains were operating at the line, the interval between trains was as long as 30 minutes and station hours were from 10:00 to 16:00. The passengers could only board the trains at Ulitsa Sergeya Eisensteina station.

On 10 January 2008 the line began regular operation serving passengers and allowing them board trains at any station of the line.

== Features ==
This station have some features in contrast to the other Moscow monorail stations:

- Station has two platforms.
- Height of 12 metres (39 ft).
- Closed type.
