= Teletsentr =

Moscow Monorail station

Teletsentr Телецентр
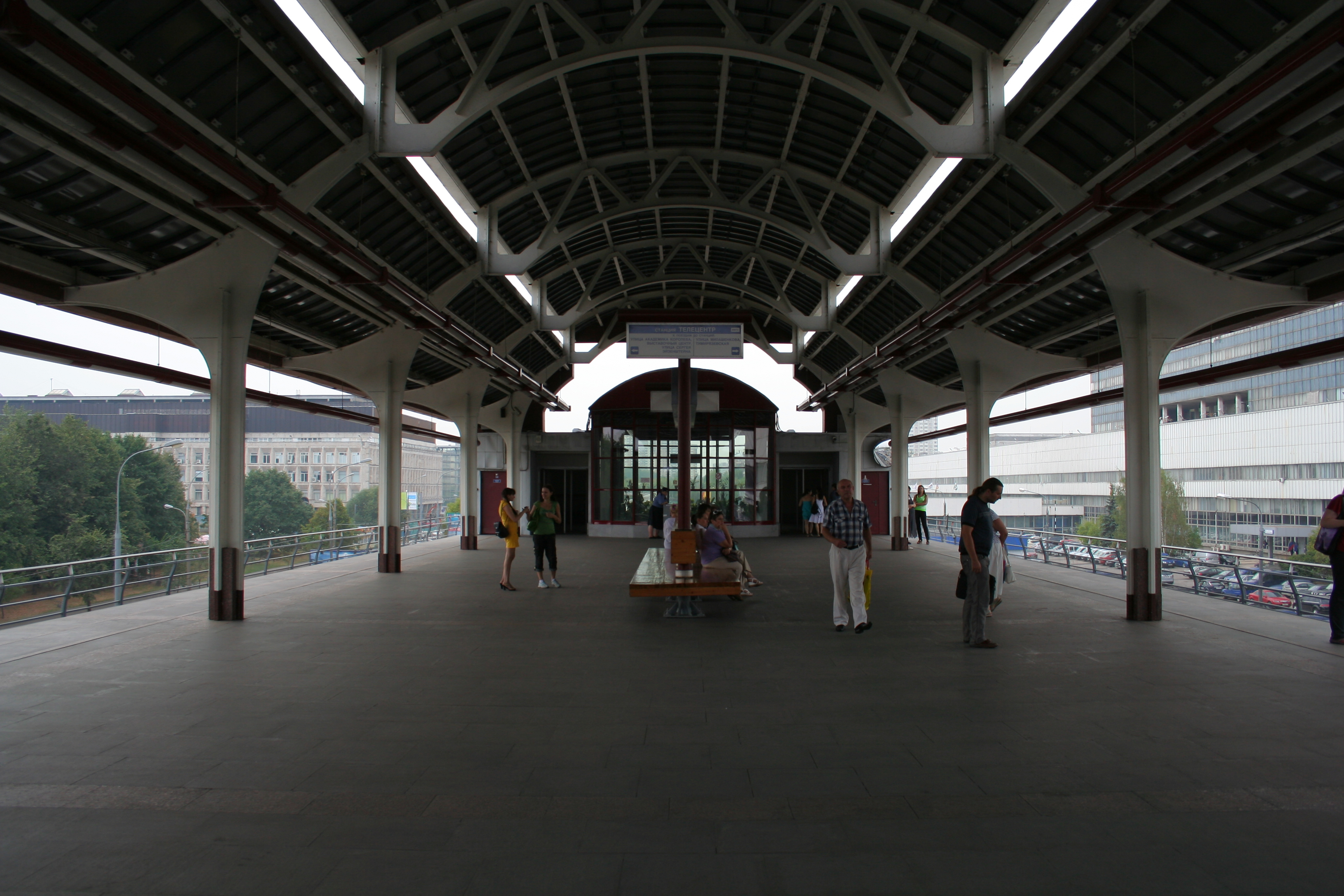

General information
- Location: Ostankinsky District; North-Eastern Administrative Okrug; Moscow; Russia
- Coordinates: 55.8218°N 37.6089°E
- Elevation: 6 metres (20 ft)
- System: Moscow Monorail station
- Owner: Moskovsky Metropoliten
- Line: #13 Moscow Monorail
- Platforms: 1
- Tracks: 2
- Connections: Railway: at Ostankino railway station Bus: 24, 85; Trolleybus: 9, 36, 37, 73

Construction
- Platform levels: 1
- Parking: No
- Accessible: Yes

Other information
- Station code: 202

History
- Opened: 20 November 2004 (exit only); 1 July 2005 (full service)
- Closed: 28 June 2025

Services
| Preceding station | Moscow Metro | Following station |
|---|---|---|
| Ulitsa Milashenkova towards Timiryazevskaya | Moscow Monorail | Ulitsa Akademika Korolyova towards Ulitsa Sergeya Eyzenshteyna |
Route map
Location

Teletsentr (Russian: Телецентр) was a station of the Moscow Monorail. It was located in the Ostankinsky District of the North-Eastern Administrative Okrug of Moscow. The station is called after the Ostankino Technical Center (Телецентр «Останкино») which is located nearby together with Ostankino Tower.

== History ==
The station was opened on 20 November 2004 along with other 4 stations of the monorail line (all but the southern terminus Timiryazevskaya which was opened 9 days later). It began operation in "excursion mode". Only two trains were operating at the line, the interval between trains was as long as 30 minutes and station hours were from 10:00 to 16:00. The passengers could only board the trains at Ulitsa Sergeya Eisensteina station. On 10 January 2008, the line began regular operation serving passengers 6:50 - 23:00 and allowing them board trains at any station of the line. Also the ticket price was reduced from 50 to 19 rubles.
