= Timiryazevskaya (Serpukhovsko-Timiryazevskaya line) =

Moscow Metro station

Timiryazevskaya Тимирязевская
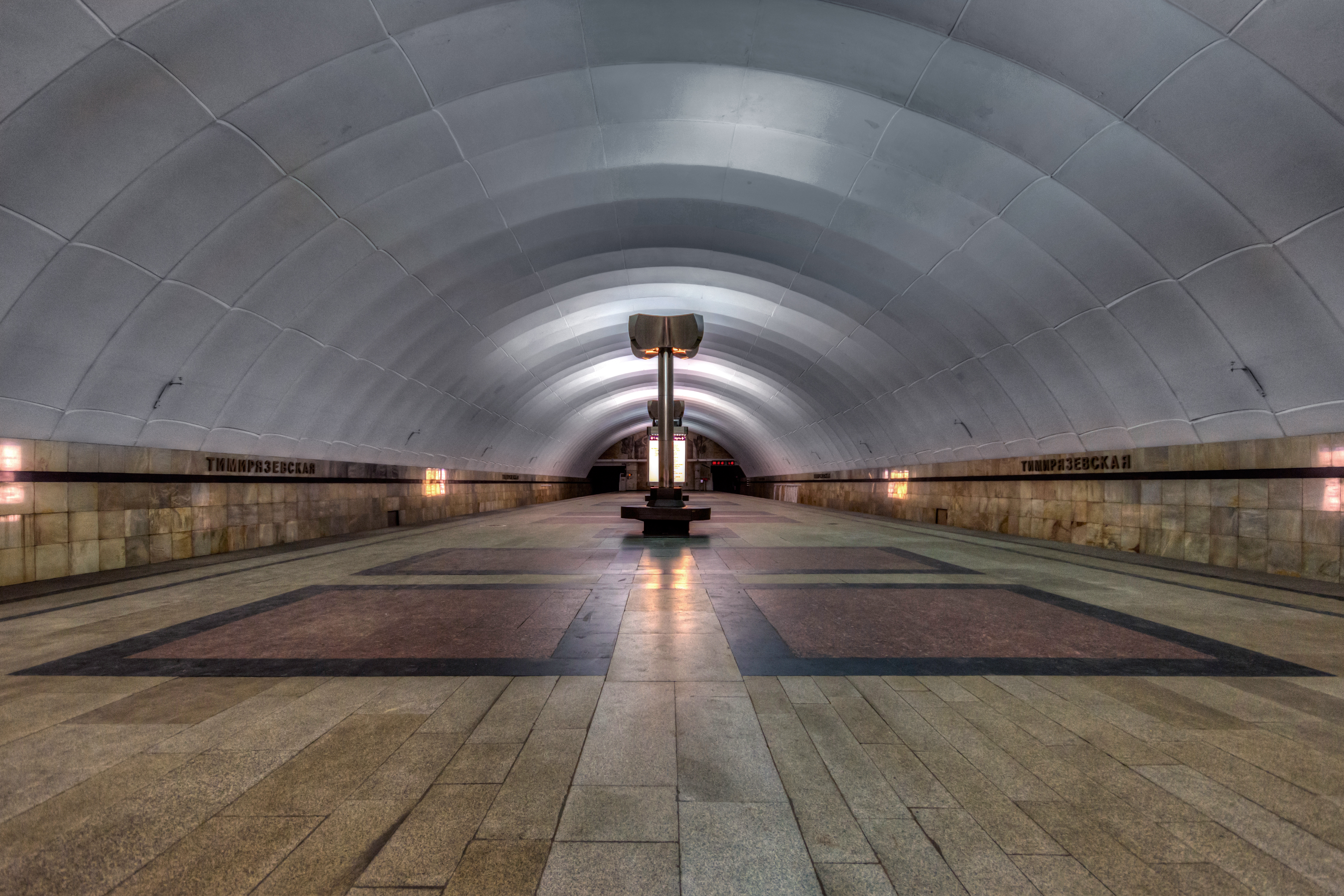

General information
- Location: Timiryazevsky District; Butyrsky District; North-Eastern Administrative Okrug; Northern Administrative Okrug; Moscow; Russia
- Coordinates: 55.8176°N 37.5765°E
- System: Moscow Metro station
- Owner: Moskovsky Metropoliten
- Line: Serpukhovsko-Timiryazevskaya line
- Platforms: 1 island platform
- Tracks: 2

Construction
- Structure type: deep level single-vault
- Depth: 63.5 metres (208 ft)
- Platform levels: 1
- Parking: No

Other information
- Station code: 134

History
- Opened: 1 March 1991; 35 years ago

Services
Preceding station	Moscow Metro	Following station
Petrovsko-Razumovskaya towards Altufyevo	Serpukhovsko-Timiryazevskaya line	Dmitrovskaya towards Bulvar Dmitriya Donskogo
Route map
Location
- Location within Moscow Metro

Timiryazevskaya (Russian: Тимиря́зевская) is a station on the Serpukhovsko–Timiryazevskaya line of the Moscow Metro, in Moscow, Russia, and is named after the neighboring Timiryazev Agricultural Academy. At 63.5 meters deep, it is the only deep level single-vault type station and the third deepest in the Moscow Metro, after Park Pobedy and Fonvizinskaya. It was opened on March 7, 1991, as a part of a major northern extension of the line and was the deepest station in Moscow Metro from 1991 until opening of Park Pobedy in 2003.

Timiryazevskaya has exits to Dmitrovskoye Highway and the Timiryazevskaya station of the Savyolovo railway. The station provides transfer to commuter trains serving destinations to the north of Moscow. The eponymous western terminus of the Moscow Monorail line was located near the entrance to the station until 2025. Daily passenger flow is about 60,000.
