= Maryina Roshcha (Lyublinsko-Dmitrovskaya line) =

Moscow Metro station

Maryina Roshcha Марьина роща
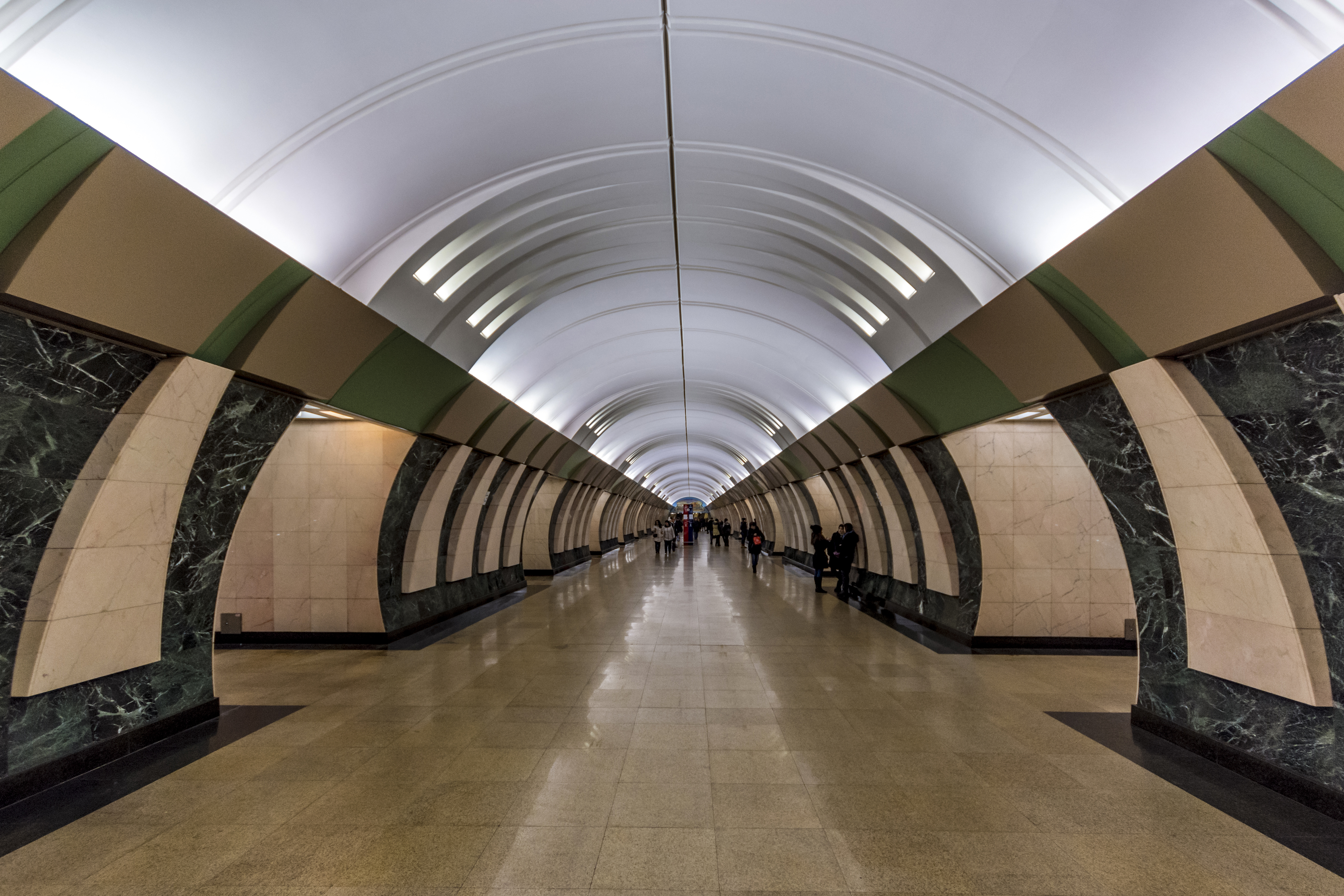

General information
- Location: Maryina Roshcha District; North-Eastern Administrative Okrug; Moscow; Russia
- Coordinates: 55.7954°N 37.6162°E
- System: Moscow Metro station
- Owner: Moskovsky Metropoliten
- Line: Lyublinsko-Dmitrovskaya line
- Platforms: 1 island platform
- Tracks: 2
- Connections: Railway: at Maryina Roshcha railway station Bus: 12, 19, 24, 84; Trolleybus: 13, 15, 18, 42, 69

Construction
- Structure type: Deep pylon triple-vault station
- Depth: 60 metres (200 ft)
- Platform levels: 1
- Parking: No

Other information
- Station code: 182

History
- Opened: 19 June 2010; 16 years ago

Services
| Preceding station | Moscow Metro | Following station |
|---|---|---|
| Butyrskaya towards Fiztekh | Lyublinsko-Dmitrovskaya line | Dostoevskaya towards Zyablikovo |
| Savyolovskaya anticlockwise / outer | Bolshaya Koltsevaya line transfer at Maryina Roshcha | Rizhskaya clockwise / inner |
Route map
Location
- Location within Moscow Metro

Maryina Roshcha (Russian: Марьина роща) is a Moscow Metro station of Lyublinsko-Dmitrovskaya line. It opened on 19 June 2010 and, until 2016, was the northern terminus of the line. The station is in the Maryina Roshcha District of Moscow, north of downtown.

The extension northwest to Petrovsko-Razumovskaya via Butyrskaya and Fonvizinskaya was originally planned to be opened in December 2015. The projected opening date was later shifted to 2016. The extension was finally opened on 16 September 2016.

By 2023, a transfer to the Bolshaya Koltsevaya line is planned to be completed, at eponymous station.
