= Butyrskaya (Moscow Metro) =

Moscow Metro station

Butyrskaya Бутырская
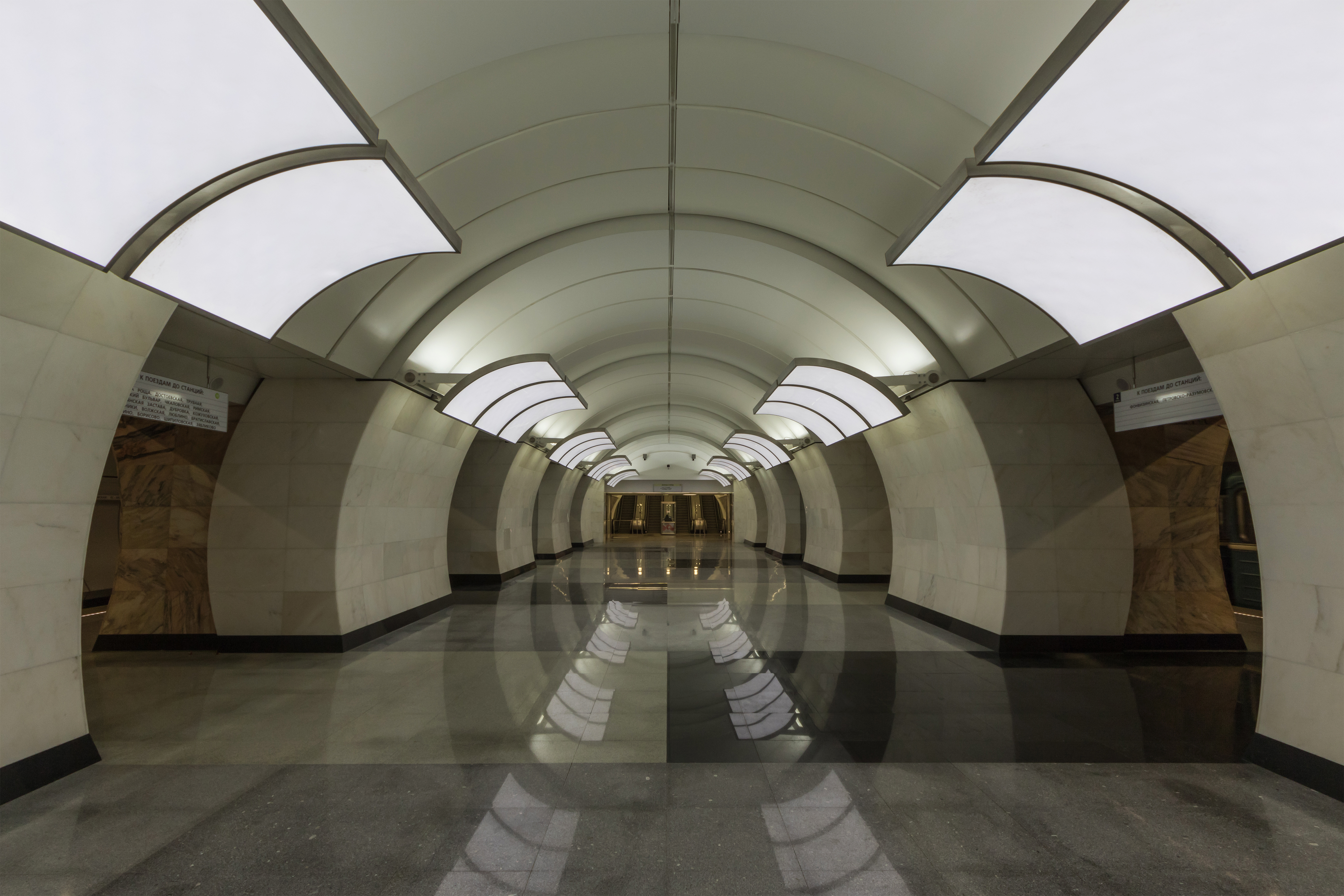
- Platform

General information
- Location: Butyrsky District; North-Eastern Administrative Okrug; Moscow; Russia
- Coordinates: 55.813577°N 37.602328°E
- System: Moscow Metro station
- Owner: Moskovsky Metropoliten
- Line: Lyublinsko-Dmitrovskaya line
- Platforms: 1 island platform
- Tracks: 2
- Connections: Railway: at Ostankino railway station

Construction
- Structure type: Underground
- Depth: 60 m (200 ft)
- Platform levels: 1
- Parking: No

History
- Opened: 16 September 2016; 9 years ago

Services
| Preceding station | Moscow Metro | Following station |
|---|---|---|
| Fonvizinskaya towards Fiztekh | Lyublinsko-Dmitrovskaya line | Maryina Roshcha towards Zyablikovo |
Route map
Location
- Location within Moscow Metro

Butyrskaya (Russian: Бутырская) is a Moscow Metro station of Lyublinsko-Dmitrovskaya line. It is located between Maryina Roshcha and Fonvizinskaya, at the intersection of Rustaveli Street and Ogorodny Proyezd, close to Ostankino railway station. It has one island platform. The name of the station derives from Butyrsky District and is thus related to the Butyrka prison and Butyrskaya Street.

The extension of the line from Maryina Roshcha northwest to Petrovsko-Razumovskaya via Butyrskaya and Fonvizinskaya was originally planned to be opened in December 2015. The projected opening date was later shifted to 2016. The station was opened on 16 September 2016.
