= Fonvizinskaya (Moscow Metro) =

Moscow Metro station

Fonvizinskaya Фонвизинская
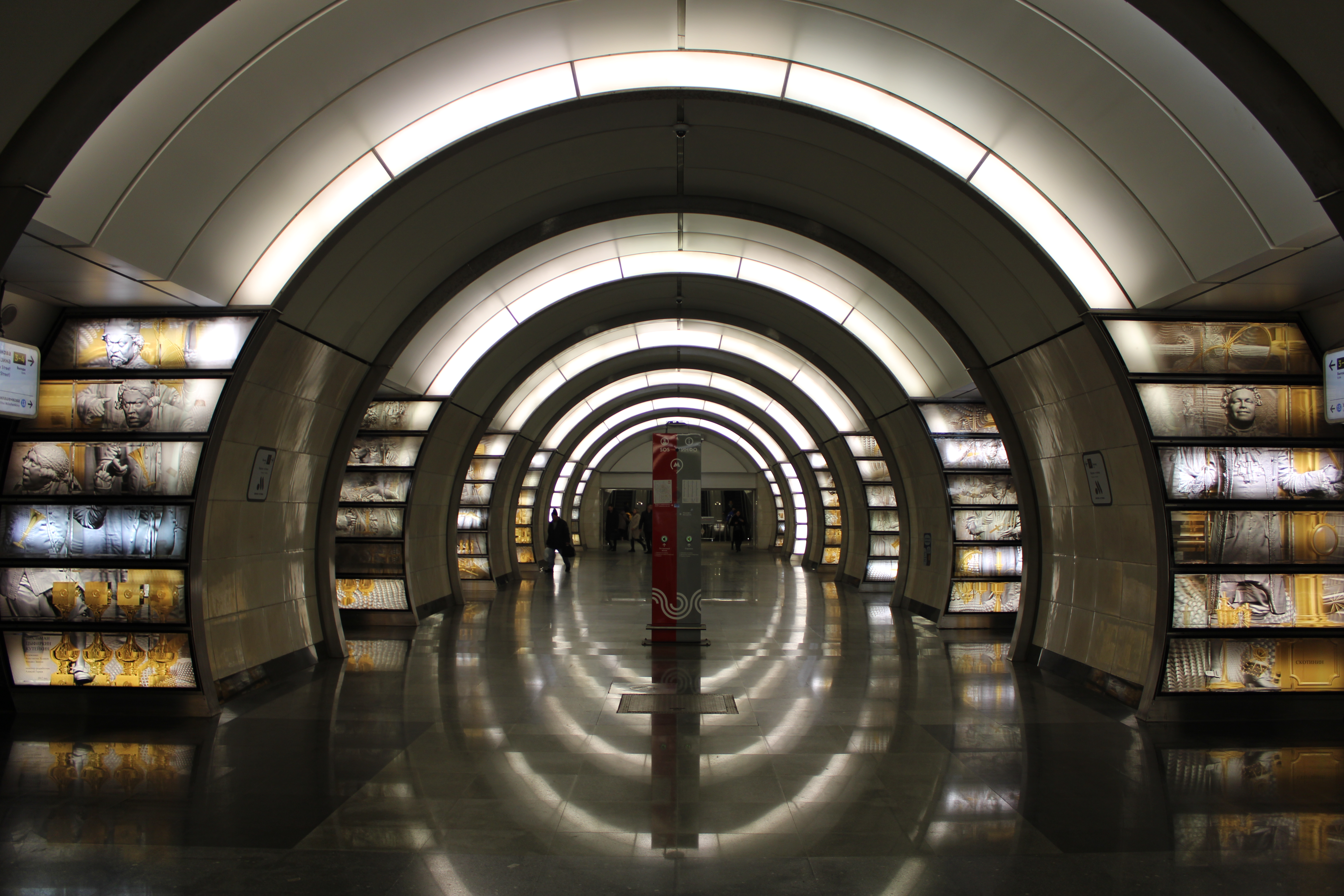

General information
- Location: Butyrsky District; North-Eastern Administrative Okrug
- Coordinates: 55.821512°N 37.589967°E
- System: Moscow Metro station
- Owner: Moskovsky Metropoliten
- Line: Lyublinsko-Dmitrovskaya line
- Platforms: 1 island platform
- Tracks: 2

Construction
- Depth: 60 metres (200 ft)
- Platform levels: 1
- Parking: No

History
- Opened: 16 September 2016; 9 years ago

Services
Preceding station	Moscow Metro	Following station
Petrovsko-Razumovskaya towards Fiztekh	Lyublinsko-Dmitrovskaya line	Butyrskaya towards Zyablikovo
Route map
Location
- Location within Moscow Metro

Fonvizinskaya (Russian: Фонвизинская) is a Moscow Metro station of Lyublinsko-Dmitrovskaya line. It is located between Butyrskaya and Petrovsko-Razumovskaya, at the intersection of Milashenkova Street with Fonvizina Street and Ogorodny Proyezd. It has one island platform. Ulitsa Milashenkova station of the Moscow Monorail was located close by until 2025. The name of the station derives from Fonvizina Street, which in turn was named after Denis Fonvizin, an 18th-century Russian playwright.

The extension of the line from Maryina Roshcha northwest to Petrovsko-Razumovskaya via Butyrskaya and Fonvizinskaya was originally planned to be opened in December 2015. The projected opening date was later shifted to 2016. The station was opened on 16 September 2016.
