= Vystavochny Tsentr =

Moscow Monorail station

Vystavochny Tsentr Выставочный центр
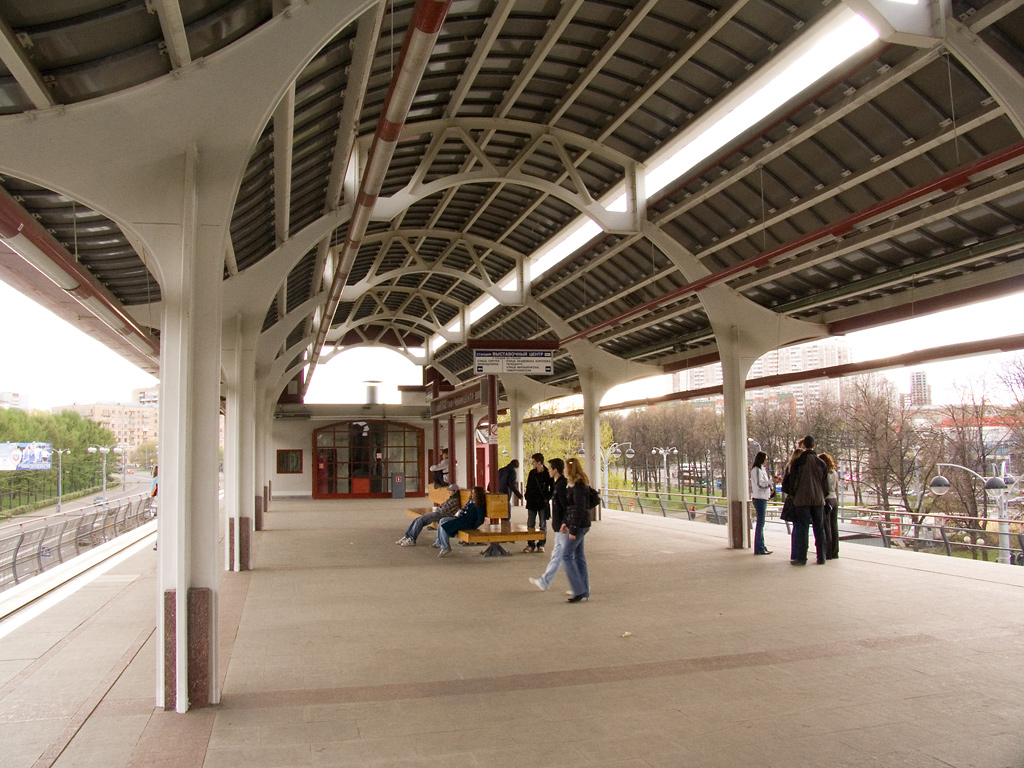

General information
- Location: Ostankinsky District; North-Eastern Administrative Okrug; Moscow; Russia
- Coordinates: 55.8240°N 37.6383°E
- Elevation: 6 metres (20 ft)
- System: Moscow Monorail station
- Owner: Moskovsky Metropoliten
- Line: #13 Moscow Monorail
- Platforms: 1
- Tracks: 2
- Connections: Metro: at VDNKh; Bus: м9, 15, 33, 56, 76, 85, 93, 136, 154, 172, 195, 244, 286, 375, 378, 379, 533, 544, 803, 834, 903, т13, т14, т76 Tram: 11, 17, 25

Construction
- Platform levels: 1
- Parking: No
- Accessible: Yes

Other information
- Station code: 204

History
- Opened: 20 November 2004 (exit only); 1 July 2005 (full service)
- Closed: 28 June 2025

Services
Preceding station	Moscow Metro	Following station
Ulitsa Akademika Korolyova towards Timiryazevskaya	Moscow Monorail	Ulitsa Sergeya Eyzenshteyna Terminus
Route map
Location

Vystavochny Tsentr (Russian: Выставочный центр, English: Exhibition Center) was a Moscow Monorail station in the Ostankinsky District, North-Eastern Administrative Okrug, Moscow, Russia. The station was situated near the main entrance of VDNKh, which was named the All-Russia Exhibition Center (Всероссийский выставочный центр) in 1992–2014, hence the station name.

== History ==
The station was opened on 20 November 2004 along with four stations of the monorail line (All but the southern terminus Timiryazevskaya which was opened nine days later). It began operation in "excursion mode". Only two trains were operating at the line, the interval between trains was as long as 30 minutes and station hours were from 10:00 to 16:00. The passengers could only board the trains at Ulitsa Sergeya Eisensteina station. On 10 January 2008 the line began regular operation serving passengers 6:50 - 23:00 and allowing them board trains at any station of the line. Also the ticket price was reduced from 50 to 19 rubles.

== General information ==
- The station opens at 06:50 and closes at 23:00.
