= Moscow Monorail =

Public transport line in Russia

Overview
- Owner: Moskovsky Metropoliten
- Locale: Moscow
- Termini: Timiryazevskaya (west); Ulitsa Sergeya Eyzenshteyna (east)
- Stations: 6

Service
- Type: Straddle-beam Monorail
- System: Moscow Metro
- Operator: Moskovsky Metropoliten
- Daily ridership: 16,000 (2014) <2,000 (early 2025)

History
- Opened: 20 November 2004 (excursion mode); 1 January 2008 (transportation mode)
- Closed: 27 June 2025

Technical
- Line length: 4.7 kilometres (2.9 mi)
- Character: Elevated
- Track gauge: Monorail
- Electrification: 600 V DC Third rail
- Operating speed: 60 km/h (37 mph)

The Moscow Monorail (Russian: Московский монорельс, pronounced [mɐˈskofskʲɪj mənɐˈrʲelʲs]) (Line 13) was a 4.7-kilometre-long (2.9 mi) monorail line located in the North-Eastern Administrative Okrug of Moscow, Russia. It ran from the Timiryazevskaya via Fonvisinskaya and VDNHa metro stations to Sergeya Eisensteina street. The monorail line had six stations. Planning of the monorail in Moscow started in 1998. This was a unique project for Russian companies, which did not have prior experience in building monorails. 6,335,510,000 Russian rubles (about US$240,000,000) were spent by the city of Moscow on the monorail construction.

On 20 November 2004, the monorail opened in "excursion mode." On 10 January 2008, the monorail's operation mode was changed to "transportation mode" with more frequent train service. Ticket prices were reduced from 50 rubles ($2.00) to 19 rubles ($0.80), which was the standard fare for Moscow's rapid transport at that time; as of 2012, ticket prices still matched the standard fare, but multi-ride passes could not be used between systems. In April 2012, one of Moscow's transport officials announced that he believed that the system should be closed down and dismantled in the future. However, on 3 October 2012, the vice mayor of Moscow said that the Moscow Monorail would not be closed because of lack of alternative public transportation and very busy highways in that particular part of the city.

Since 1 January 2013, all metro tickets have been valid for the monorail. Interchange from the Metro to the Monorail and vice versa is free for 90 minutes after entering the Metro or Monorail.

The Moscow Metro operated the monorail, which in 2016 officially became Line 13 of the network.

On 27 June 2025, it was closed and will be reconstructed into an elevated park by 2027.

== History ==
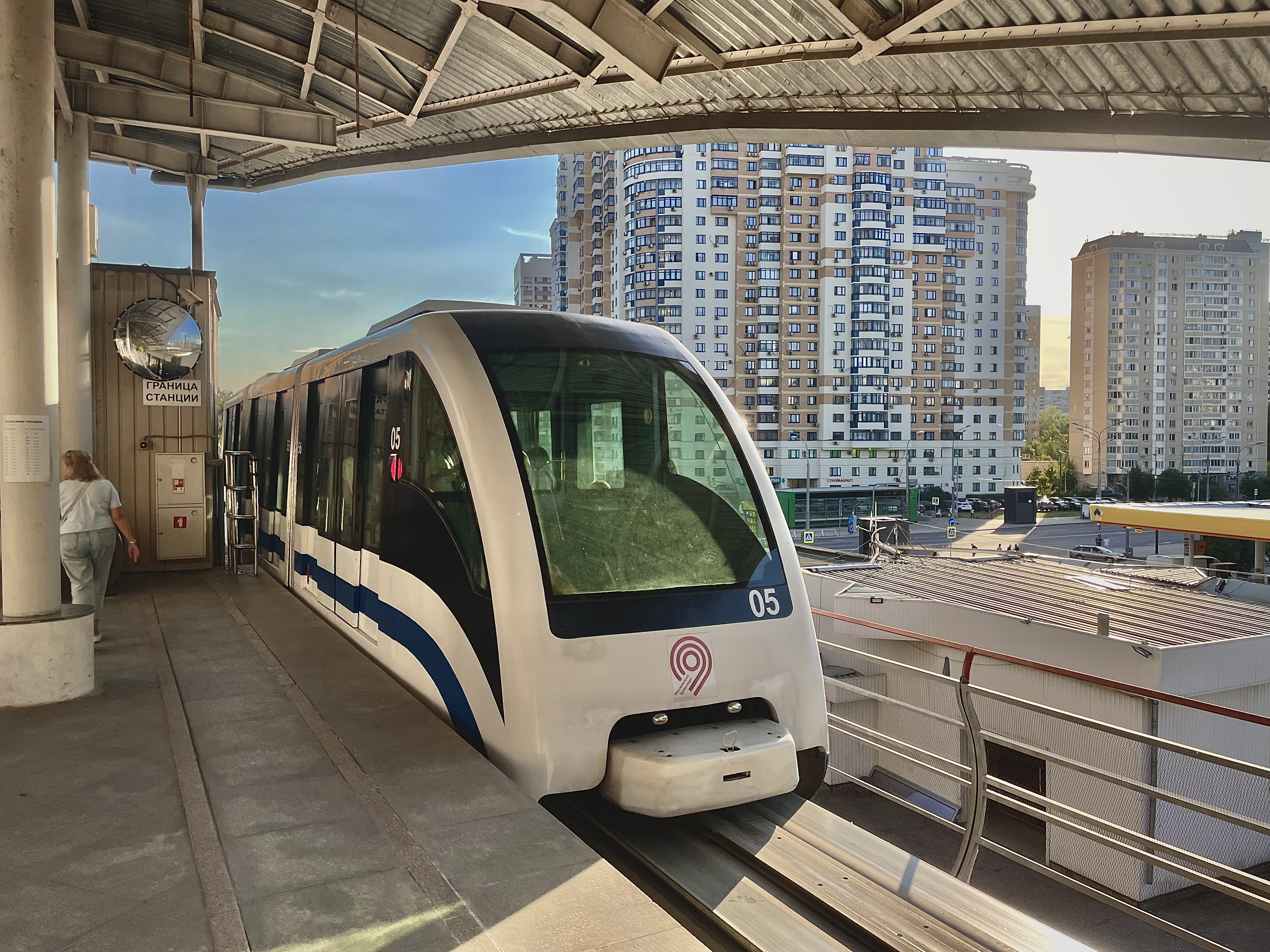
Moscow Monorail train at "Ulitsa Milashenkova" station

=== Planning ===
In the 1990s, Moscow's streets were suffering from traffic congestion by private cars, which significantly interfered with public transport. This situation renewed interest in the monorail which could unload ground public transport. Estimates were published in the media that showed that building monorails would be 5-7 times cheaper than building new underground metro lines.

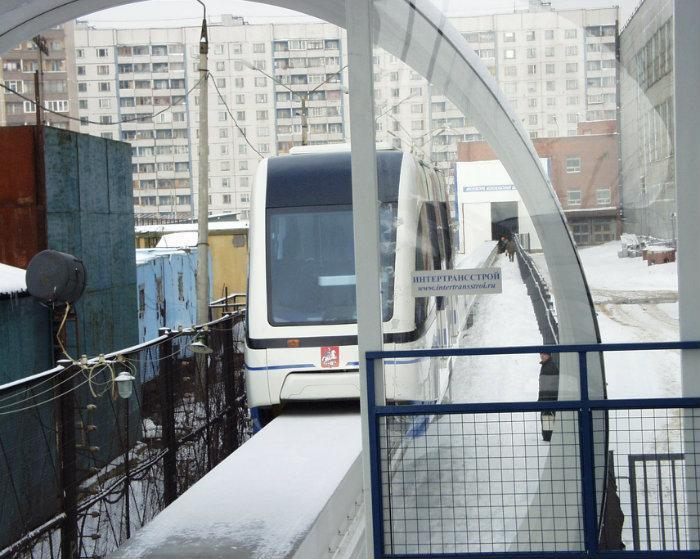
Experimental monorail railway in MITT

The decision to start monorail planning in Moscow was made by the Mayor of Moscow Yury Luzhkov after consultations with Yury Solomonov, the head of state-run Moscow Institute of Thermal Technology (MITT) and Luzhkov's close associate. (Luzhkov and Solomonov jointly patented 19 inventions, including patent RU 2180295 "Monorail transport system". In 1999, Solomonov directed Luzhkov's mayoral election campaign.) MITT previously developed military technology but had no prior experience in monorail design. At the end of the 1990s, MITT urgently needed funding and looked for contracts from the Government of Moscow.

On 17 July 1998, Luzhkov tasked MITT, the Office of Transport and Communications and Moskomarchitechtura (NIiPI General Plan of Moscow) to draft the Moscow Monorail program and to prepare a preliminary technological and economical justification for the development of monorail routes in Moscow. These tasks were formulated in a short decree 777-RP "On the financing of project works on monorail transportation". MITT received 1.4 million rubles from the Moscow city budget. Deputy Premier of Moscow Government B.V. Nikolsky was assigned to supervise the project.

On 2 September 1998, Luzhkov signed a decree 996-RP "On the design and construction of new types of high-speed transportation in Moscow" which justified the development of monorail lines in Moscow. The decree stated that traditional public transportation could not handle the increasing passenger loads and that cardinal solution to that problem would be possible only through the development of new types of high-speed transportation that meet modern ecological and economical requirements, are comfortable and could be integrated with traditional transportation. The decree instructed the Office of Transport and Communications and the state-run Moscow Institute of Thermal Engineering to continue work on the Moscow monorail transportation and to draft the layout of monorail lines by the first quarter of 1999. Luzhkov's decree proposed three monorail lines: from Novogireevo metro to Nikolo-Archangelskoe cemetery, from the metro Vykhino to Zhulebno district and from Krylatskoe to Krasnaya Presnya. However, these proposed lines were later canceled. Again, B.V. Nikolsky supervised the project.

On 16 February 1999, the decree 108-PP established an open joint-stock company Moscow Monorail. The company was co-founded by the Department of State and the municipal property of Moscow City which acted on behalf of the Government of Moscow and had a 25% + 1 share. The total starting capital of Moscow Monorail was 100 million rubles. Vladimir Grigorievich Sister, the prefect of the North-Eastern Administrative Okrug, represented the Government of Moscow in the company. General supervision over the decree implementation was conducted by B.V. Nikolsky. On 3 August 1999, Luzhkov's decree 738-RP established a commission for the supervision of the monorail works in the North-Eastern Administrative Okrug. Sister became the commission head.

By the first quarter of 2000, an experimental monorail test set was built at the MITT campus. Several trains were purchased from the Swiss company Intamin. The decree 49-PP specified the rules, regulations and parameters for the construction of the Moscow Monorail.

Geographical location of Moscow Monorail (navy blue line) with other metro lines and Central Circle indicated with black lines.

=== Design ===
The monorail had been planned to run from the M8 highway overpass to Severyanin railway station, but later the project was changed to connect two nearby metro stations (Timiryazevskaya and Botanichesky Sad) with the All-Russia Exhibition Centre. At that time, Moscow competed for hosting Expo 2010 and a modern monorail could improve the image of the exhibition site. This idea was finalized on 13 March 2001 in the Moscow Government decree 241-PP. On 21 June, tasks were assigned to the companies contracted to prepare the monorail project:

Task Assignments on Moscow Monorail Project
Contractor	Assignment
Open joint-stock company Moscow Monorails	Basic technical solutions of the first stage of the monorail, electric train construction
Limited liability company Selton-M	Dispatch control system
Federal unitary enterprise Semikhatov Scientific-Manufacturing Union of Automation	Electric traffic control system
Federal unitary enterprise Experimental Design Bureau Vympel	Railroad signs, parking devices, auxiliary equipment
Open joint-stock company Moscow Mechanical Engineering Plant Vympel	Major parts of the undercarriage of the train
Open joint-stock company Scientific-Manufacturing Enterprise Kvant	Development and installation of the train engine system
Federal unitary enterprise Research Institute of Tire Industry	Design and development of reinforced wheels R22.5 with an internal flange
Moscow Committee for Architecture and Urban Developmentn (Moskomarkhitektura), Open joint-stock company Transstroy Corporation, Mosinzhproekt Institute, MosgortransNIIproekt Institute, Mosgortrans	Monorail track, construction equipment, electric power supply

The development plan of the North-East Administrative Okrug prioritized the construction of the monorail linking metro stations Botanichesky Sad and Timiryazevskaya. This line was planned to be 8.6 km (5.3 mi) long and to have nine stations. On 25 December 2001, it was decided that the monorail construction would be accomplished in two stages. The first stage would be the construction of the route from the metro station Timiryazevskaya to the All-Russia Exhibition Centre. On 22 May 2001, the Government of Moscow announced that this line would open in the second quarter of 2003. The Government of Moscow also emphasized the uniqueness of the object and the lack of experience of Russian companies in such constructions. On 31 January 2002, it was decided that the monorail depot would be established at the territory of the Bauman tram depot where the Museum of Urban Passenger Transport had been located. To clear the space for the monorail subdivision of the depot, the museum exposition was first moved to a tram repair factory and then to a newly constructed building that opened in Strogino District on 10 September 1999.

=== Construction ===
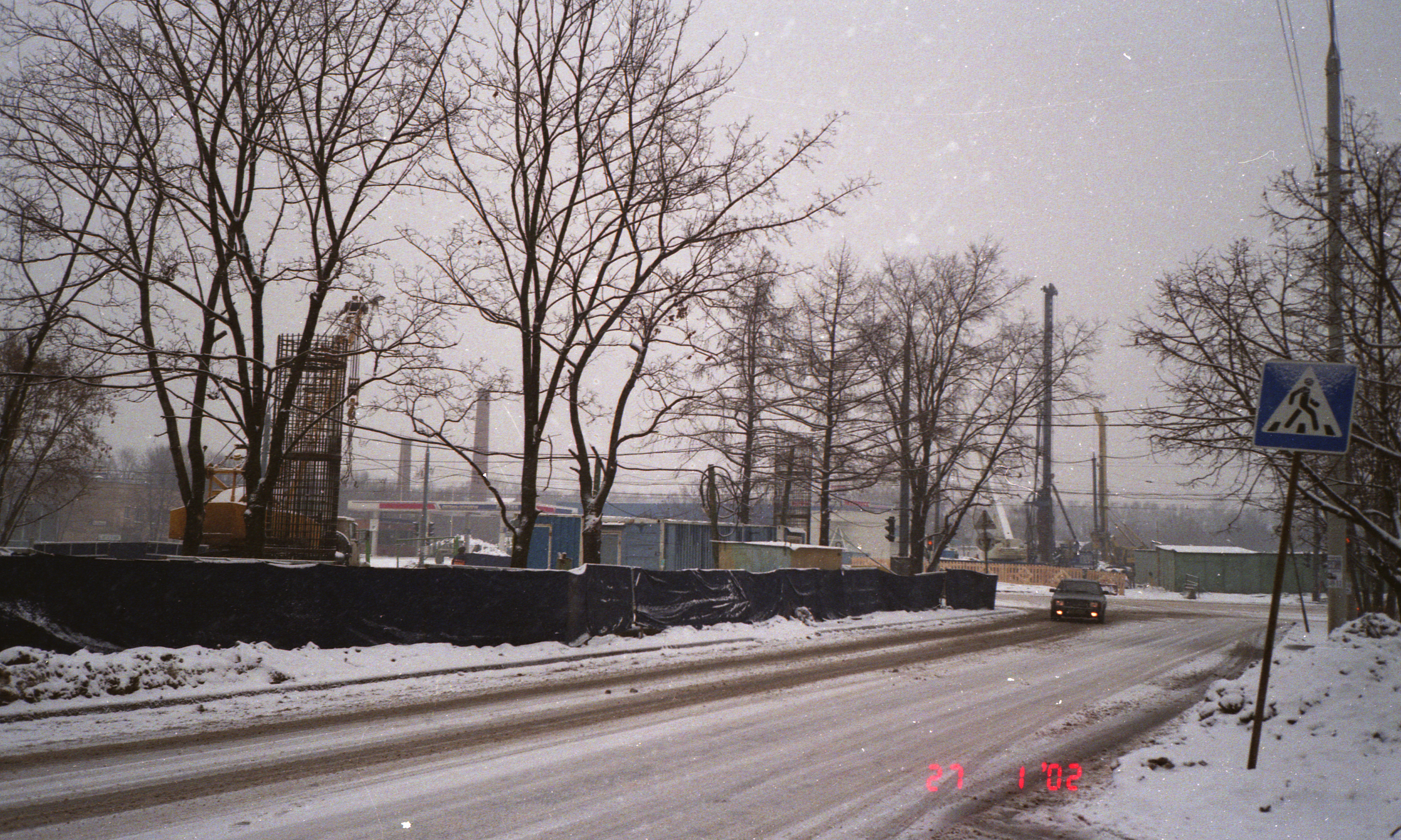
Construction of concrete poles (2002)

In August 2001, the construction began at Fonvizina street. The area was prepared for the construction, trees cut on the path of the future monorail and test drilling conducted. On 22 September, a prototype frame was built for the first pillar. At that time, the exposition trains were moved from the Bauman tram depot to the tram repair factory. On 2 February 2002, the tram track between VVTs and Ostankino was closed and a temporary one-way reversal circle was built for tram routes 11 and 17.

Monorail train design had to be refined because the trains acquired from Intamin showed unsatisfactory performance in winter conditions. The refinement consisted of the installation of a linear engine that was engineered by the scientific centre "TEMP" (electromagnetic passenger transport). The Moscow Government documents called the monorail line being built "experimental".

By the end of June, the construction of the monorail line over Academician Korolev Street' tramway was finished and the station construction began. The station was to be named Ulitsa Akademika Korolyova. On 15 October, tram service was restored on the route from All-Russia Exhibition Centre to the Ostankino TV center. In December, supports were installed throughout the route and the construction sites of all stations were defined. In April 2003, construction of Timiryazevskaya station began with the installation of support beams and building a rail switch.

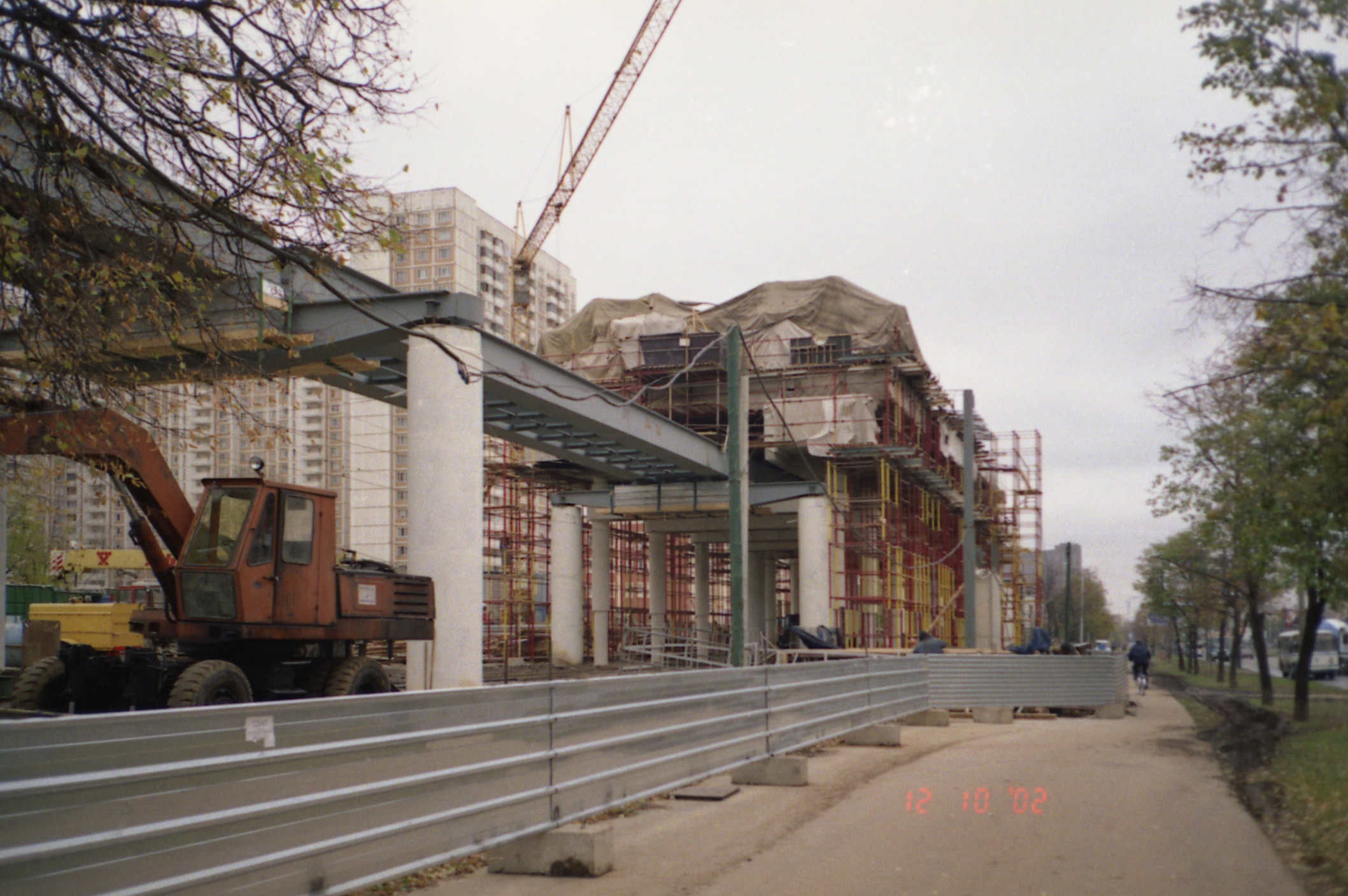
Concrete works on station Ulitsa Akademika Koroleva (2002)

The decree 866-PP issued by the Moscow Government on 14 October 2003 described in detail the procedure of launching the monorail and provided the technical parameters. The deadline of 24 October was set to form the acceptance committee. On 11 November, the name of the MMTS Expocentre terminal was changed to "Ulitsa Sergeya Eisensteina". On 21 November, special construction codes were established that restricted digging trenches, laying utilities, construction of building foundations, tunnelling works and other interferences in the strip of land adjacent to the monorail. The borders of this strip were demarcated as 25 metres (82 ft) from the monorail supports. Restrictions were also imposed on work that lowers the groundwater within 100 metres (330 ft) from the monorail.

In November 2003, most stations were nearing completion, and the rail construction was almost completed. In December, the first test runs of rolling stock were conducted.

The monorail opening had been planned for the beginning of February 2004, but was delayed until 23 February. On 19 February, an acceptance certificate for the monorail was signed by the committee. On 21 February, during a trial run near Ulitsa of the Academic Koroleva, one of the trains ripped off 15 metres (49 ft) of the third rail. Due to the accident, the monorail opening was delayed again.

On 20 April 2004, a decree "on the additional measures on the construction of the Moscow Monorail" 746-RP was issued. This decree rescheduled a number of construction deadlines from 2003 to 2004. In May, three trains were test run and the opening was delayed again for no given reason.

On 11 November, information surfaced that the only work that remained to be accomplished before the line could be launched in an excursion mode was the installation of the automated control system. On the same day, Dmitry Gayev, director of the Moscow Metro, presented the line to the media.

=== Excursion mode ===
On 20 November 2004, the monorail carried its first passengers. At that time the monorail was running two trains at 30-minute intervals while the only boarding and exiting station was Ulitsa Sergeya Eisensteina. The monorail ran from 10:00 to 16:00, by the suggestion of Moskovsky Metropoliten. On 29 November, Timiryazevskaya station was opened for boarding and exiting. The cost for one ride during the excursion period was 50 rubles for adults, 25 rubles for students (6 years of age or older) of universities, institutes and colleges and free rides for children under six years of age (later changed to seven).

At the beginning of 2005, a project for the continuation of the route was approved and the costs of that project were estimated. In July, the travel time from Timeryzevskaya to Ulitsa Sergei Eisensteina was cut down to about 22 minutes, the line's operating hours were extended to encompass 8:00 to 20:00 and the stations Vystavotchny Tsentr and Teletsentr were opened for passenger boarding and exiting. On 6 February, electrical equipment near Vystavochny Tsentr station caught fire, with no injuries. Based on previous experience, the monorail was closed until 11 February, due to concern of a possible high voltage leak near the accident area.

On 7 May and 1 June, two accidents involving damage of the third rail happened. Repair work in both cases took several days. It was decided to perform additional monorail reliability checks which suspended its opening until Q2 2006.

The last station was opened on 1 September 2006. On 19 and 20 October, the trial was conducted to assess the readiness of the line to have six trains en route simultaneously. According to the monorail staff, these trials showed the lack of sufficient reliability of the rolling stock. Because of this, the launch of the transportation mode is delayed to Q1 2007.

During the off-hours of 26 December 2006, approximately 400 metres (1,300 ft) of trolley cable was damaged between stations Vystavochny Tsentr and Ulitsa Sergeya Eisensteina. The damaged site was repaired quickly and, on 30 December, the line continued operation. Trolleys may have been damaged by an excavator or other heavy equipment. On 27 December, the repaired EPS 01 train was accepted for service and soon cannibalized for spare parts.

=== Budget complaints ===
In the beginning of 2007, Alexander Lebedev filed claims with the prosecutor of Moscow in regards to his beliefs that the government was making inefficient choices on budget matters in regards to the monorail. A deputy later published a large section of the complaint in a newspaper.

The period of time that the monorail was in excursion mode launched several complaints against the Moscow Government that were similar to Lebedev's. The highpoint of the complaints was on 20 August, when Dmitry Gayev, answering a question about expansion asked by journalists, said: "This line still does not have any expansion plans, but this does not mean we have to shut it down. This monorail is experimental in nature and is in an experimental regime. Monorails have the right to live, and anything on the territory of Moscow has the right to live, but there is no plan for expansion.". The media took this to mean that the experiment with the monorail had ended, and that there would be no more plans to develop rapid monorail transit systems in the capital.

=== Transition to transportation mode ===
In the first quarter of 2007, work was considered to be done on fixing minor problems encountered in the semi-automatic control system. Discussion about the transition began in December after the addition of bridges connecting the platforms at normal stations to ease emergency flow. Also in December, a certificate was signed stating that the current owners of the monorail would be willing to transfer ownership to the Moscow government.

=== Transportation mode ===
Stations opened for regular passenger service from 6:50 to 23:00 on 1 January 2008 and the line started working in transportation mode on 10 January. Transit time was 9 minutes to 22 minutes, with between two and five monorails simultaneously running. Crew sizes decreased to only the driver, the fare was ₽19 per trip and student tickets became available. The monorail carried 37,871 passengers in the first week of transportation mode, with daily use was of 5,700-6,200 passengers on weekdays and 7,000 on weekends. and reaching 12,000 per day by February. Daily monorail usage for 2008 averaged 9,600 passengers per day.

In November 2008, the maximum number of operating trains on the line increased 20% from 5 to 6, and a new schedule came into effect from 1 December.

Average daily usage in 2009 reached 11,200 passengers per day, reflecting a 17.3% increase from the previous year, and waiting times between trains that year fell by 20 seconds to 6:35 minutes. A round trip on the line was 39:40 minutes.

The Moscow City Government expanded in July 2008 the list of categories that entitled people to free use of the monorail services.

Flat fare rose in 2010 to ₽26, the same as the Moscow Metro's, and tickets subsequently became valid on each transport mode from 1 January 2013. Transfers from the metro to the monorail and vice versa are free for 90 minutes upon entering either one.

=== Return to excursion mode ===
Moscow Metro boss Dmitry Pegov stated in December 2016, that the monorail would "operate essentially in excursion mode" from 2017; intervals between trains would increase to 15 minutes in peak hours, and to 20–25 minutes at other times.

== Stations ==
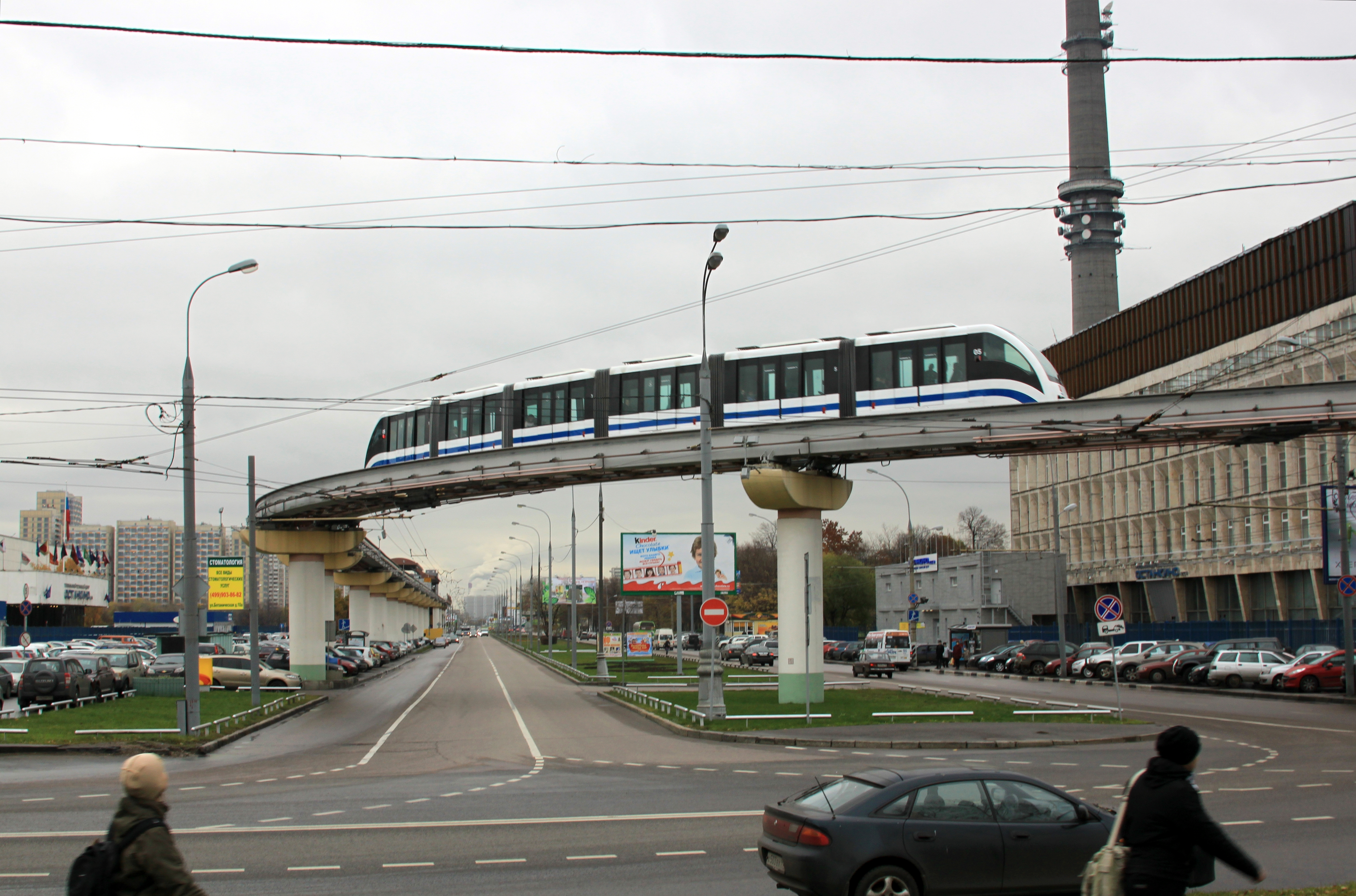
Akademika Korolyova street (2011)

Station Name		Transfers
English	Russian	Transfers
Ulitsa Sergeya Eyzenshteyna	Улица Сергея Эйзенштейна	
Vystavochny Tsentr	Выставочный центр	VDNKh
Ulitsa Akademika Korolyova	Улица Академика Королёва	
Teletsentr	Телецентр	Ostankino
Ulitsa Milashenkova	Улица Милашенкова	Fonvizinskaya
Timiryazevskaya	Тимирязевская	Timiryazevskaya; Timiryazevskaya

The monorail shared a unified station coding system with Moscow Metro.

The average travel time between Timiryazevskaya and Ulitsa Sergeya Eyzenshteyna stations was 17 minutes.

== Infrastructure ==
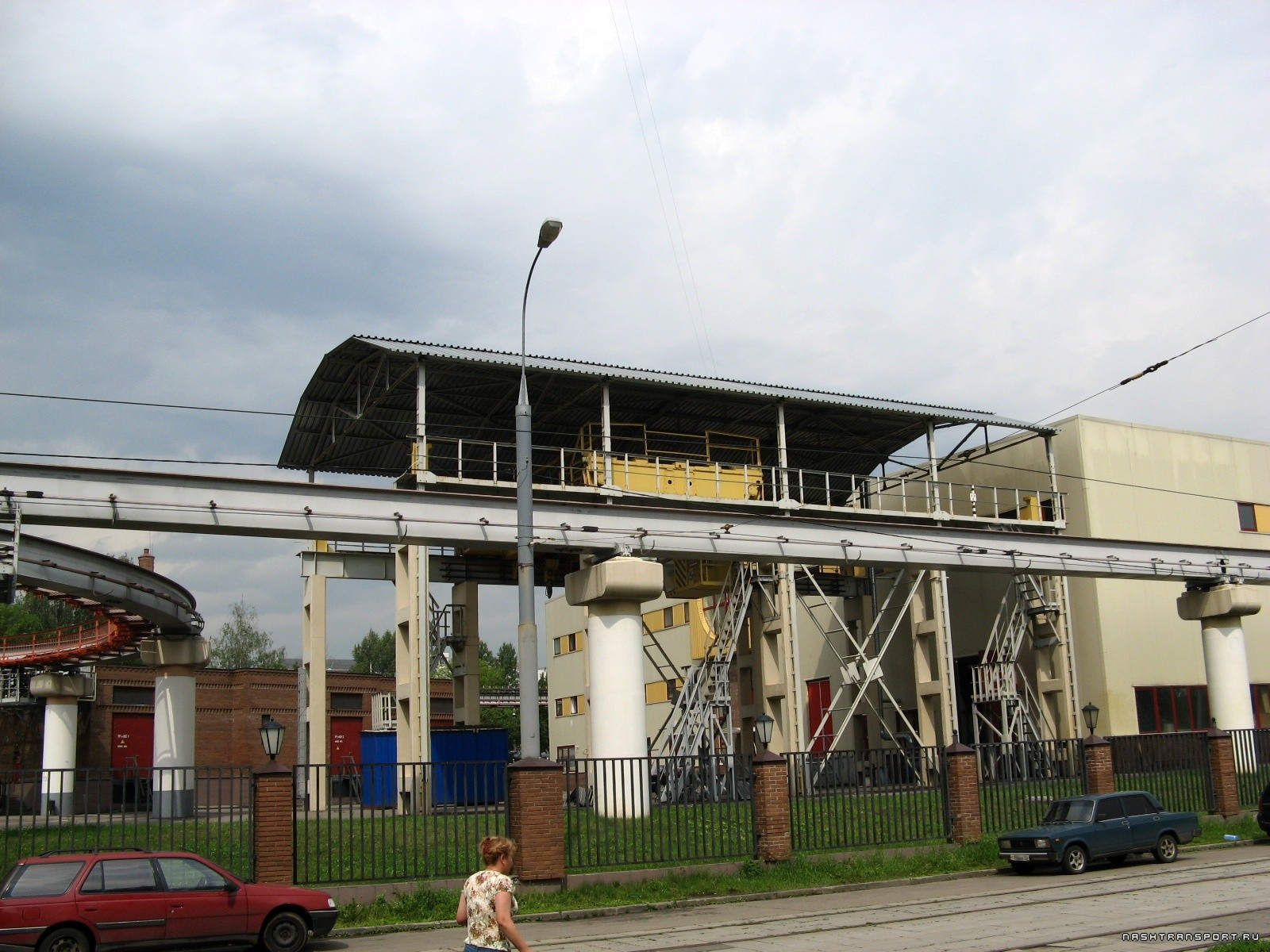
Rostokino depot

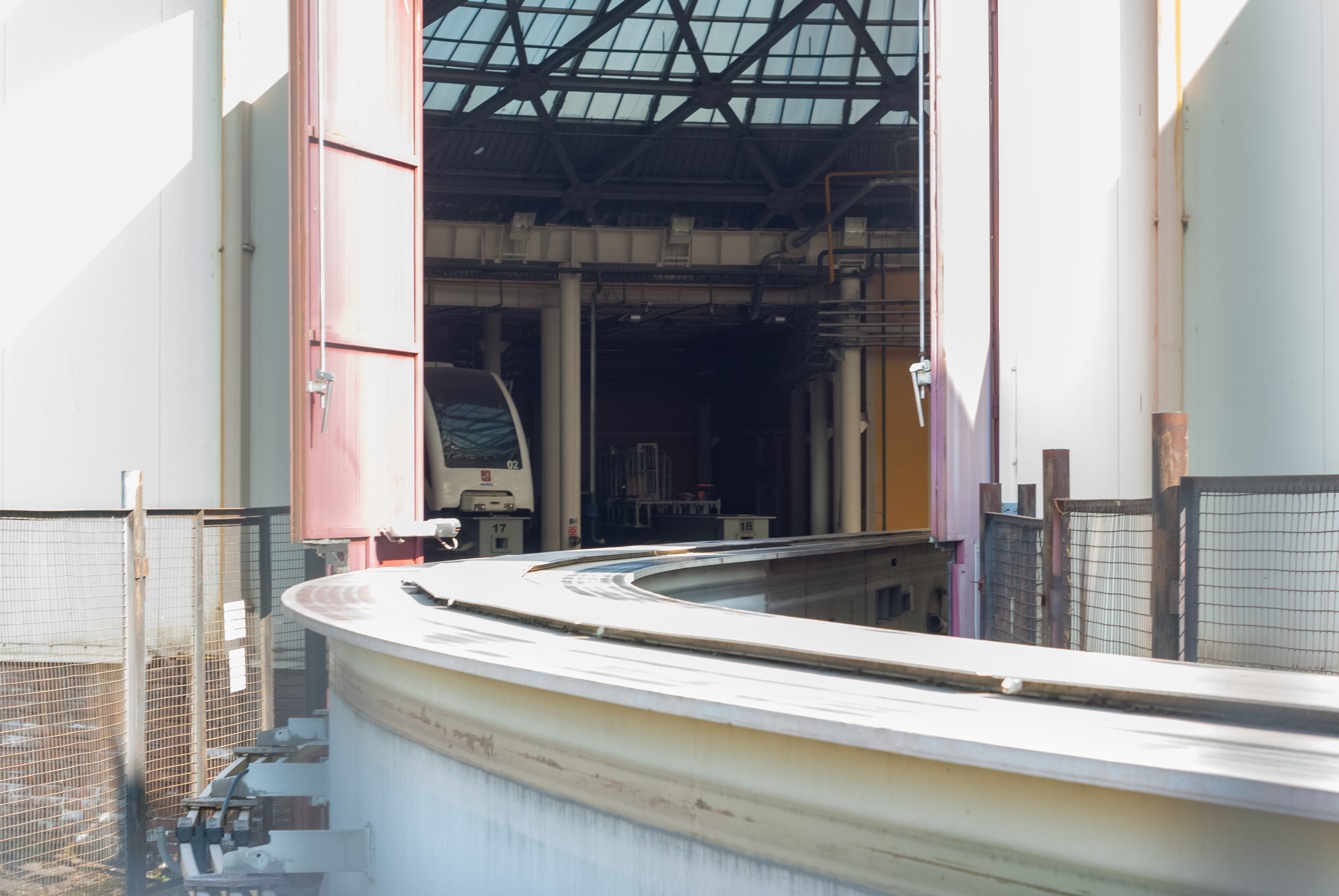
Depot turntable

Each station on the monorail was built separately. Each station consisted of two levels, with stair, escalator and elevator access between the two. Five of the six stations were built on an "island" principle, meaning that there was only one platform, with trains approaching on either side of the platform. However, Úlitsa Akadémika Korolyóva was built on a split island design. Instead of trains approaching from either side of one platform, there were two platforms, with trains approaching on only one side of each.

Management of the monorail line can be carried out automatically from the computer control room located in the Bauman train depot. Also at each station there are Station Dispatch rooms, so that rolling stock can be controlled remotely from the station. Currently, the monorail trains operate in a semiautomatic mode, where the electronic system controls the trains. There is also a manual mode in which the operator at the depot controls the trains. The monorail is powered by seven substations, one for each station and one for the depot.

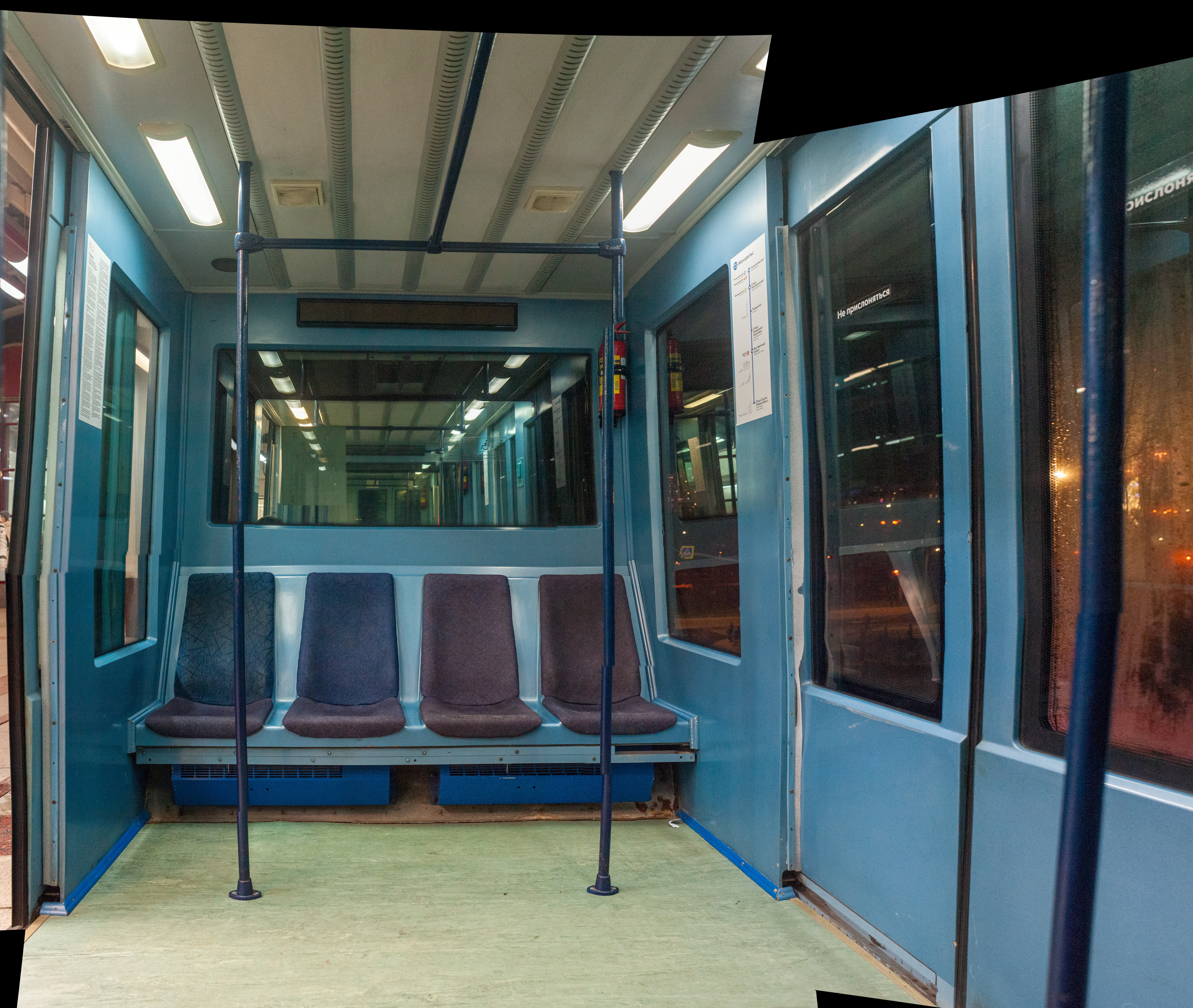
Monorail car interior

== Criticism ==
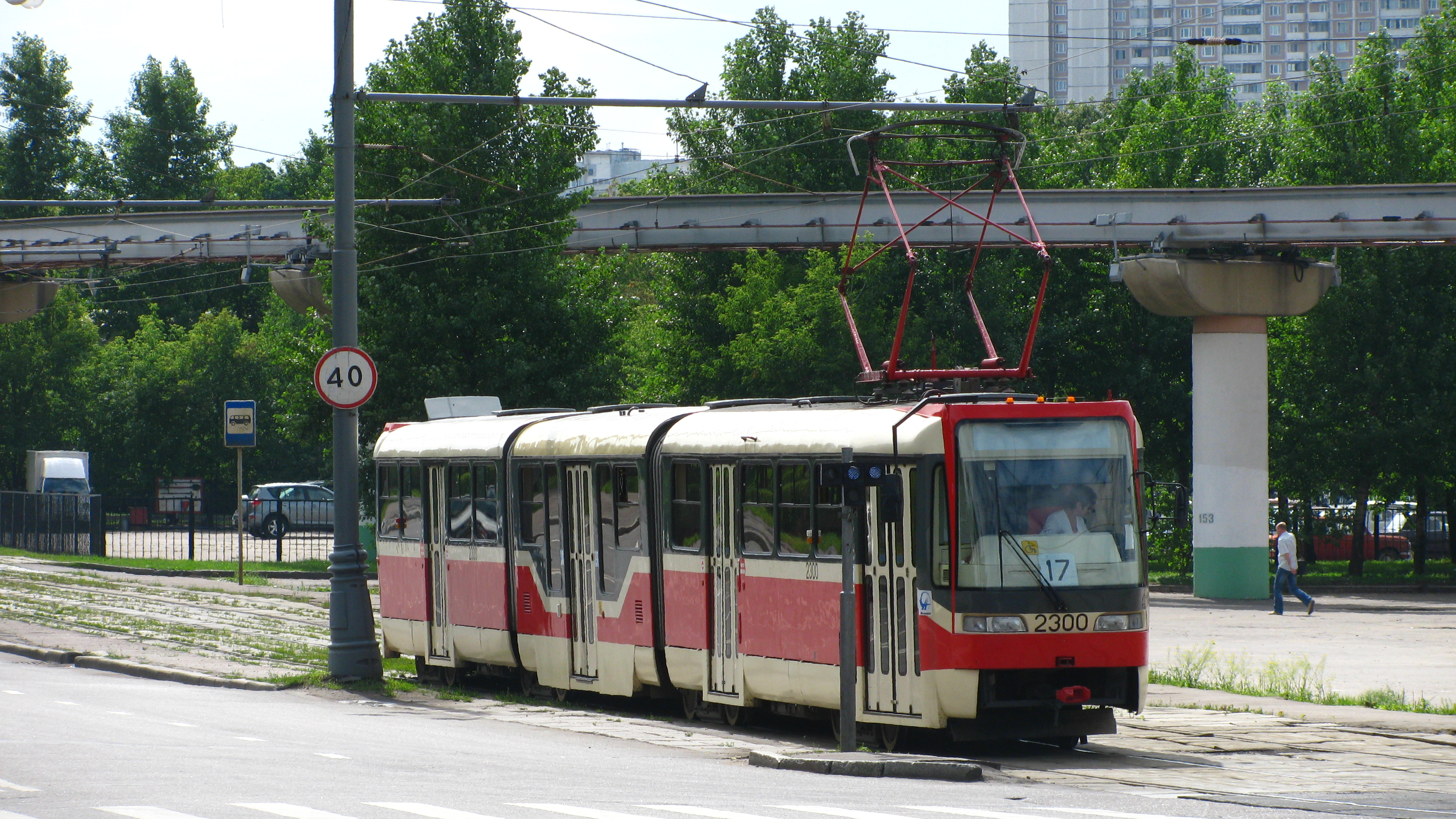
Tram line 17 passes under the monorail track near the VDNKh Moscow Metro station

The criticism in the media is primarily about the system design (low speed and capacity), the route of the monorail and the idea of elevated platform transport (it is alleged that a tram can have the same capacity and speed). For example, the journalist Alexandr Lebedev noted: The amount of space per person on the monorail (either 200 people with 5 people per meter squared or 290 people at an average of about 8 people per meter squared) has been criticized as too little space for something deemed an "alternative to the light metro". For example, journalist Elena Komarova wrote in 2006 that:

After the move from the excursion to working mode of the monorail, the running trains on the monorail should expand four fold, with trains going from 6 to 1 AM in intervals of five minutes carrying 3,500 people an hour... - (For comparison: Moscow trams are designed for about 15-20 thousand people per hour, the "light" metro can take up to 22 thousand an hour, the normal one, up to 80 thousand.)... For now, the monorail isn't raising prices in the area of construction, nor the capitalization of the entire city. Right now it is only eating budget money. It is a tiring toy.

However, the quote ignores the fact that the people per meter squared statistics listed above work out to about 50,000 people per day, which, taking into account the current capacity loads in the Moscow Metro, comes close to the hourly capacity loads of the Butovskaya Line. If the fact that the existing number of rolling stock held by the Monorail and dimensions of the rolling stock built for the first section of the depot is taken into account, such statistics do not match the potential of at least eight times, because (according to data on the company's website) trains can be made up of 10 cars (just like current Moscow Subway lines), and subway lines usually have 42-44 trains running per hour, which would satisfy the monorail's passenger traffic of 38 thousand people, per hour in both directions (or 23 thousand an hour under the existing six-car arrangement), which means the monorail can at least handle the same amount of traffic as the "Light Metro" and could possibly handle the daily volume of the Filyovskaya metro line.

Supporters of the project state that the current above-ground Moscow transport lines, along with the highways, are in very poor condition, and the construction of another Metro line would be too expensive and would lower the land values in the area where construction would be taking place due to the amount of noise.

=== Other problems ===
Along with financial problems, the closure of the Moscow Museum of Mass Transit for the construction of the monorail depot was criticized. The exhibits were moved into a tram repair station and are now not accessible to the public. Other residents complained about the change of the skyline after the construction of the Academica Koroleva Road station — they believe that the monorail track is not aesthetically pleasing and blocks the view across the street of the same name.

== Modernization and maglev proposal ==
In April 2022, Yuri Solomonov, a chief designer at the Moscow Institute of Thermal Technology, announced that the existing Moscow Monorail infrastructure could be adapted for maglev technology. According to Solomonov, relevant proposals had been submitted to the Mayor of Moscow, Sergey Sobyanin. An experimental maglev prototype was already operational at the institute's testing grounds. Previously, representatives of the institute stated that the maglev system could reduce energy consumption by approximately 30–40% compared to the existing monorail.

On 12 October 2023, the preparation of a concession agreement for the modernization of the Moscow Monorail was publicly announced. The agreement should have been signed by the end of the year. The modernization was expected to occur in two stages. The first stage (2023–2024) involved repair and restoration work on the existing rolling stock and a return to regular passenger service with five to six trains operating. The second stage (by 2027) should have included the design and production of new rolling stock featuring a magnetic unloading system and autonomous control. The rolling stock from the first stage should have been completely replaced with the newly developed trains. This agreement was never signed.

== Closure and conversion ==
A Moscow City government official stated in 2012 that the entire monorail would likely be closed and dismantled as it was unprofitable and did not perform to expectations. The same official also cited the monorail's poor design as another reason behind the closure plans.

A 10 September 2015 article in Russian press stated that there are plans to shorten the monorail by almost half to 3 kilometres (1.9 mi), from its current 5 kilometres (3.1 mi), by demolishing the section from Ostankino to Rostokino depot. The monorail's remaining, 3-kilometre (1.9 mi) section is to subsequently undergo renovation and made accessible, while a tram line will replace the demolished section.

Other reports in September 2015 stated, however, that it was not clear if the Moscow city government would close only part of the monorail or completely shutter it.

Moscow city officials announced in May 2017 plans to shut down the monorail and replace with tram service. Plans stipulate dismantling part of its elevated structure starting in 2018, and converting the standing remainder to handle tram tracks.

By the end of 2018 Moscows government stated that monorail will not be shut down.

By August 2020, reports of imminent closure were again circulating.

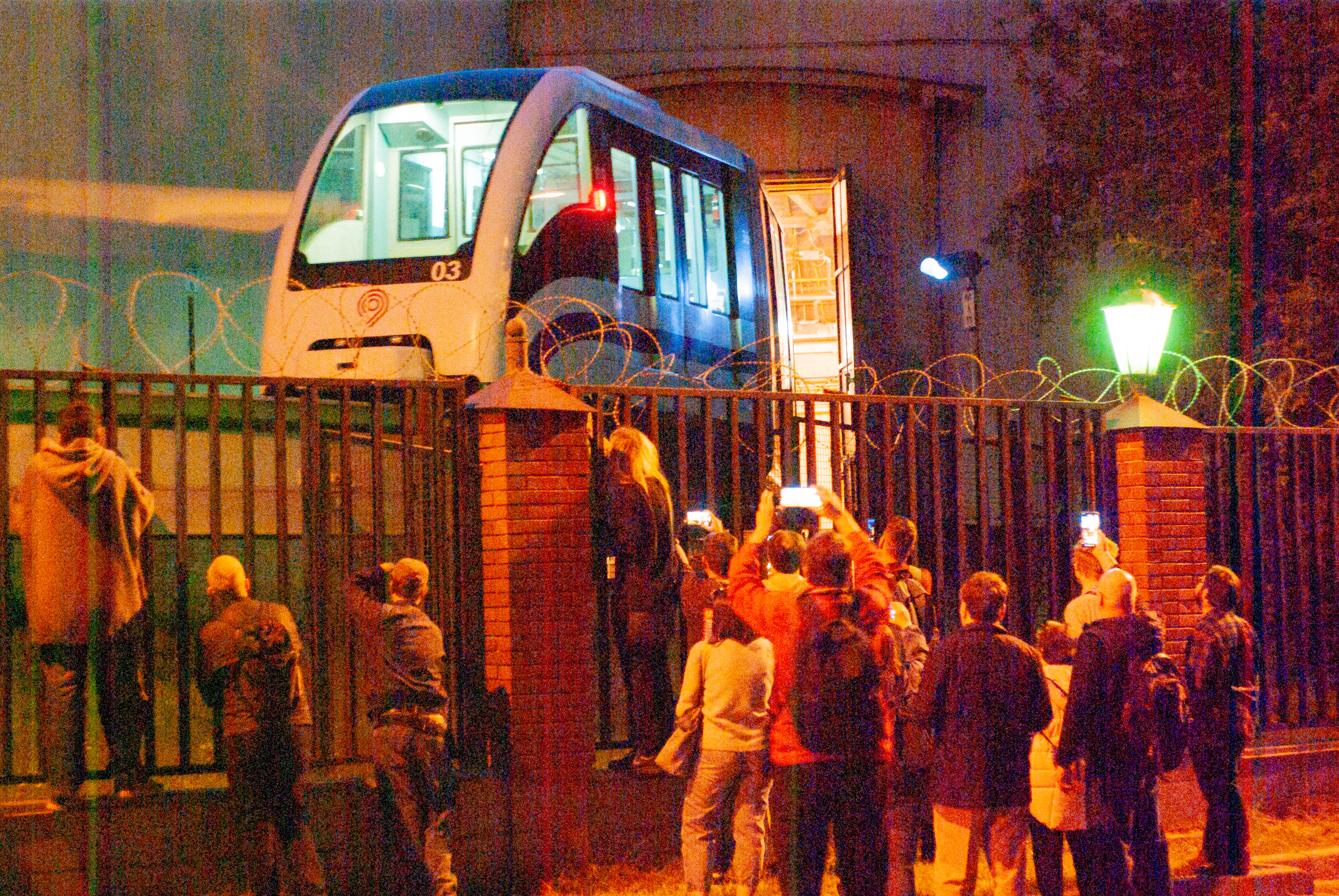
Last monorail train in depot at end of closing service

During an online referendum in June 2025, 71.14 % voted in favor of closure and converting the monorail track into a park, similar to the High Line. The last services operated on the evening of 27 June 2025.

== See also ==
- List of monorail systems
- Trams in Moscow
- Gadgetbahn
