= Timiryazevskaya (Monorail) =

Moscow Monorail station

Timiryazevskaya Тимирязевская
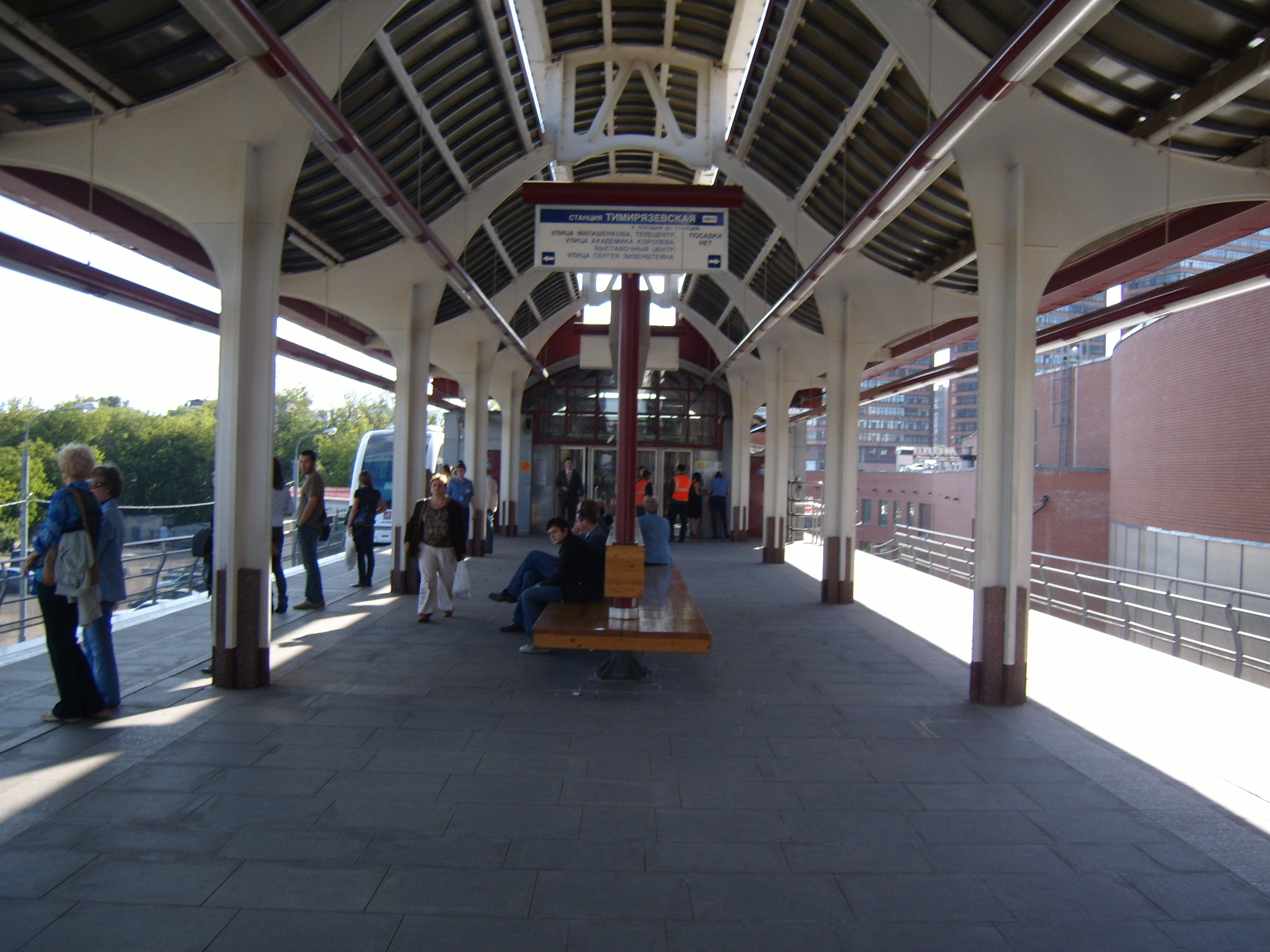
- Timiryazevskaya's island platform.

General information
- Location: Timiryazevsky District; Butyrsky District; Northern Administrative Okrug; North-Eastern Administrative Okrug; Moscow; Russia
- Coordinates: 55.8190°N 37.5789°E
- Elevation: 6 metres (20 ft)
- System: Moscow Monorail station
- Owner: Moskovsky Metropoliten
- Line: #13 Moscow Monorail
- Platforms: 1 island platform
- Tracks: 2
- Connections: Metro: at Timiryazevskaya; Railway: Savyolovsky suburban railway line at Timiryazevskaya; Bus: 12, 12к, 19, 23, 604

Construction
- Structure type: Elevated
- Platform levels: 1
- Parking: No
- Accessible: Yes

Other information
- Station code: 200

History
- Opened: 20 November 2004 (exit only); 29 November 2004 (full service)
- Closed: 28 June 2025

Services
Preceding station	Moscow Metro	Following station
Terminus	Moscow Monorail	Ulitsa Milashenkova towards Ulitsa Sergeya Eyzenshteyna
Petrovsko-Razumovskaya towards Altufyevo	Serpukhovsko-Timiryazevskaya line transfer at Timiryazevskaya	Dmitrovskaya towards Bulvar Dmitriya Donskogo
Route map
Location

Timiryazevskaya (Russian: Тимирязевская) was the western terminus of the Moscow Monorail. It was located in the Butyrsky District of the North-Eastern Administrative Okrug of Moscow, 50 metres (160 ft) away from Moscow Metro station Timiryazevskaya.

== History ==
The station was opened on November 20, 2004, for exiting and 9 days later for entering. It began operation in "excursion mode". Only two trains were operating at the line, the interval between trains was as long as 30 minutes and station hours were from 10:00 to 16:00. The passengers could only board the trains at Ulitsa Sergeya Eisensteina station.

On 10 January 2008 the line began regular operation serving passengers 06:50–23:00 and allowing them board trains at any station of the line. Also the ticket price was reduced from 50 to 19 rubles. Industry reports described this as the transition from a tourist attraction to regular passenger service.
