= Petrovsko-Razumovskaya (Moscow Metro) =

Moscow Metro station

Petrovsko-Razumovskaya Петровско-Разумовская
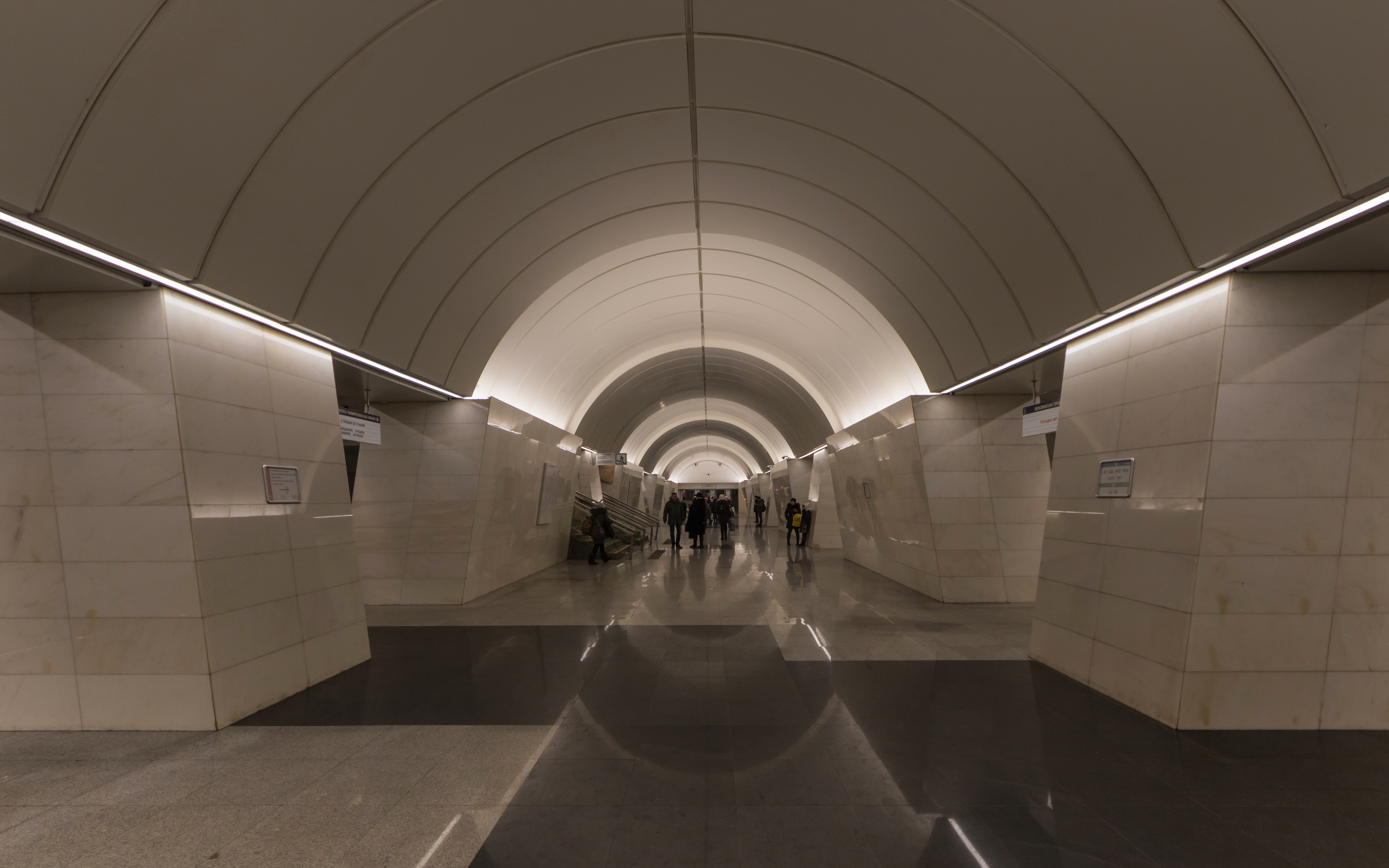

General information
- Location: Dmitrovskoye Highway; Timiryazevsky District; Northern Administrative Okrug; Moscow; Russia
- Coordinates: 55.8351°N 37.5745°E
- System: Moscow Metro station
- Owner: Moscow metropoliten
- Lines: Serpukhovsko-Timiryazevskaya line Lyublinsko-Dmitrovskaya line
- Platforms: 2 island platforms
- Tracks: 4
- Connections: Bus: 63, 82, 114, 123, 149, 167, 170, 179, 191, 194, 204, 206к, 215, 215к, 282, 461, 466, 656, 672, 677, 692, 763, 763к, 994, м10, м10к, Т47. Trolleybus: 56, 78.

Construction
- Structure type: Deep column triple-span
- Depth: 61 metres (200 ft)
- Platform levels: 1
- Parking: No

Other information
- Station code: 133

History
- Opened: 1 March 1991; 35 years ago
- Rebuilt: Two extra tracks opened 16 September 2016

Services
Preceding station	Moscow Metro	Following station
Vladykino towards Altufyevo	Serpukhovsko-Timiryazevskaya line	Timiryazevskaya towards Bulvar Dmitriya Donskogo
Okruzhnaya towards Fiztekh	Lyublinsko-Dmitrovskaya line	Fonvizinskaya towards Zyablikovo
Route map
Serpukhovsko-Timiryazevskaya line
Lyublinsko-Dmitrovskaya line
Location
- Location within Moscow Metro

Petrovsko-Razumovskaya (Russian: Петровско-Разумовская) is a Moscow Metro station in Timiryazevsky District of the Northern Administrative Okrug of Moscow. The station opened on 7 March 1991 as a part of a major northern extension of the Serpukhovsko-Timiryazevskaya line; the Lyublinsko-Dmitrovskaya line was extended to terminate there on 16 September 2016.

Petrovsko-Razumovskaya has exits to Dmitrovskoye Highway and also provides transfer to a commuter station of the same name on Leningradsky suburban railway line, which serves destinations to the north-west of Moscow. The daily passenger flow is about 80,000.

On the Serpukhovsko-Timiryazevskaya line, the station is between Vladykino and Timiryazevskaya stations. On the Lyublinsko–Dmitrovskaya Line, the station is between Okruzhnaya and Fonvizinskaya stations. The extension of the Lyublinsko–Dmitrovskaya Line to the north to Seligerskaya is operational and opened on 22 March 2018. The next station of the Okruzhnaya.

The 2016 extension of the station involved building a second hall and two extra tracks. The alignment allows cross-platform interchange between the two lines.
