= Ulitsa Sergeya Eyzenshteyna =

Moscow Monorail station

Ulitsa Sergeya Eyzensteyna Улица Сергея Эйзенштейна
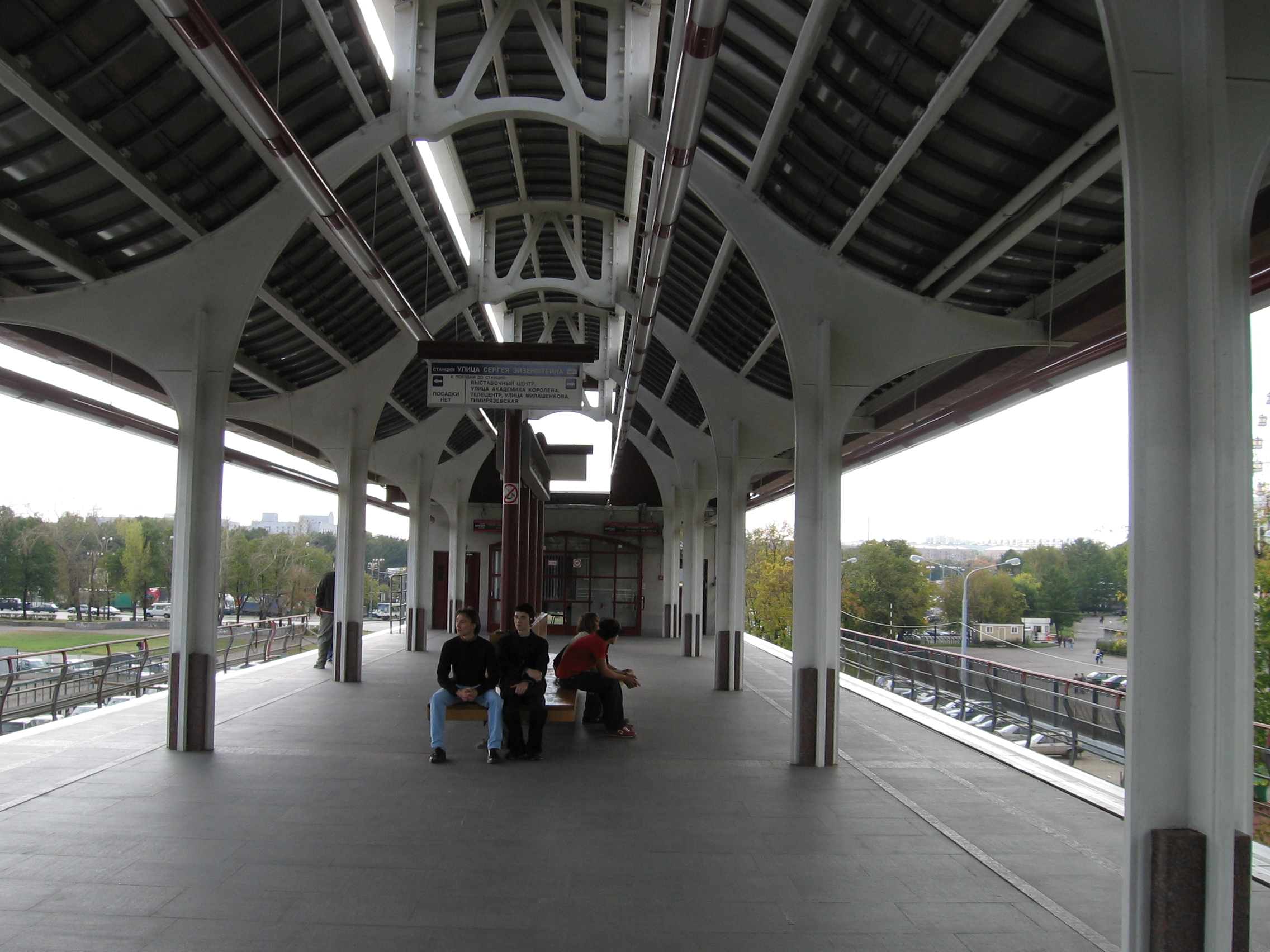

General information
- Location: Ostankinsky District; North-Eastern Administrative Okrug; Moscow; Russia
- Coordinates: 55.8292°N 37.6449°E
- Elevation: 6 metres (20 ft)
- System: Moscow Monorail station
- Owner: Moskovsky Metropoliten
- Line: #13 Moscow Monorail
- Platforms: 1
- Tracks: 2
- Connections: Bus: 154; Trolleybus: 48

Construction
- Platform levels: 1
- Parking: No
- Accessible: Yes

Other information
- Station code: 199

History
- Opened: 20 November 2004
- Closed: 28 June 2025

Services
Preceding station	Moscow Metro	Following station
Vystavochny Tsentr towards Timiryazevskaya	Moscow Monorail	Terminus
Route map
Location

Ulitsa Sergeya Eyzensteyna (Russian: Улица Сергея Эйзенштейна, English: Sergei Eisenstein Street) was the eastern terminus of the Moscow Monorail. It was located in the Ostankinsky District of the North-Eastern Administrative Okrug of Moscow.

== History ==
The station was opened on 20 November 2004 along with other 4 stations of the monorail line (All but the southern terminus Timiryazevskaya which was opened 9 days later). It began operation in "excursion mode". Only two trains were operating at the line, the interval between trains was as long as 30 minutes and station hours were from 10:00 to 16:00. The passengers could only board the trains at Ulitsa Sergeya Eisensteina station. On 10 January 2008 the line began regular operation serving passengers 6:50 - 23:00 and allowing them board trains at any station of the line. Also the ticket price was reduced from 50 to 19 rubles.

== Exits ==
The station featured two exits to Sergeya Eisensteina Street and the 1s Selskokhozyaistvenny proezd. The combined bus and trolleybus stop for lines 154 and 48 respectively and pavilions 69 and 70 of All-Russian Exhibition Centre was located nearby.

== General information ==
- Station code is 199.
- The station opens at 06:50 and closes at 23:00.
