= Butyrsky District =

Butyrsky District Бутырский район (Russian)
- District
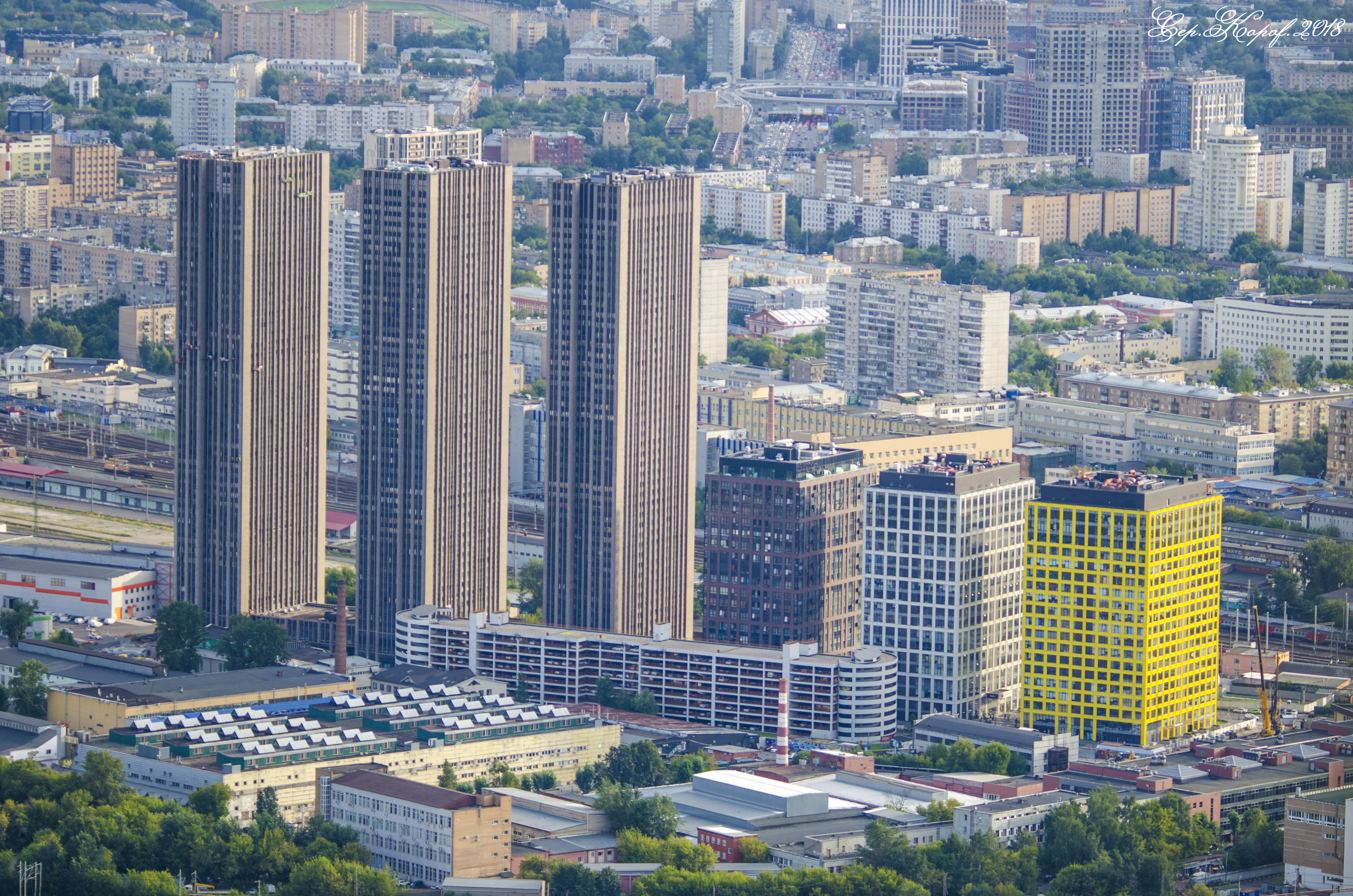
- Savyolovskiy City business center and apartment complex

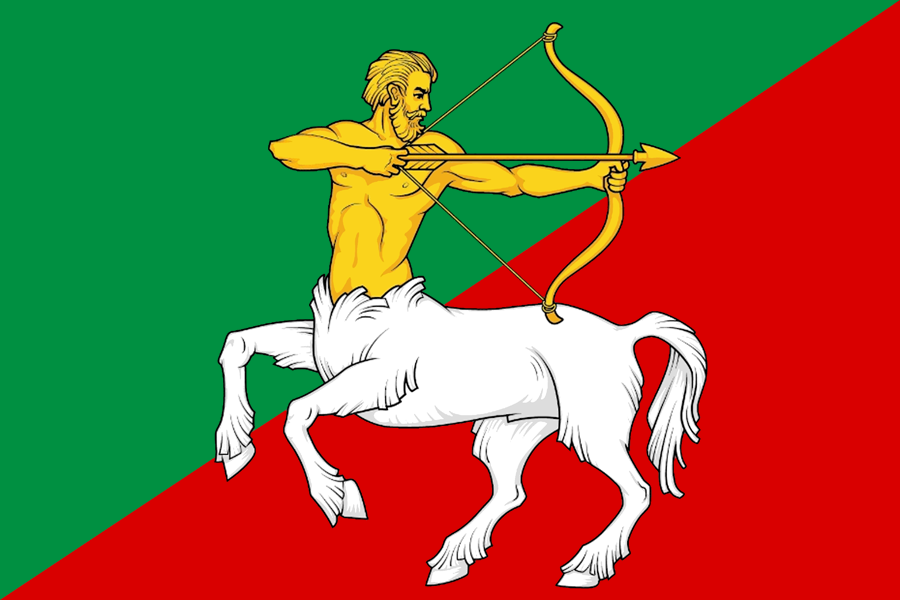
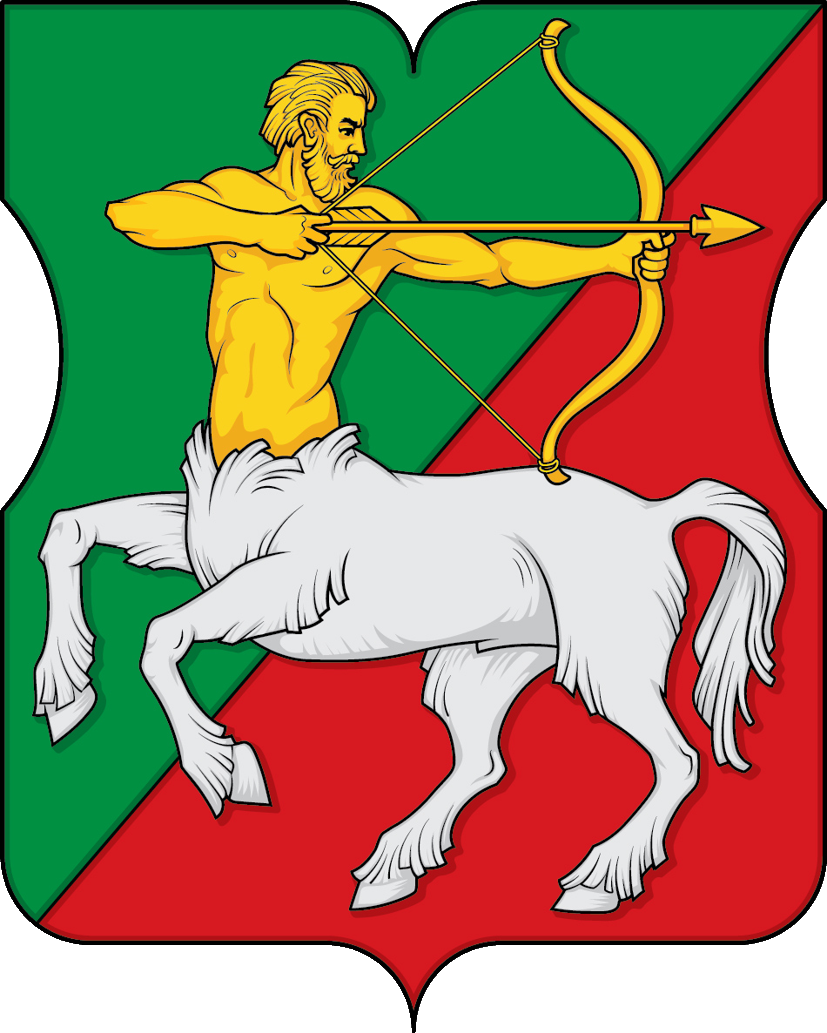
- Flag Coat of arms
- Location of Butyrsky District on the map of Moscow
- Coordinates: 55°48′58″N 37°35′09″E
- Country: Russia
- Federal subject: Moscow

Area
  - Total: 5.04 km^{2} (1.95 sq mi)

Population
  - Estimate (2017): 68,700
- Time zone: UTC+
- OKTMO ID: 45353000
- Website: http://butyrsky.mos.ru/

Butyrsky District (Russian: Бутырский райо́н) is an administrative district (raion) of North-Eastern Administrative Okrug, and one of the 125 raions of Moscow, Russia. It is 6 km north of the Moscow city center, located just outside the third ring road, with Timiryazevsky District to the west and Marfino District and Maryina roshcha District to the east. The area of the district is 5.04 square kilometers (1.95 sq mi). Population: 68,700 (2017 est.).

== History ==
History first records the village of Butyrka in the 14th century, on the road from Moscow north to Dmitriv (that road is now Butyrskaya Street running up the western border of the district.) The village eventually came into the possession of boyar Nikita Romanovich Zakharin, the grandfather of Tsar Michael I. The farming area gradually developed as a soldier's settlement, then as a fashionable residential area after 1812. After WWII, the area developed with blocks of apartment buildings.

== See also ==
- Administrative divisions of Moscow
