= Timiryazevsky District =

Timiryazevsky District Тимирязевский район (Russian)
- District
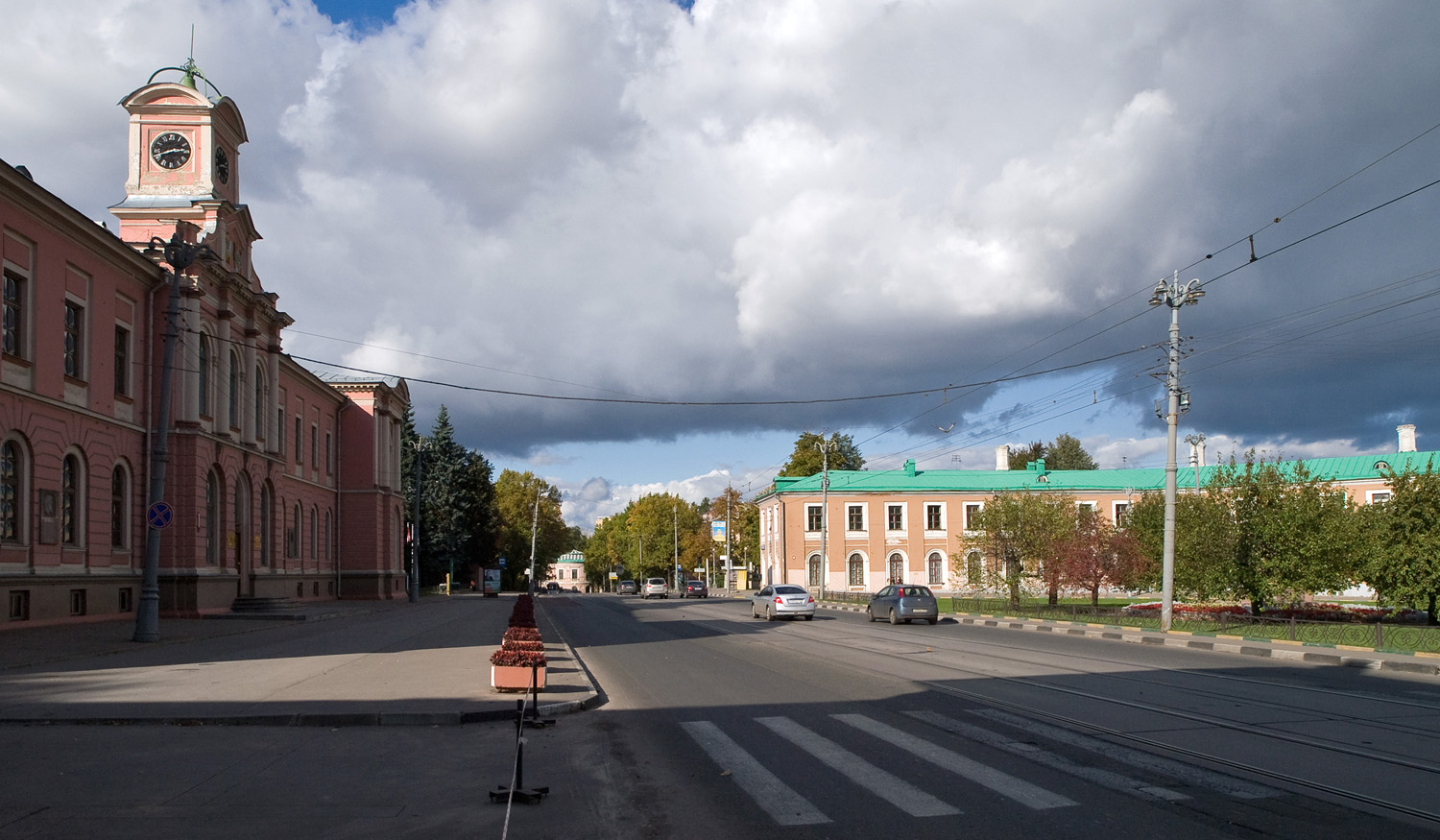
- Timiryazev Agricultural Academy, Timiryazevsky District

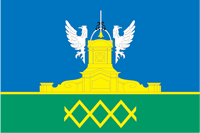
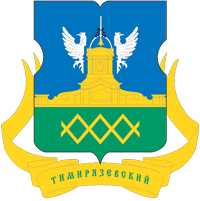
- Flag Coat of arms
- Location of Timiryazevsky District on the map of Moscow
- Coordinates: 55°49′N 37°34′E
- Country: Russia
- Federal subject: Moscow

Area
  - Total: 10.43 km^{2} (4.03 sq mi)

Population
  - Estimate (2017): 82,800
- Time zone: UTC+
- OKTMO ID: 45346000
- Website: https://timiryazevskiy.mos.ru/

Timiryazevsky District (Russian: Тимирязевский райо́н) is an administrative district (raion) of Northern Administrative Okrug, and one of the 125 raions of Moscow, Russia. The district is known for its public parks - Timiryazavsky Park and the Dubki Park - and the Timiryazev Agricultural Academy. The total area of the district is 10.43 square kilometers (4.03 sq mi). Population: 82,800 (2017 est.)

== History ==
Timiryazavsky Park is near the site of the Petrovsko-Razumovskoye estate. The estate was the ancestral home of the Shuysky family, sold to the Naryshkin family in 1676 and passed to Peter the Great in 1705 and became known as 'Petrovsky'. It was owned by the Razumovsky Family in the 18th and 19th centuries. On the grounds was built the Razumovsky Palace, the architect of which was Nicholas Benois. 1n 1861, the palace became the home of the Petrovsky Agricultural and Forestry Academy, today the Timiryazev Agricultural Academy.

The academy, and the district, are named for Kliment Timiryazev, a botanist who established a faculty and laboratory of vegetable physiology at the Petrovsky Academy. The academy houses several museums open to the public, including what the district government calls 'the only horse-breeding museum in the world'.

== Landmarks ==
The district contains a designated protected natural area known as the Petrovsko-Razumovskoye Integrated Reserve (Russian: Комплексный заказник «Петровско-Разумовское»), which consists of two parts: Dubki Park and the Experimental Forest Dacha (LOD) of the Timiryazev Agricultural Academy. In 2010, the reserve status was revoked by the Supreme Court of Russia.

There are also several monuments of historical and cultural significance in the area. The main landmark is the Petrovsko-Razumovskoye Estate, which features numerous buildings and a historic park. Monuments dedicated to renowned scientists are located near the Timiryazev Agricultural Academy, whose educational buildings also house three public museums (including the Horse Breeding Museum) and approximately 15 departmental museums used for academic purposes.

== Parks and Green Spaces ==
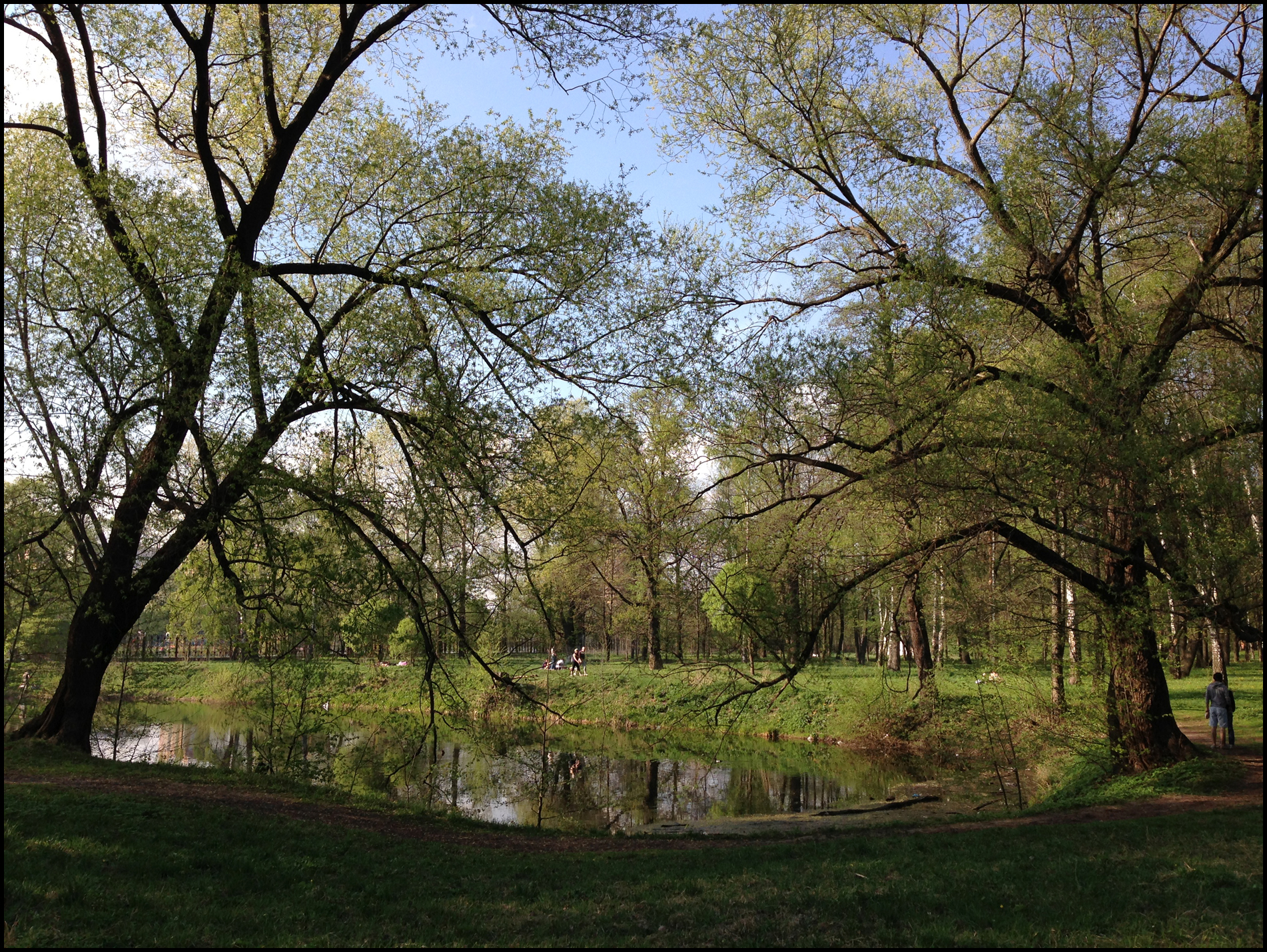
Timiryazevsky Park

=== Timiryazevsky Park ===
Timiryazevsky Park is located between Bolshaya Akademicheskaya Street, Timiryazevskaya Street, and Vucheticha Street. Its total area exceeds 230 hectares.

In the 16th century, the village of Semchino was located in the area that is now part of the park. It was later renamed Petrovsko-Razumovskoye. In the 17th century, the village belonged to Kirill Naryshkin, grandfather of Peter the Great. In 1865, the estate was purchased by the state for the establishment of the Petrovsky Agricultural and Forestry Academy (now the Timiryazev Agricultural Academy), including the Experimental Forest Dacha, which was organized by forester Alfons Vargas de Bedemar. The forest was divided into 14 sectors for studying the growth of various tree species.

Timiryazevsky Park is almost entirely covered by forest. Its flora includes centuries-old oaks, birches, and many plants listed in the Red Book of Moscow: lily of the valley, twinflower, liverleaf, Jacob’s ladder, iris pseudacorus, snow-white water lily, yellow anemone, marsh forget-me-not, European wild ginger, spreading bellflower, oxeye daisy, and others. Wildlife includes hedgehogs, squirrels, Daubenton's bats, hawks, owls, and small birds such as nuthatches, bramblings, cuckoos, chaffinches, little buntings, nightingales, and robins. In the northern part of the park is a large garden pond with a beach area. Common goldeneyes and tufted ducks nest here, and the pond itself is home to tench. The pond was formed by the Zhabenka River, a tributary of the Likhoborka River, which flows through the park (partially on the surface, partially through an underground culvert).

Today, the park is home to several buildings of the Timiryazev Agricultural Academy, including its Experimental Forest Dacha, Fruit Research Station, and the Edelstein Vegetable Research Station. In the northern part of the park, the main building of the former Petrovsky Academy, designed by architects Pietro Campioni and Nikolai Benois, still stands on the site of the dismantled Petrovsko-Razumovskoye estate. The building is now a federally protected cultural heritage site and houses the Timiryazev Agricultural Academy. The park also features a grotto built in 1806 by architect Adam Menelas. The grotto is historically known as the site of the 1869 murder of student Ivan Ivanov by members of the revolutionary group "People’s Reprisal" led by Sergey Nechayev. This event inspired Fyodor Dostoevsky’s novel *The Devils*.

=== Dubki Park ===
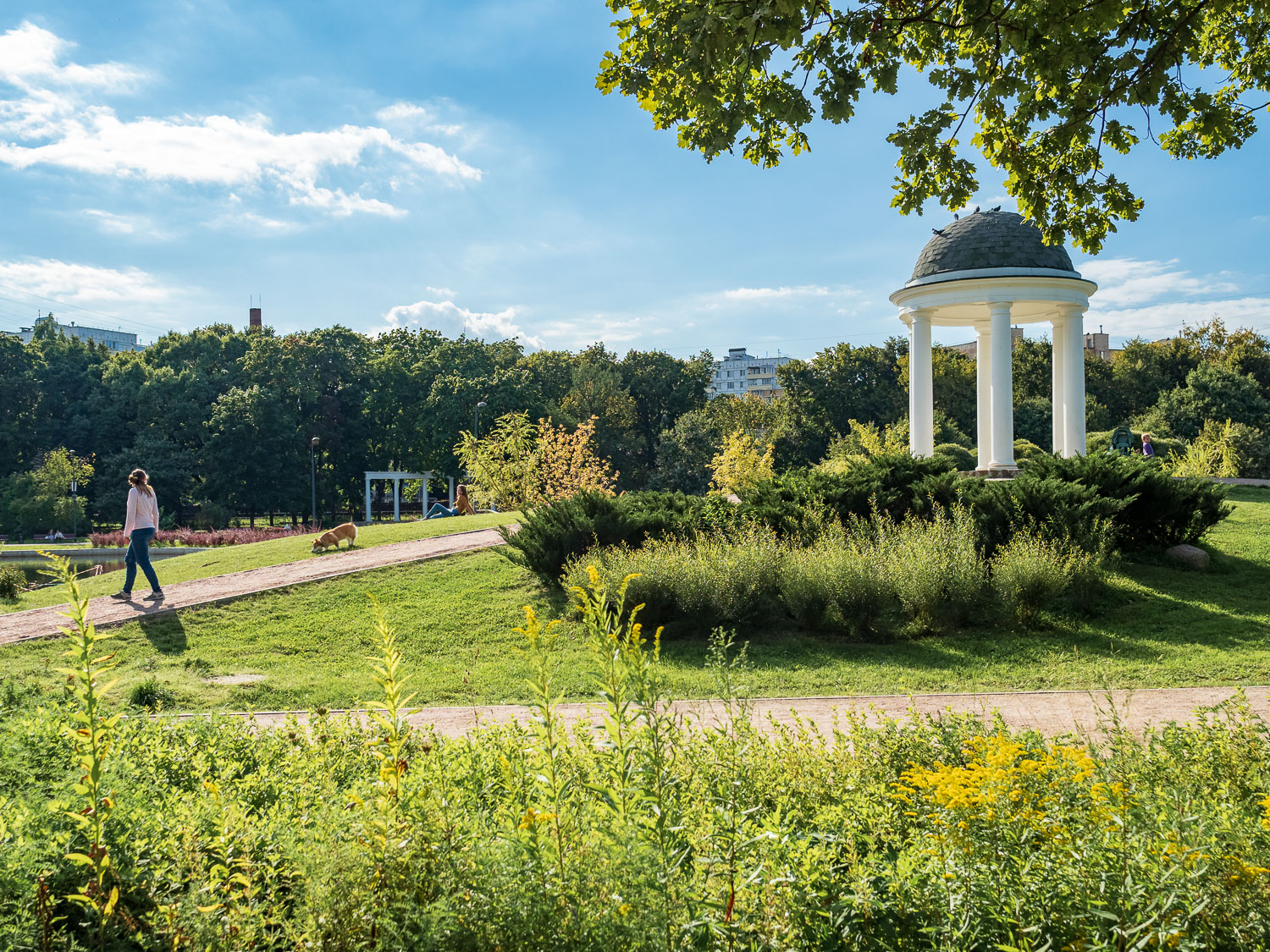
Dubki Park, 2020

Dubki Park, covering around 17 hectares, is located at the intersection of Ivanovsky Proyezd and Nemchinova Street, at 6 Dubki Street. It is an oak grove with an understory of hazel, rowan, and birch.

The name "Dubki" (meaning "Little Oaks") was given after World War II. Originally, the unnamed grove was located next to the Petrovsko-Razumovskoye estate and separated from it by a meadow.

In 2019, the park underwent a major renovation. The ponds were cleaned, the embankment landscaped with flowers and shrubs, new benches and lighting were installed. The colonnade along the western border and the rotunda between the ponds were restored. Paved walkways were added in the center with a checkered tile pattern, while paths in the wooded areas were made to resemble natural trails. Three playgrounds for different age groups were added, along with sports facilities such as volleyball and tennis courts, a hockey rink with stands, workout areas, and tables for table tennis.

=== Square on Bolshaya Akademicheskaya Street ===
This square, covering about 7 hectares, was developed in 2019 as part of the "My District" improvement program. It is located between Akademichesky Proyezd and Pryanishnikova Street, on the former site of Zhabiensky Meadow—named after the Zhabenka River, now enclosed in a culvert. The park includes walking paths, benches, and around 100 light fixtures. A children's play area features three playgrounds with slides, climbing structures, and a climbing wall. There is also a workout zone with pull-up bars and exercise equipment.

=== Square at the Prefecture of the Northern Administrative Okrug ===
This square, slightly over 2 hectares, is located near the prefecture building at 27 Timiryazevskaya Street. In 2005, to commemorate the 60th anniversary of Victory in World War II, a monument depicting a woman with outstretched arms was installed. It was created by sculptors Anton and Natalia Vyatkin and architect Andrey Mironov. In 2017, the square was renovated: tile paths were added, a workout area with pull-up bars and parallel bars was built, two playgrounds with safety flooring were installed, and the tennis court was resurfaced with professional hardcourt material.

== See also ==
- Administrative divisions of Moscow
