= Pechatniki =

Pechatniki may refer to:

- Pechatniki District, a raion of the South-Eastern Administrative Okrug.
- Pechatniki (Lyublinsko-Dmitrovskaya line), a Moscow Metro station on Line 10.
- Pechatniki (Bolshaya Koltsevaya line), a prospective Moscow Metro station on Line 11.
