= Pechatniki (Bolshaya Koltsevaya line) =

Moscow Metro station, Line 11

Pechatniki Печатники
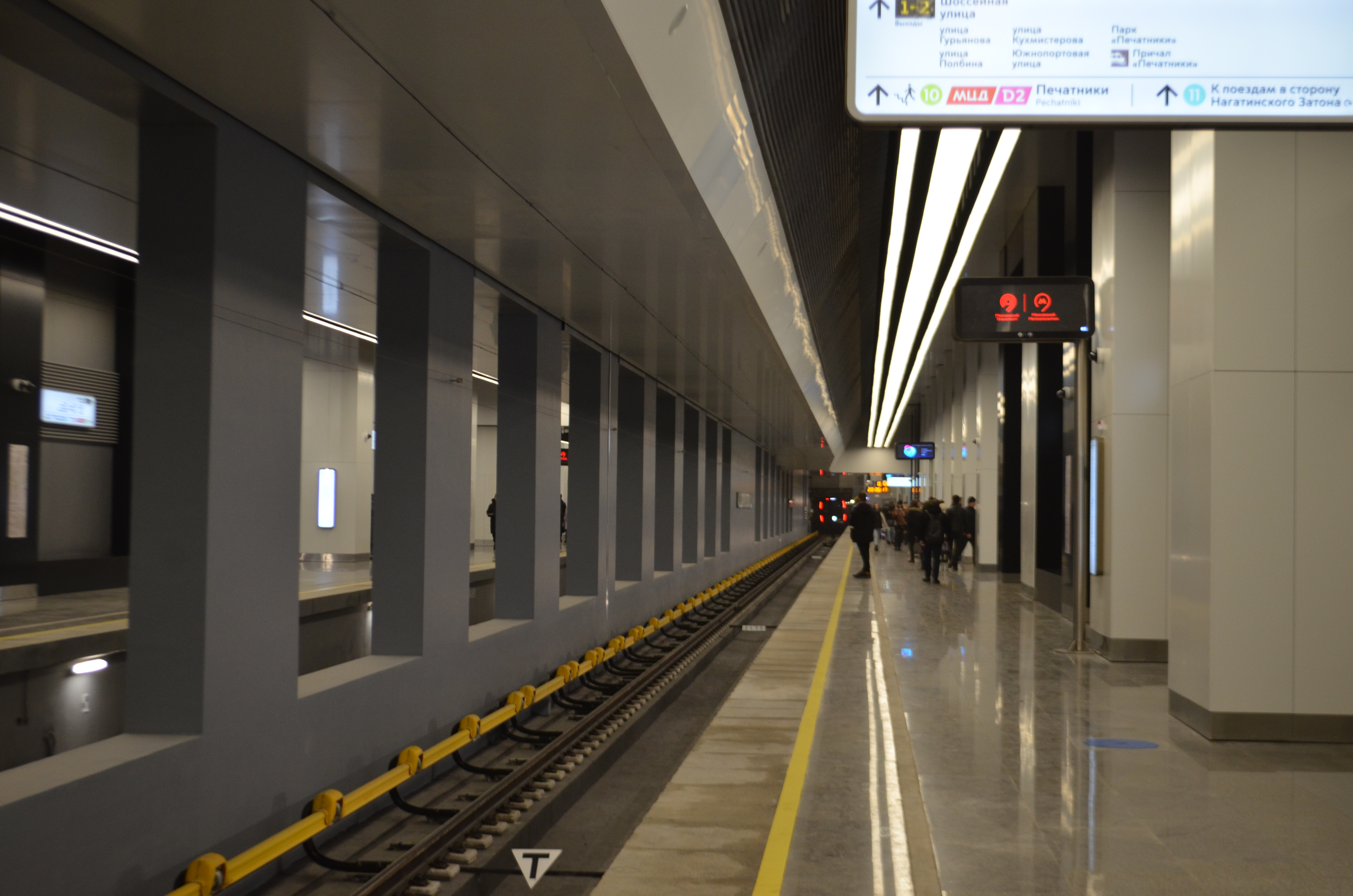
- The platform on opening day, 1 March 2023

General information
- Location: Pechatniki District; South-Eastern Administrative Okrug; Moscow; Russia
- Coordinates: 55.694°N 37.727°E
- Line: Bolshaya Koltsevaya line

History
- Opened: 1 March 2023 (3 years ago)

Services
Preceding station	Moscow Metro	Following station
Tekstilshchiki anticlockwise / outer	Bolshaya Koltsevaya line	Nagatinsky Zaton clockwise / inner
Kozhukhovskaya towards Fiztekh	Lyublinsko-Dmitrovskaya line transfer at Pechatniki	Volzhskaya towards Zyablikovo
Route map
Location
- Location within Moscow Metro

Pechatniki (Russian: Печатники) is a station on the Bolshaya Koltsevaya line of the Moscow Metro, in the Pechatniki District, between the planned stations Tekstilshchiki and Nagatinsky Zaton. There is a transfer to the Lyublinsko–Dmitrovskaya line, via its Pechatniki station. The nearby Pechatniki railway station opened in 2022 to allow for transfers to Line D2 of the Moscow Central Diameters, as part of a new transport interchange hub estimated to serve around 70,000 people daily.

The station is one of 14 Moscow Metro stations that were opened on 1 March 2023. (Note: Of the 14 stations, 9 are on the Bolshaya Koltsevaya line.) Pechatniki's technical launch was held on 30 December 2022, along with those of Tekstilshchiki, Nagatinsky Zaton, and Klenovy Bulvar, as part of the deployment of the new east section of the Bolshaya Koltsevaya line.

== Gallery ==
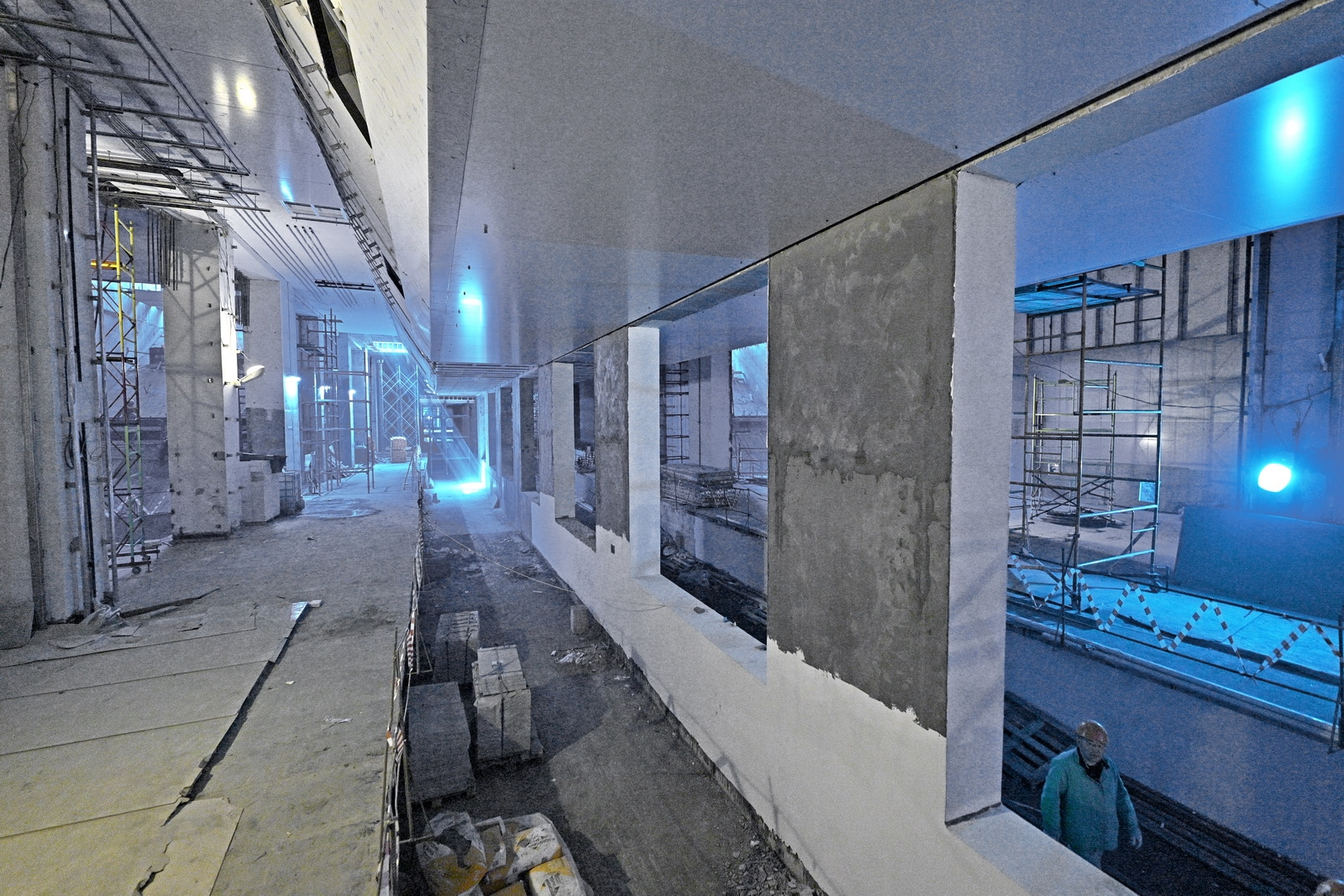
Platform under construction, July 2022

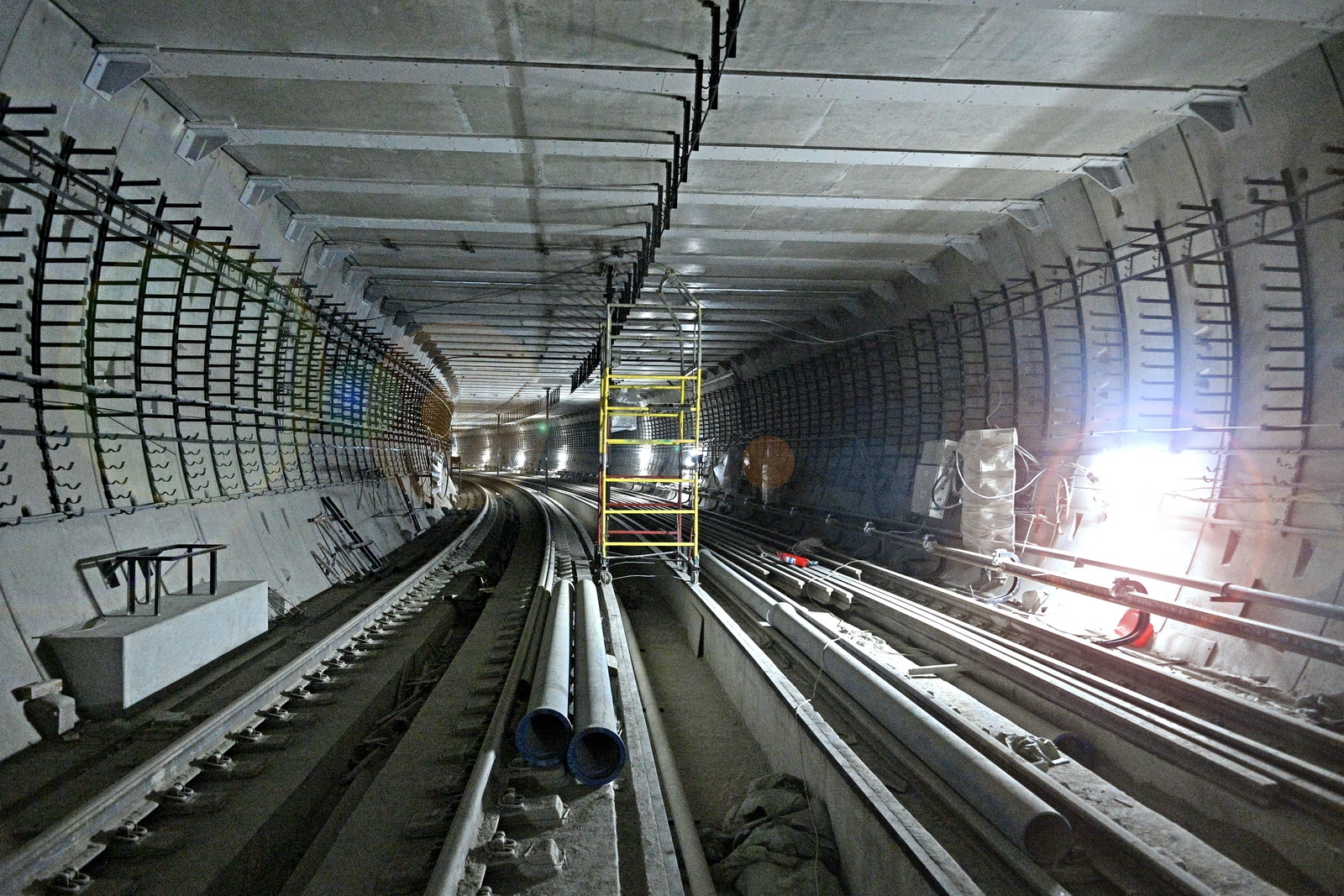
Tunnel under construction, March 2022

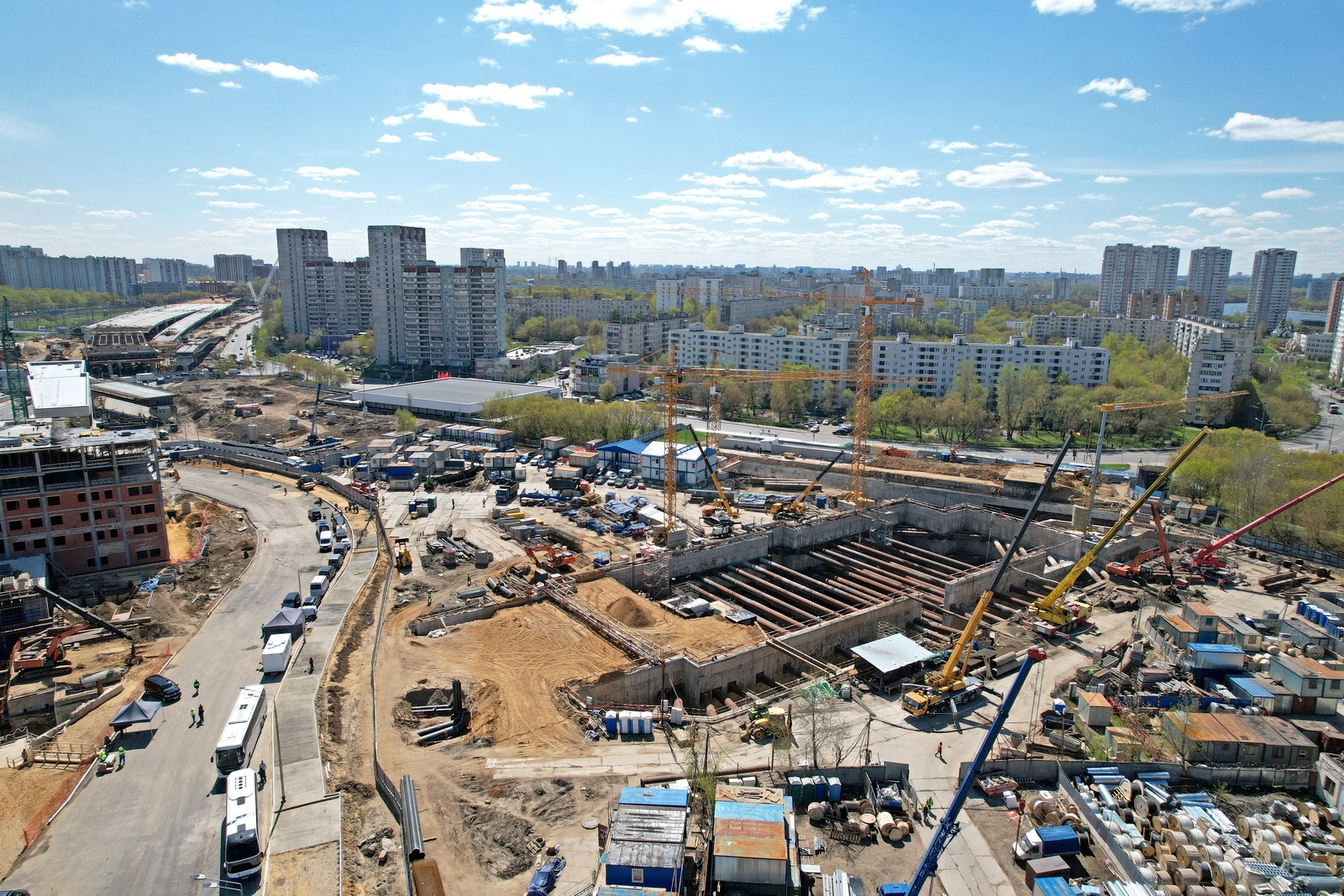
Construction site in May 2022

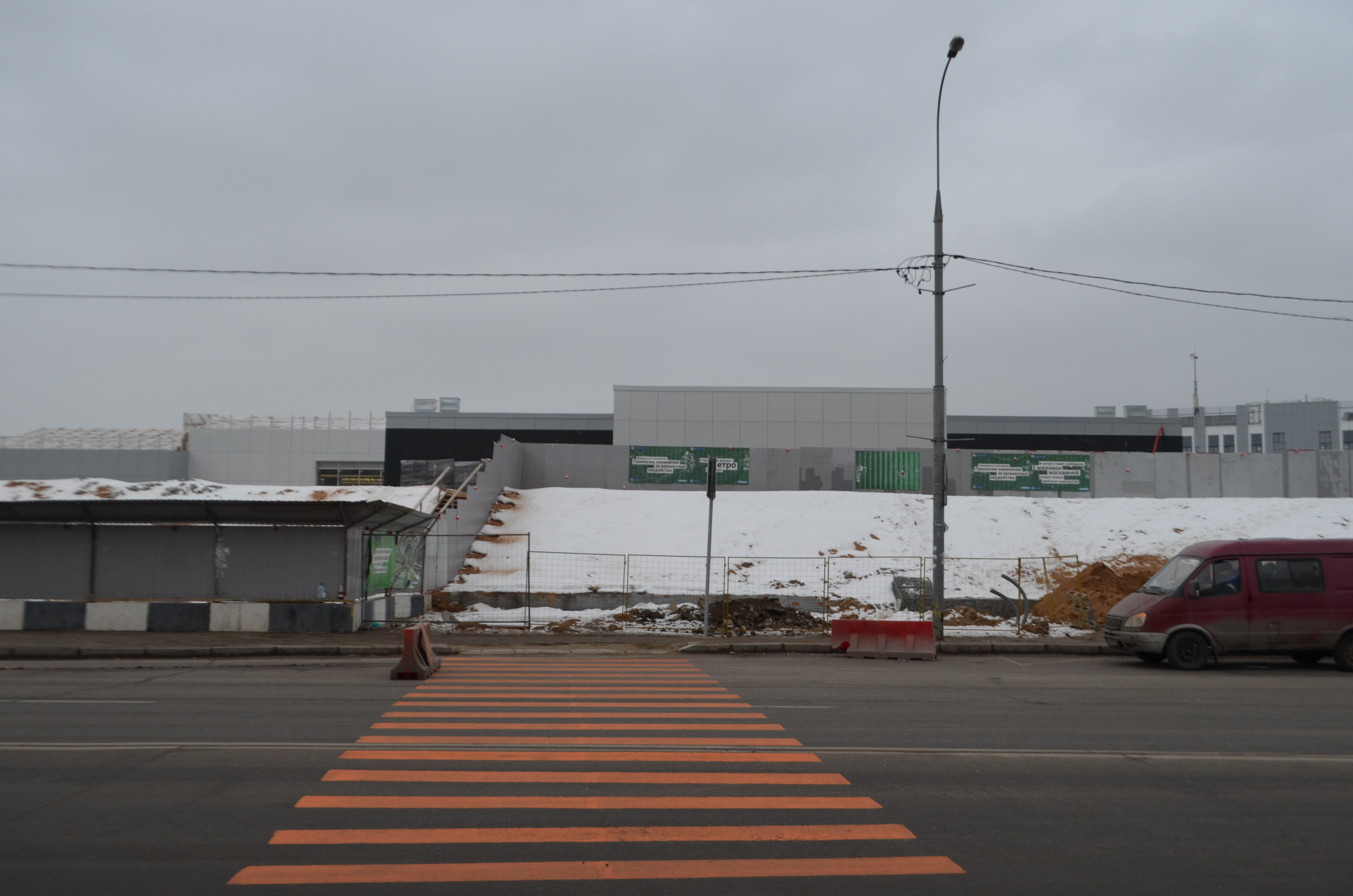
Construction on Guryanova Street on February 11, 2023

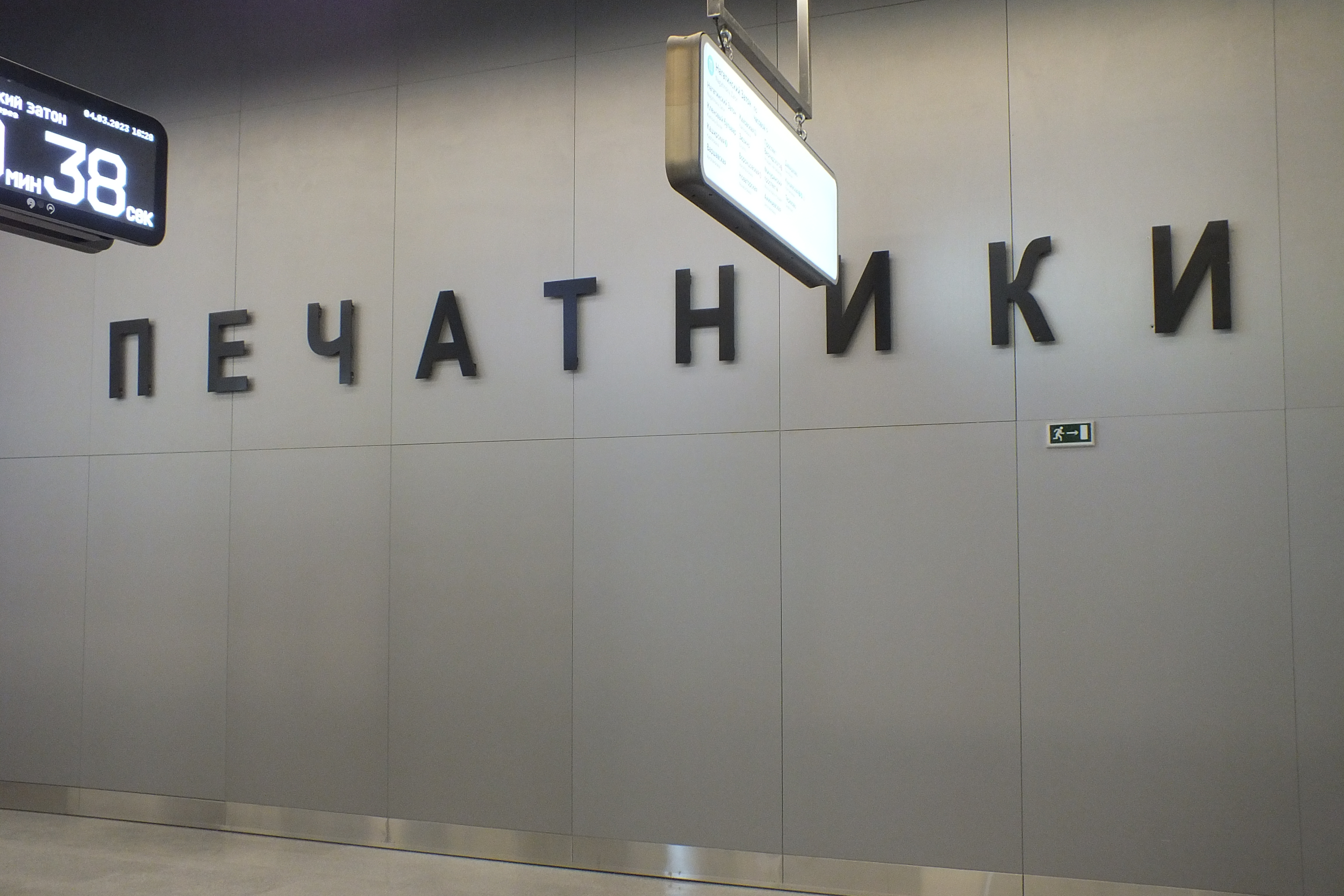
Name of the station on the wall
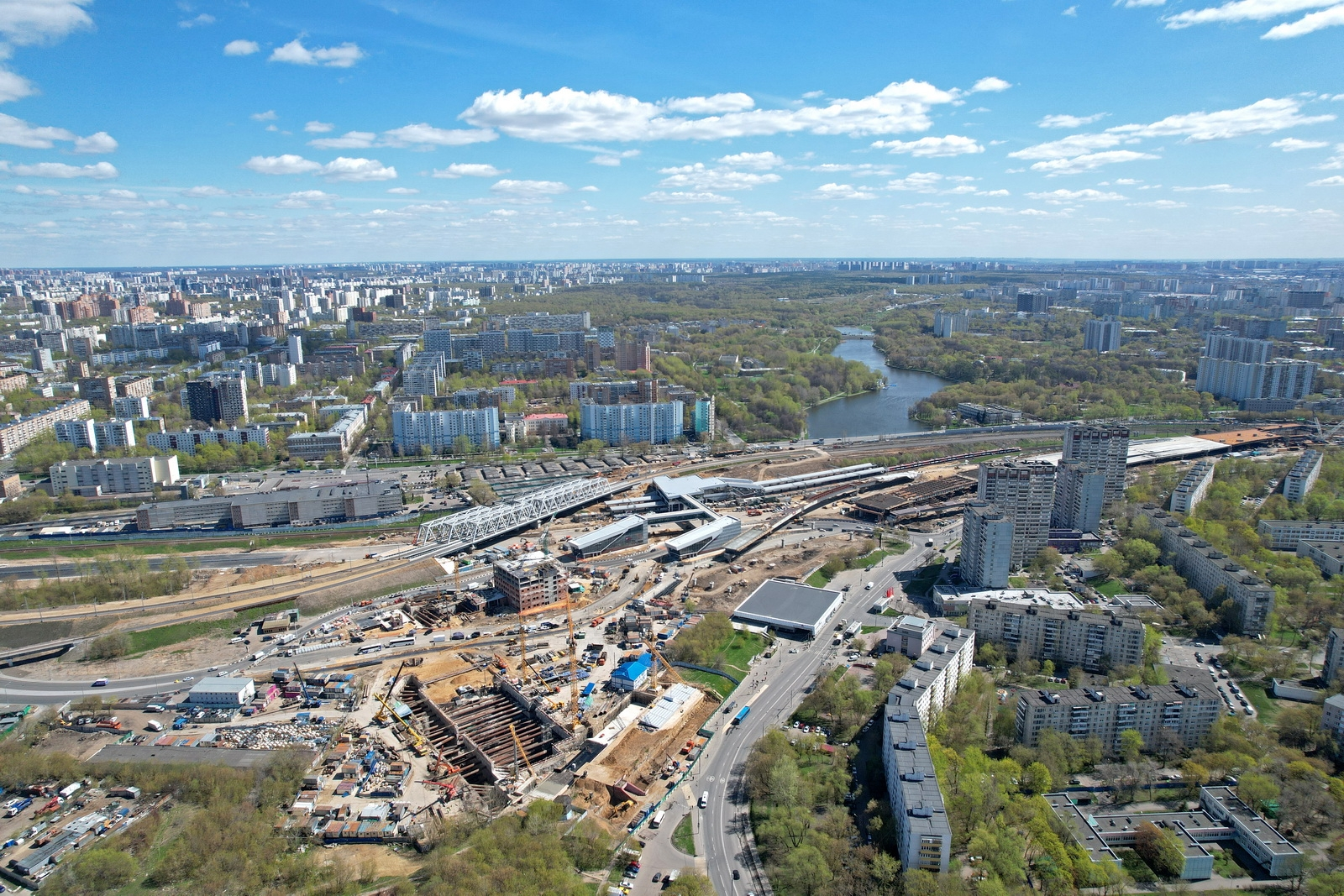
The metro station (foreground) under construction,
in front of Pechatniki railway station (midground)

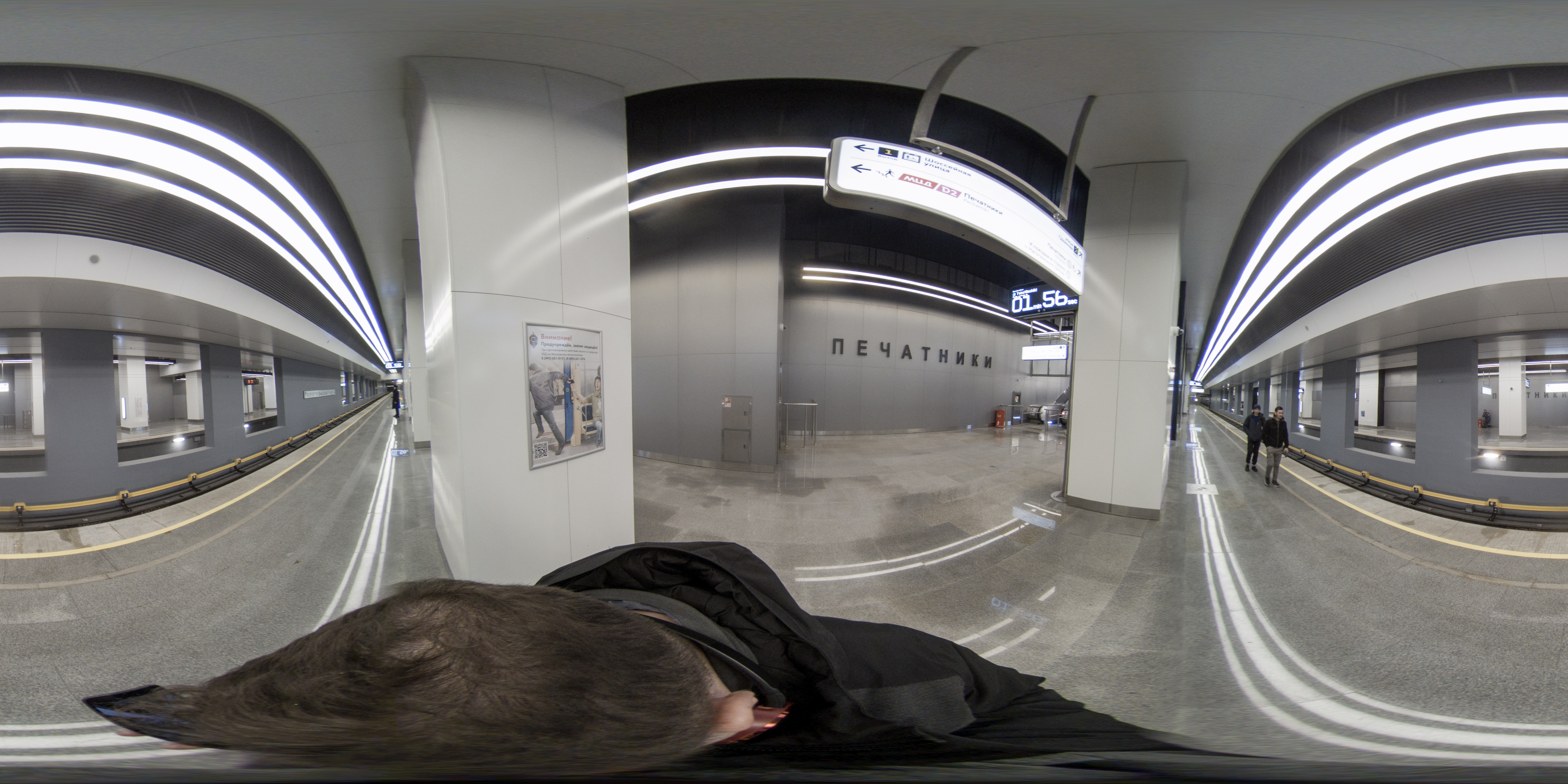
Platform hall (view as a 360° interactive panorama)
