= Tekstilshchiki =

Tekstilshchiki may refer to:

- Tekstilshchiki District, a district of Moscow, Russia
- Tekstilshchiki (Tagansko-Krasnopresnenskaya line), a station on the Tagansko-Krasnopresnenskaya line of the Moscow Metro, Moscow, Russia
- Tekstilshchiki (Bolshaya Koltsevaya line), a station on the Bolshaya Koltsevaya line of the Moscow Metro, Moscow, Russia
