= Bolshaya Koltsevaya line =

Moscow Metro line

Bolshaya Koltsevaya line (Big Circle line)

- Geographic map showing the approximate path of the Bolshaya Koltsevaya line (in teal) in the whole Moscow Metro network (in dark grey) including Central Circle, MCD and Monorail

Overview
- Other name: Large Circle Line
- Native name: Большая Кольцевая линия
- Locale: Moscow
- Stations: 29

Service
- Type: Rapid transit
- System: Moscow Metro
- Operator: Moskovsky Metropoliten
- Rolling stock: 81-775/776/777

History
- Opened: 11 August 1969 (Kakhovskaya line stations); 26 February 2018 (Bolshaya Koltsevaya stations); 1 March 2023 (circle completed)

Technical
- Line length: 57.538 km (35.752 mi)
- Character: Underground
- Track gauge: 1,520 mm (4 ft 11 27/32 in)
- Electrification: Third rail

The Bolshaya Koltsevaya line (Russian: Большая кольцевая линия; English: Big Circle Line; Line 11; Teal Line) is a rapid transit line of the Moscow Metro system in Moscow, Russia. It is the third circle line on the system, running outside of the existing circle Koltsevaya line and interlocking with the Moscow Central Circle.

The first section of the line opened on 26 February 2018, with the remaining stations opening on 1 March 2023. The line includes 29 stations, including three from the former Kakhovskaya line, and is 57.5 km (35.7 mi) long, which makes it the second longest circular metro line in the world, surpassing Line 10 of Beijing Subway by 514 m (1,686 ft), but falls short of Wuhan Metro Line 12's 59.9 km (37.2 mi) length. In November 2017, the city estimated the total cost of the project at 501 billion rubles, up from earlier estimates of 378.9 billion rubles.

Formerly known as the Third Interchange Contour, the city adopted "Bolshaya koltsevaya liniya" as the official name of the line after a vote via the "Active Citizen" web portal.

== Name ==
The working name of the project since inception was the Third Interchange Contour; however, prior to the opening of the line, the city authorities consulted residents to help decide on the name. In an initial survey on the Active Citizen survey website in October 2017, only 34% of the city’s residents voted to keep the working name.

Although retaining the working name was the most popular option, members of the city’s council on transportation infrastructure suggested another vote. Two reasons cited by transport expert Kirill Yankov were that all of the lines’ names to this point were in the feminine grammatical gender and that all the other line names were generally understood from a point of view of geography. The city held another vote on its website to allow citizens to choose between the existing name or the Bolshaya Koltsevaya line (Large Circle Line). Of the alternate names suggested by voters in the first vote, Bolshaya Koltsevaya was the most popular, with 9,000 votes.

In the second vote, Bolshaya Koltsevaya Line was selected with 53.3% of the votes versus 36.5% for the Third Interchange Contour.

== Development ==
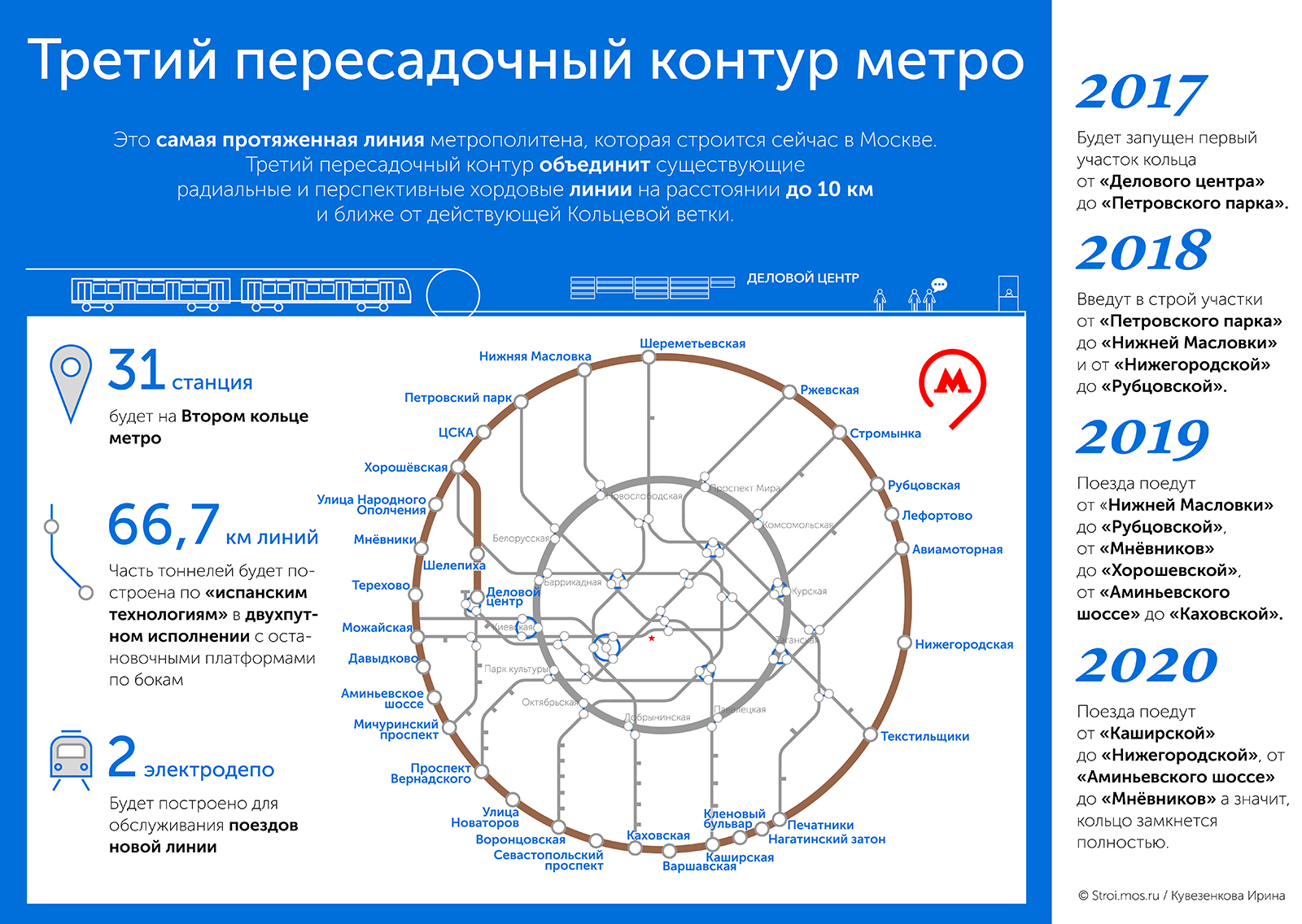
Initial construction timetable for the Bolshaya Koltsevaya line

The original plans called for a line that is 58 kilometres (36 mi) with 27 new stations.

The entire project was supposed to be completed by 2020–2021. By 2018, the completion date had been postponed until 2023.

=== First sections ===
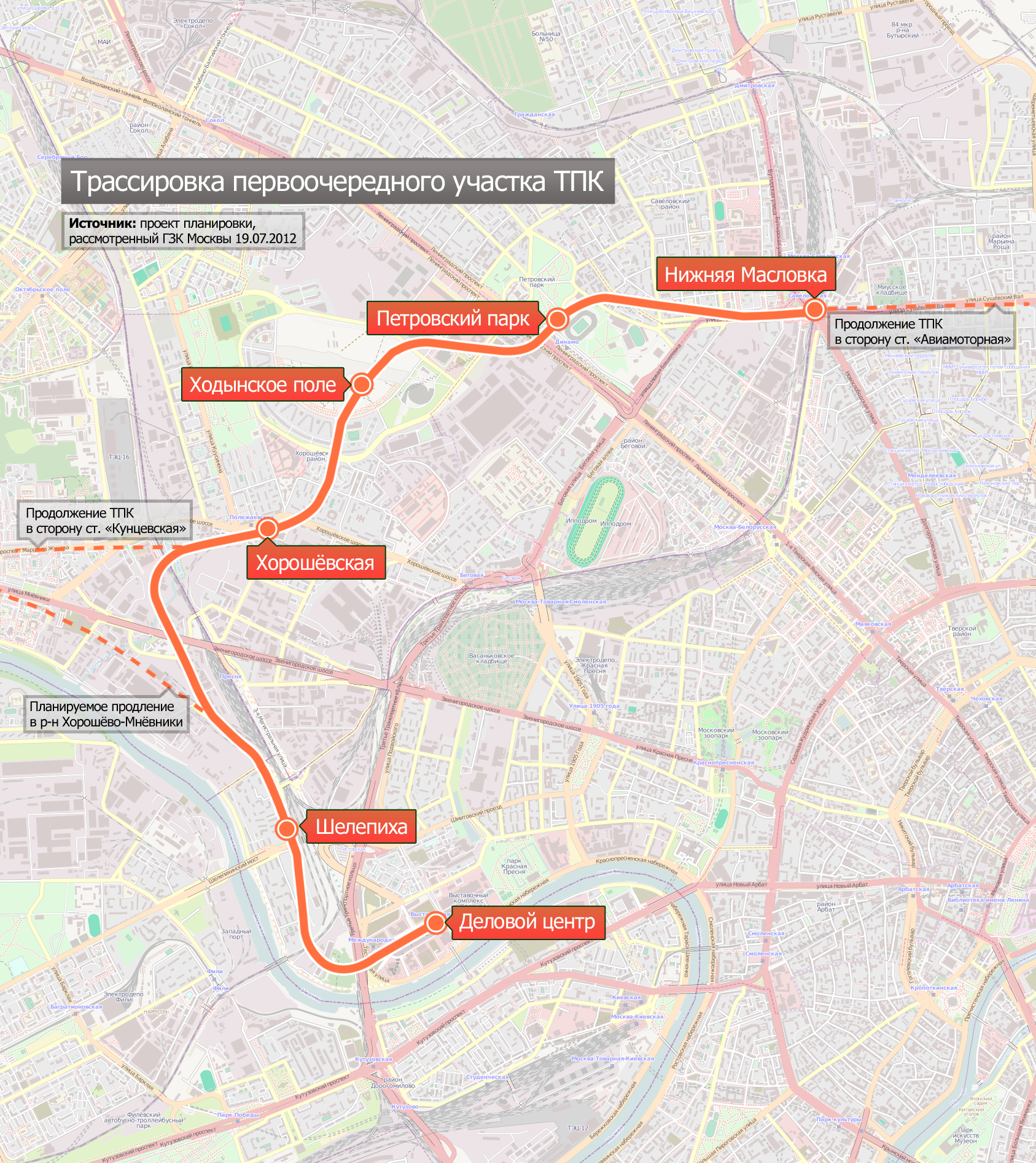
First section with a temporal branch with five stations from Delovoy Tsentr to Petrovsky Park.

Video of stations of first section on the first day of operation

The five stations from Petrovsky Park to Delovoy Tsentr opened on 26 February 2018. Savyolovskaya was opened on 30 December 2018.

=== Further extension ===
The northeastern section was initially scheduled to be completed in 2018, but was delayed for two years until it was opened on 27 March 2020 and 31 December 2020. On 1 April 2021, the section between Khoroshyovskaya and Mnyovniki was opened. This section includes the part of the line from Elektrozavodskaya to Nizhegorodskaya. The existing, short, three-station Kakhovskaya line was incorporated into the line. Kakhovskaya was reopened on 7 December 2021 after reconstruction within the segment to Mnyovniki. The sections from Savyolovskaya to Elektrozavodskaya and from Kakhovskaya to Nizhegorodskaya opened on 1 March 2023. The stations of Shelepikha and Delovoy Tsentr were closed on 22 June 2024 and were reintegrated as part of the Rublyovo-Arkhangelskaya line on 5 September 2026.

== Stations ==
Station Name		Transfers	Notes
English	Russian	Transfers	Notes
↑ Loop line towards Maryina Roshcha ↑
Savyolovskaya	Савёловская	Savyolovskaya; Moscow Savyolovskaya	
Petrovsky Park	Петровский парк	Dinamo	
CSKA	ЦСКА		
Khoroshyovskaya	Хорошёвская	Polezhayevskaya; Khoroshyovo	
Narodnoye Opolcheniye	Народное Ополчение	Narodnoye Opolcheniye	
Mnyovniki	Мнёвники		
Terekhovo	Терехово		
Kuntsevskaya	Кунцевская	Kuntsevskaya; Kuntsevskaya	
Davydkovo	Давыдково		
Aminyevskaya	Аминьевская	Aminyevskaya	
Michurinsky Prospekt	Мичуринский проспект	Michurinsky Prospekt	
Prospekt Vernadskogo	Проспект Вернадского	Prospekt Vernadskogo	
Novatorskaya	Новаторская	Novatorskaya	
Vorontsovskaya	Воронцовская	Kaluzhskaya	
Zyuzino	Зюзино		
Kakhovskaya	Каховская	Sevastopolskaya	
Varshavskaya	Варшавская		
Kashirskaya	Каширская	Kashirskaya	
Klenovy Bulvar	Кленовый бульвар	Klenovy Bulvar	
Nagatinsky Zaton	Нагатинский Затон		
Pechatniki	Печатники	Pechatniki; Pechatniki	
Tekstilshchiki	Текстильщики	Tekstilshchiki; Tekstilshchiki	
Nizhegorodskaya	Нижегородская	Nizhegorodskaya; Nizhegorodskaya; Nizhegorodskaya	
Aviamotornaya	Авиамоторная	Aviamotornaya; Aviamotornaya	
Lefortovo	Лефортово		
Elektrozavodskaya	Электрозаводская	Elektrozavodskaya	
Sokolniki	Сокольники	Sokolniki; Mitkovo	
Rizhskaya	Рижская	Rizhskaya; Rizhskaya	
Maryina Roshcha	Марьина Роща	Maryina Roshcha; Maryina Roshcha	
↓ Loop line towards Savyolovskaya ↓

== Rolling stock ==
Subway car types used on the line over the years:

Type	Dates
Series 81-760/761	2018 - 2021
Series 81-760А/761А/763А	2018 - 2021
Series 81-765.3/766.3/767.3	2018 - 2021, 2023
Series 81-765.4/766.4/767.4	2019 - 2021, 2023
Series 81-765/766/767	2020 - 2021, 2023
Series 81-775/776/777	2021—present

== Maps ==
schematic inc. MCC

true location, no MCC (outdated scheme)
