= Varshavskaya (Moscow Metro) =

Moscow Metro station

Varshavskaya Варшавская
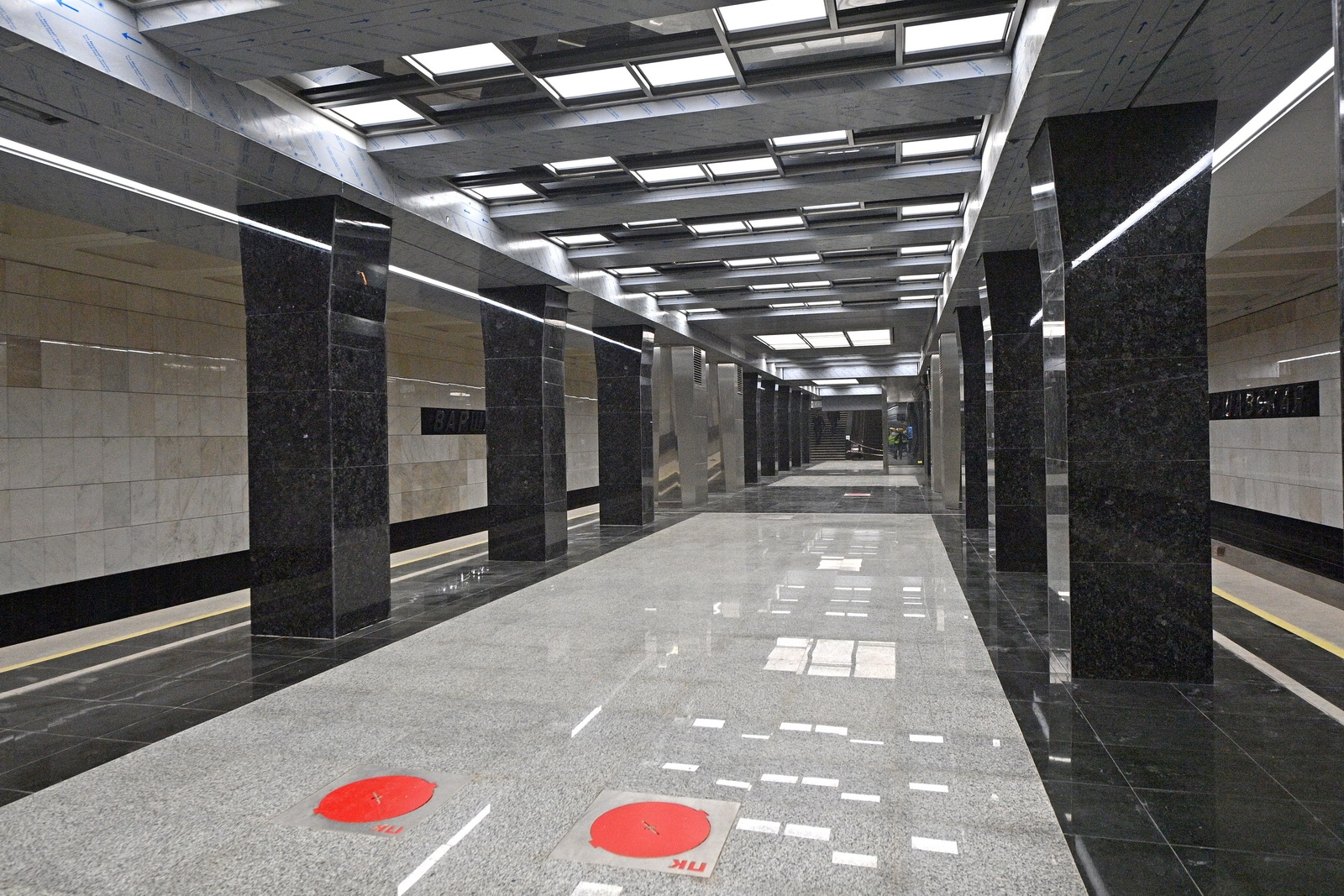
- reconstruction in November 2022

General information
- Location: Chongarsky Boulevard, Nagorny District, Southern Administrative Okrug; Moscow; Russia
- Coordinates: 55.6533°N 37.6194°E
- System: Moscow Metro station
- Owner: Moskovsky Metropoliten
- Line: Bolshaya Koltsevaya line
- Platforms: 1
- Tracks: 2

Construction
- Depth: 9 metres (30 ft)
- Platform levels: 1
- Parking: No

Other information
- Station code: 027

History
- Opened: 11 August 1969; 57 years ago
- Closed: 26 October 2019; 6 years ago
- Rebuilt: 1 March 2023; 3 years ago

Services
Preceding station	Moscow Metro	Following station
Kashirskaya anticlockwise / outer	Bolshaya Koltsevaya line	Kakhovskaya clockwise / inner
Route map
Location
- Location within Moscow Metro

Varshavskaya (Russian: Варшавская) is a Moscow Metro station in the Nagorny District, Southern Administrative Okrug, Moscow. It is on the Bolshaya Koltsevaya line, between Kakhovskaya and Kashirskaya stations.

Varshavskaya opened on 11 August 1969 as part of the Zamoskvoretskaya line and up until 1995 was served by its trains. It the station on the line of the Metro.

== Name ==
Varshavskaya is named after Varshavskoye Highway, under which it is situated. The highway in turn takes its name from Warsaw, the capital of Poland.

== Design ==
The station was designed by architects Nina Alyoshina and Nataliya Samoylova to a typical 1960s Moscow pillar-trispan design - "sorokonozhka" (centipede) and features two rows of 40 square pillars which flare towards the top faced with pink-yellow marble. A floor laid with grey granite of various shades and asphalt on the platform edges. The walls are covered by indigo ceramic tiles and blue marble socle. In addition there are several metallic artworks depicting silhouette images of famous landmarks in the city of Warsaw (work of Kh. Rysin, A. Lapin, D. Bodniyek) The station is located next to two important southbound arteries – the Varshavskoye Highway and the Kolomenskoye Railway station of the Paveletsky suburban railway line, but neither are pointed in Warsaw's direction and neither reach the city. The eastern vestibule has subways leading directly to the rail platforms, whilst the western vestibule is situated under the T-junction of the highway and the Chongarsky Boulevard that comes off it. In 2019, as part of the reconstruction of the Kakhovskaya line and its future inclusion in the Bolshaya Koltsevaya line, work began on replacing the entire decoration of the station.

Behind the station is a branch that leads to the Zamoskvoretskoye depot which serves both the Kakhovskaya and the Zamoskvoretskaya lines. Because of this, on occasion there is a direct service from Varshavskaya to all northbound stations on the Zamoskvoretskaya line and vice versa. Trains that do that are singled out by being eight rather than six cars long.
