= Pechatniki railway station =

Railway station in Moscow, Russia

Pechatniki Печатники
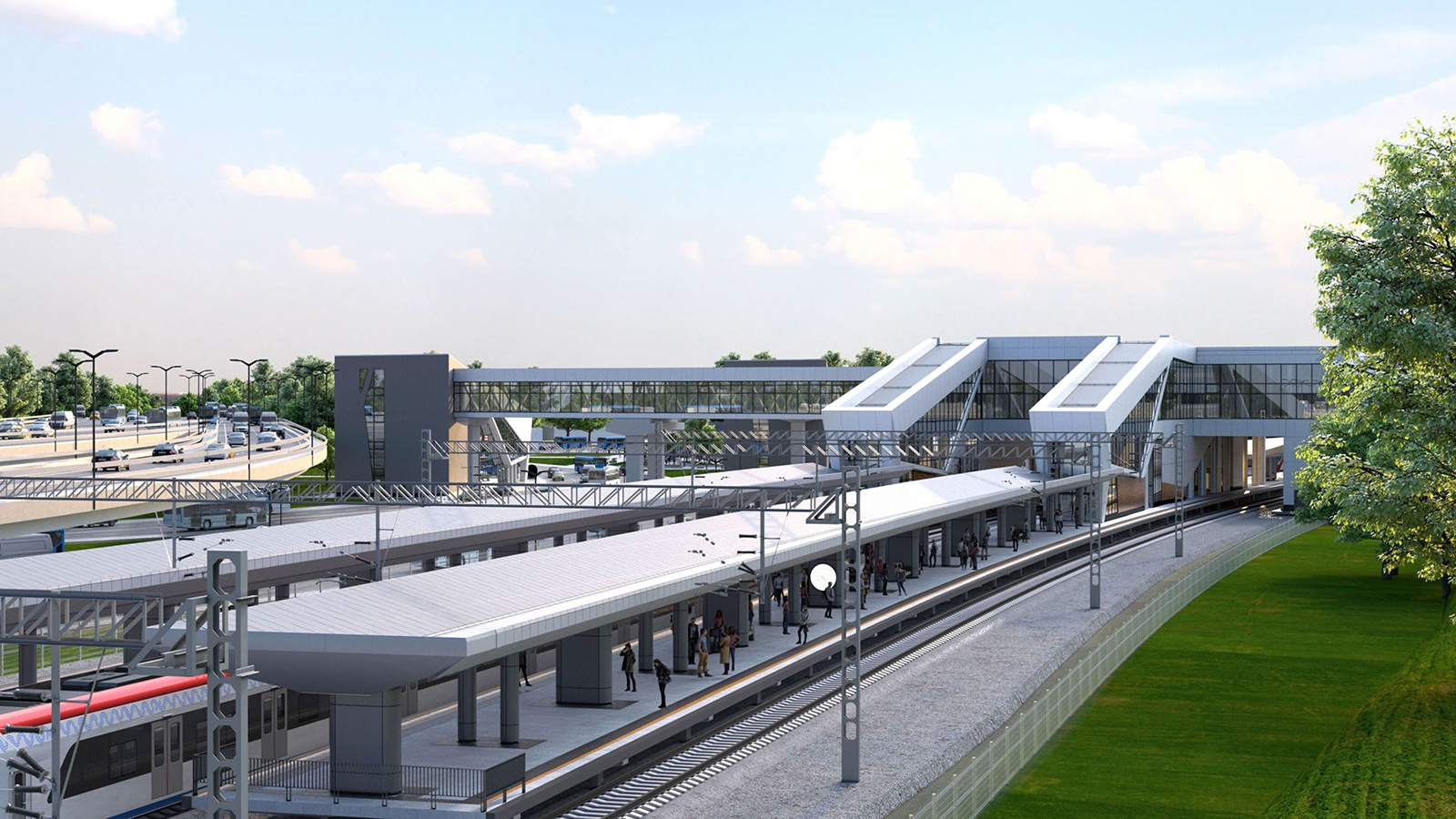

General information
- Location: Pechatniki District; Moscow; Russia
- Coordinates: 55.6927°N 37.7322°E
- System: Moscow Railway platform
- Owner: Russian Railways
- Operator: Moscow Railway

History
- Opened: 10 June 2022

Services
| Preceding station | Moscow Railway (commuter service) | Following station |
|---|---|---|
| Tekstilshchiki towards Moscow Kursky | Kurskoye line | Kubanskaya towards Tula |
| Preceding station | Moscow Central Diameters | Following station |
| Tekstilshchiki towards Nakhabino | Line D2 | Kubanskaya towards Podolsk |
Proposed
| Tekstilshchiki towards Pushkino | Line D5 | Kubanskaya towards Domodedovo |
Location

Pechatniki is a railway station of Line D2 and planned D5 of the Moscow Central Diameters in Moscow. The construction project has been approved in June 2020. The station is opened on 10 June 2022. There is a transfer to both eponymous metro stations.

== Gallery ==
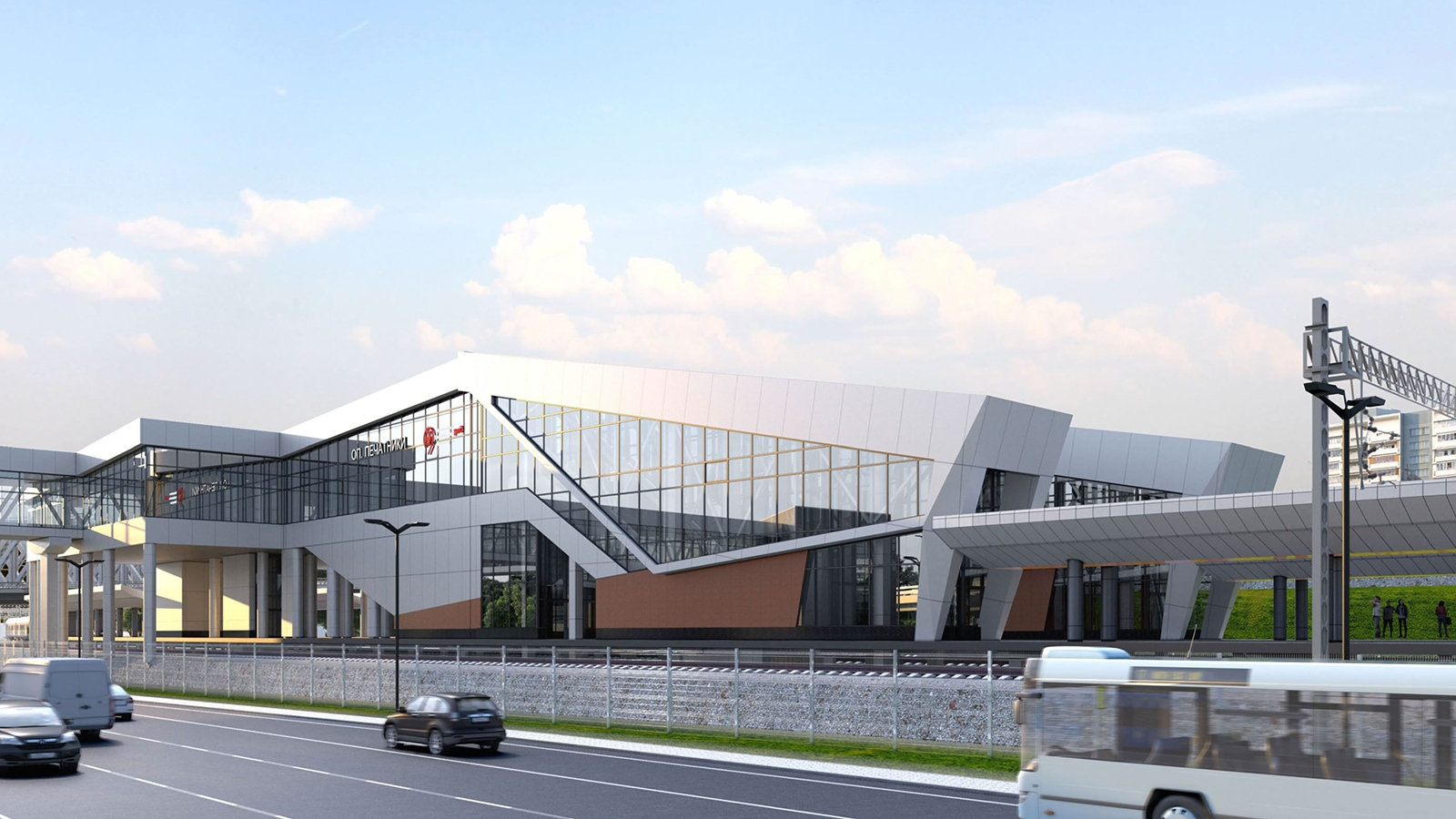

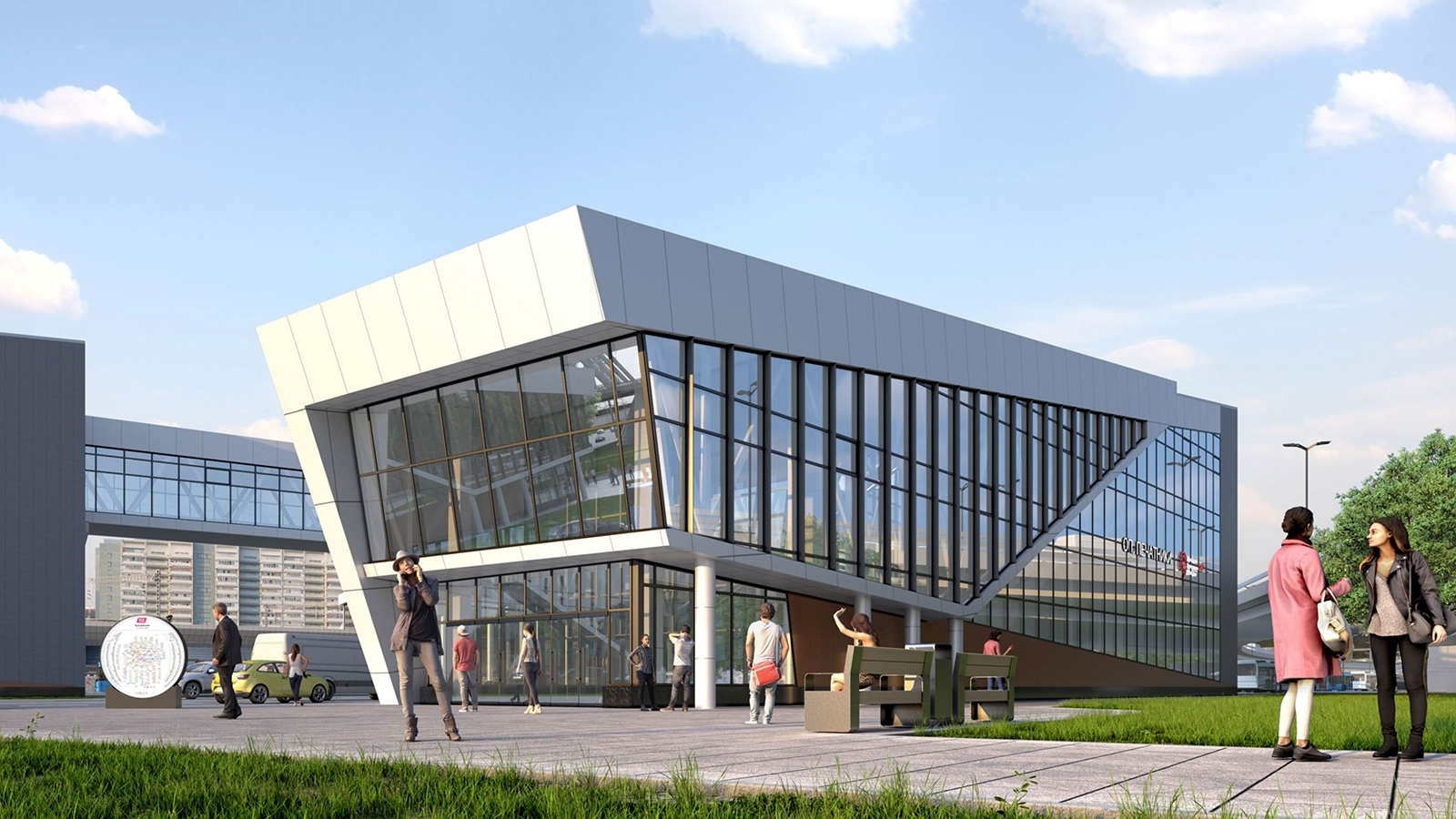

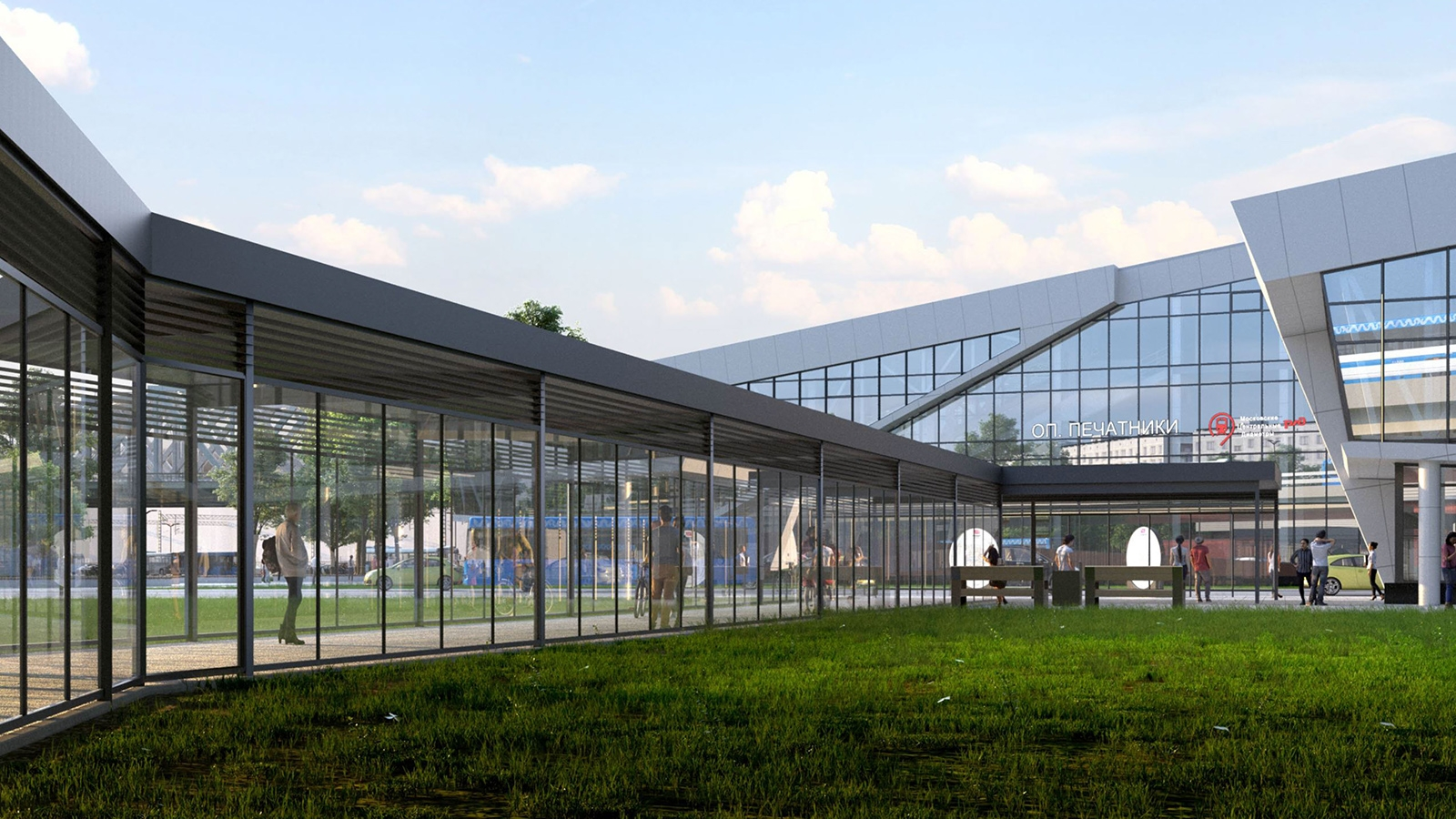
