= Kashirskaya =

Moscow Metro station

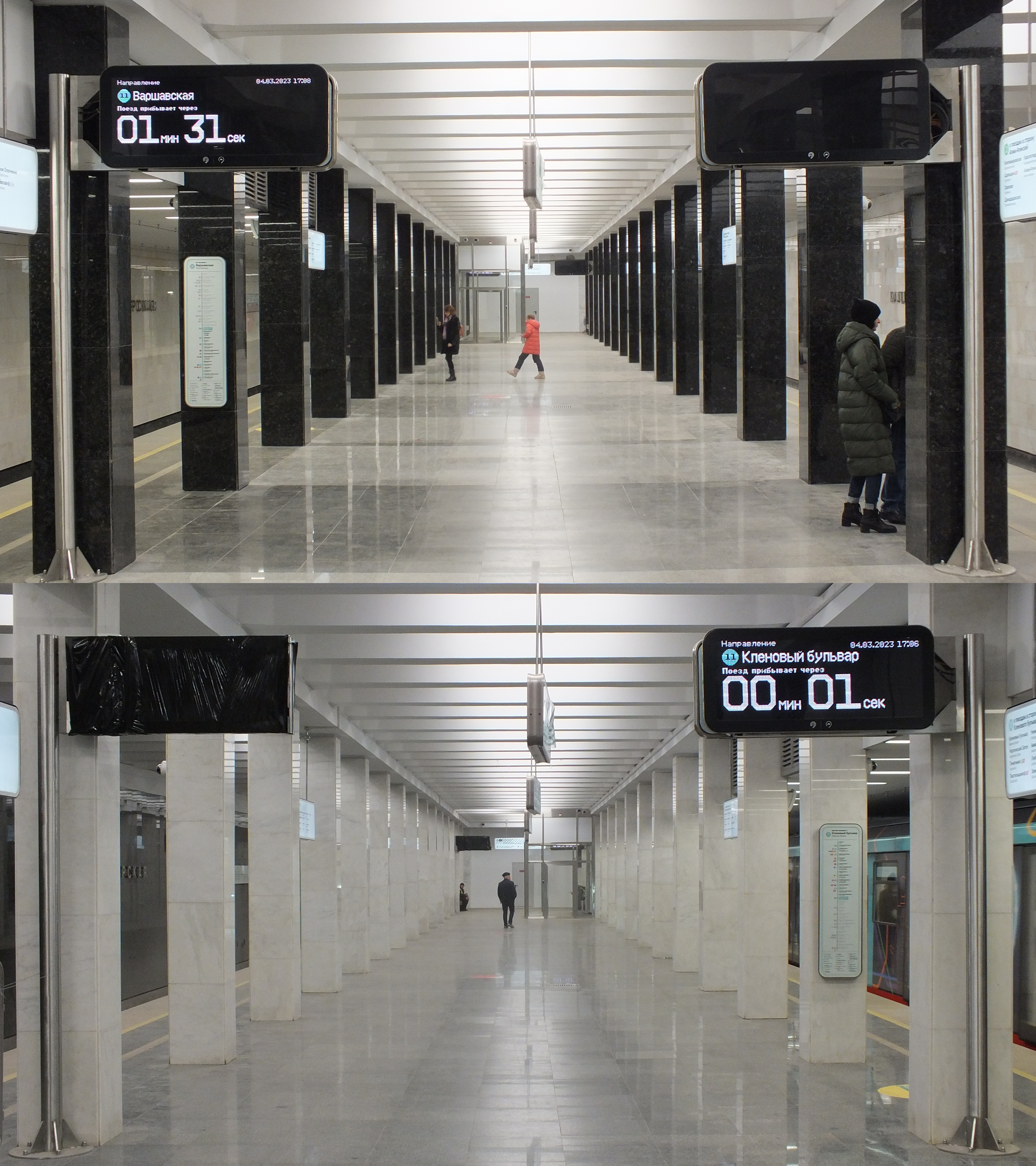
- Western (top) and eastern (bottom) halls of station

General information
- Location: Moskvorechye-Saburovo District; Nagatino-Sadovniki District; Southern Administrative Okrug; Moscow; Russia
- Coordinates: 55.6551°N 37.6487°E
- System: Moscow Metro station complex
- Owner: Moskovsky Metropoliten
- Lines: Zamoskvoretskaya line Bolshaya Koltsevaya line
- Platforms: 2 island platforms
- Tracks: 4
- Connections: Bus: м83, м86, е29, е80, е85, 770, с806, с820, с823, с838, 844, с850, с891, 897, 899. Night routes: н13

Construction
- Structure type: Shallow column station
- Depth: 7 metres (23 ft)
- Platform levels: 2
- Parking: No

Other information
- Station code: 025

History
- Opened: 11 August 1969; 57 years ago
- Closed: 26 October 2019; 6 years ago (Bolshaya Koltsevaya line)
- Rebuilt: 1 March 2023; 3 years ago (Bolshaya Koltsevaya line)

Passengers
- 2002: 25,261,650

Services
Preceding station	Moscow Metro	Following station
Kolomenskaya towards Khovrino	Zamoskvoretskaya line	Kantemirovskaya towards Alma-Atinskaya
Klenovy Bulvar anticlockwise / outer	Bolshaya Koltsevaya line	Varshavskaya clockwise / inner
Route map
Zamoskvoretskaya line
Bolshaya Koltsevaya line
Location
- Location within Moscow Metro

Kashirskaya (Russian: Каширская) is a cross-platform station complex on the Moscow Metro. It was opened on 11 August 1969 as part of the Kakhovsky radius extension, and from 1984 was an interchange between the Kakhovskaya and the Orekhovskaya branches of the Zamoskvoretskaya line. Since 2022 it is officially classed as three stations after the Bolshaya Koltsevaya line's separation, and also is the terminus of it.

The stations was closed from 12 November 2022 to 1 March 2023 due to the reconstruction works.

== Layout and design ==
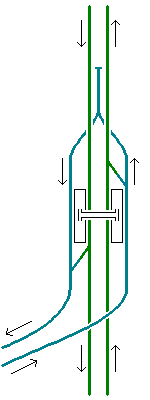
Diagram of the track layout (1990-s — 2020)

The station consists of two parallel halls of identical pillar-trispan (centipede) design typical of the 1960s stations. Decoratively the halls differ from each other no more than from any other centipede stations built at the time. The eastern hall work of architects Nikolay Demchinsky and Yuliya Kolesnikova, features a grey marble coat on the rectangular pillars, white ceramic tiles on the walls (with a black socle on the tracks) and red granite floor with an asphalt on the platform edge.

The western hall is identical except the pillars are faced with brown marble, the floor is laid with grey granite instead of red and the ceramic wall has a slightly indigo shade instead of pale white. (work of architects Nina Alyoshina and Nataliya Samoylova). The station's design focus comes from its name which is ultimately derived from the Kashira Hydroelectric Station located in Kashira and for the Moscow Engineering Physics Institute located nearby. Both halls feature large metallic artworks by Z.Vetrova based on the theme of electrification.

Since October 26, 2019 due to the abolition of the Kakhovskaya line, the station serves only the Zamoskvoretskaya line, the third and fourth routes do not work for passengers. In 2019, as part of the reconstruction of the Kakhovskaya line and its future inclusion in the Bolshaya Koltsevaya line, it is planned to replace the entire decoration of the two halls of the station. Their opening is planned as part of the Bolshaya Koltsevaya line in 2022.

From September 12, 2020, to January 25, 2021, trains on the Zamoskvoretskaya line do not stop at the platform from the center in connection with the construction of the Big Circle Line. Exits 1 and 2 are also closed. After finishing work, the platform will be closed to the center.

== Location ==
The station is located on a major transport artery in the south of Moscow, the intersection of the Andropova Avenue and the Kashirskoye Highway, both roads later become the M4 and M6 (European routes E115 and E119) respectively and continue to the Russian south. The station is also situated on a point where two Moscow's districts meet up: Nagatino-Sadovniki and Moskvorechye-Saburovo.

As a result, from its opening it was prone to a large passenger traffic, particularly prior to the opening of the Orekhovo branch. To deal with this the station's entrance designs were altered from the usual underground vestibules to two surface ones (architect M.Fainshteina) which also double as a transfer point between the halls. For a more direct transfer there is also a central passage with a staircase out of the middle of the platform directly linking the two halls.

One of the main reasons why the Kakhovskaya line was split off from the Zamoskovoretskaya was the track layout. In 1969 both platforms were opened with one track used on each one. In 1983 the extension to Orekhovo only continued the unused tracks without making provisions for a comfortable branch service. The result was that only the northbound platform offered cross-platform interchange, which was unnecessary as the tracks would join anyway (see diagram). The southbound tracks branched only after the station, and the passengers wishing to change the direction of the travel had to wait for the correct train on one side of the platform. (The ratio was 1:1 initially and 2:1 after the Orekhovo branch expanded to Krasnogvardeyskaya in 1985).

There were varying proposals to solve the problem, including building a second junction prior to the southbound platform, but this would have been impossible without any disruption to the service, an alternative scenario including switching the whole line from right to left-hand side travel, but this was also dropped out of practical reasons, one of which was that all of the Russian Metro trains had driver doors on the left only.

The solution was to separate the Kakhovskaya branch into a separate line which took place on 20 November 1995 a reversal (turnback) siding was built north of the station allowing for the Kakhovskaya Line to separate. However, as the siding was built next to the Kolomenskoye Nature Reserve, environmental groups insisted it does not extend into it. This forced the siding to be slightly shorter, enough to accommodate the six car train of the Kakhovskaya Line but not long enough for the eight car train of the Zamoskvoretskaya Line.

== Bolshaya Koltsevaya line ==
The tracks of the Kakhovskaya line were extended as part of the future ring project Bolshaya Koltsevaya line. The actual path was disputed and the variation was either eastwards to Bratislavskaya and then to follow the path of the Lyublinsko-Dmitrovskaya line to Pechatniki or directly to Pechatniki via a more northeast path (both featuring at least one interim station). Bratislavskaya had already a provision for the future transfer set in its ensemble, but Pechatniki was chosen.

== Gallery ==
=== Before reconstruction ===
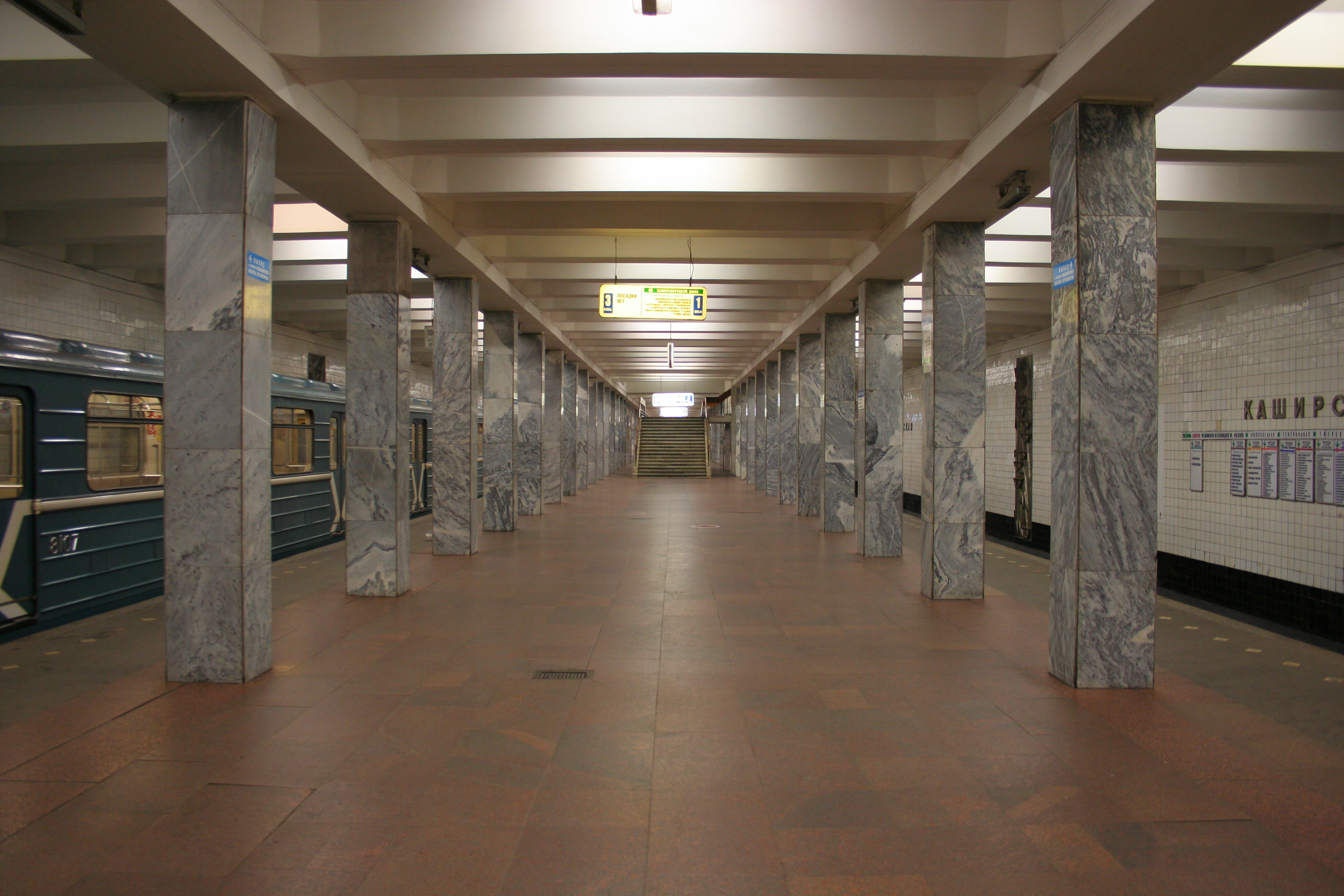
Eastern hall (in 2010)

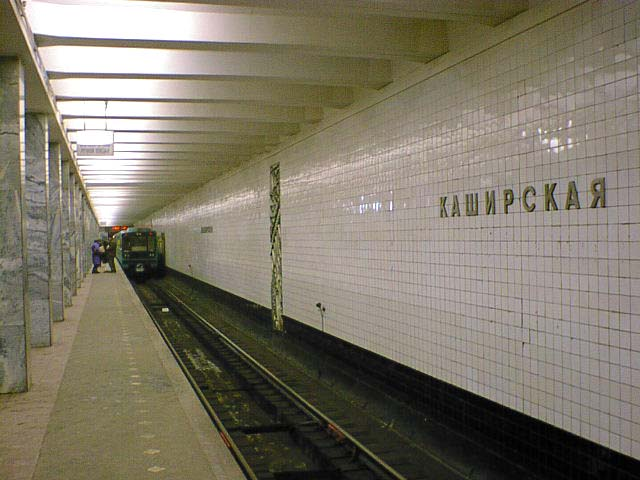
Eastern hall platform (for terminating Kakhovskaya Line and northbound Zamoskvoretskaya Line trains)

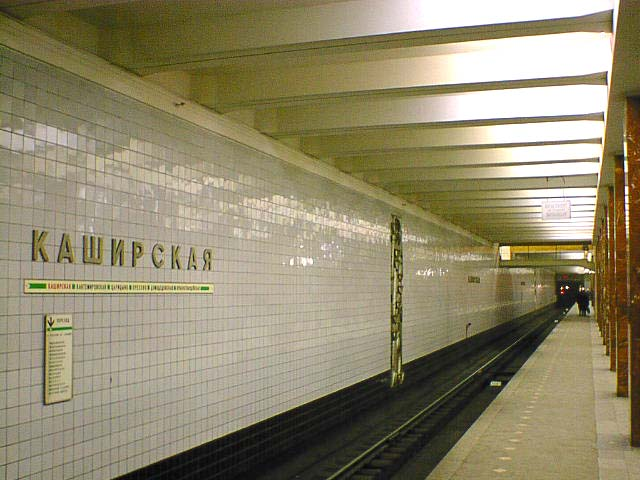
Western hall platform (for southbound Zamoskvoretskaya Line trains)

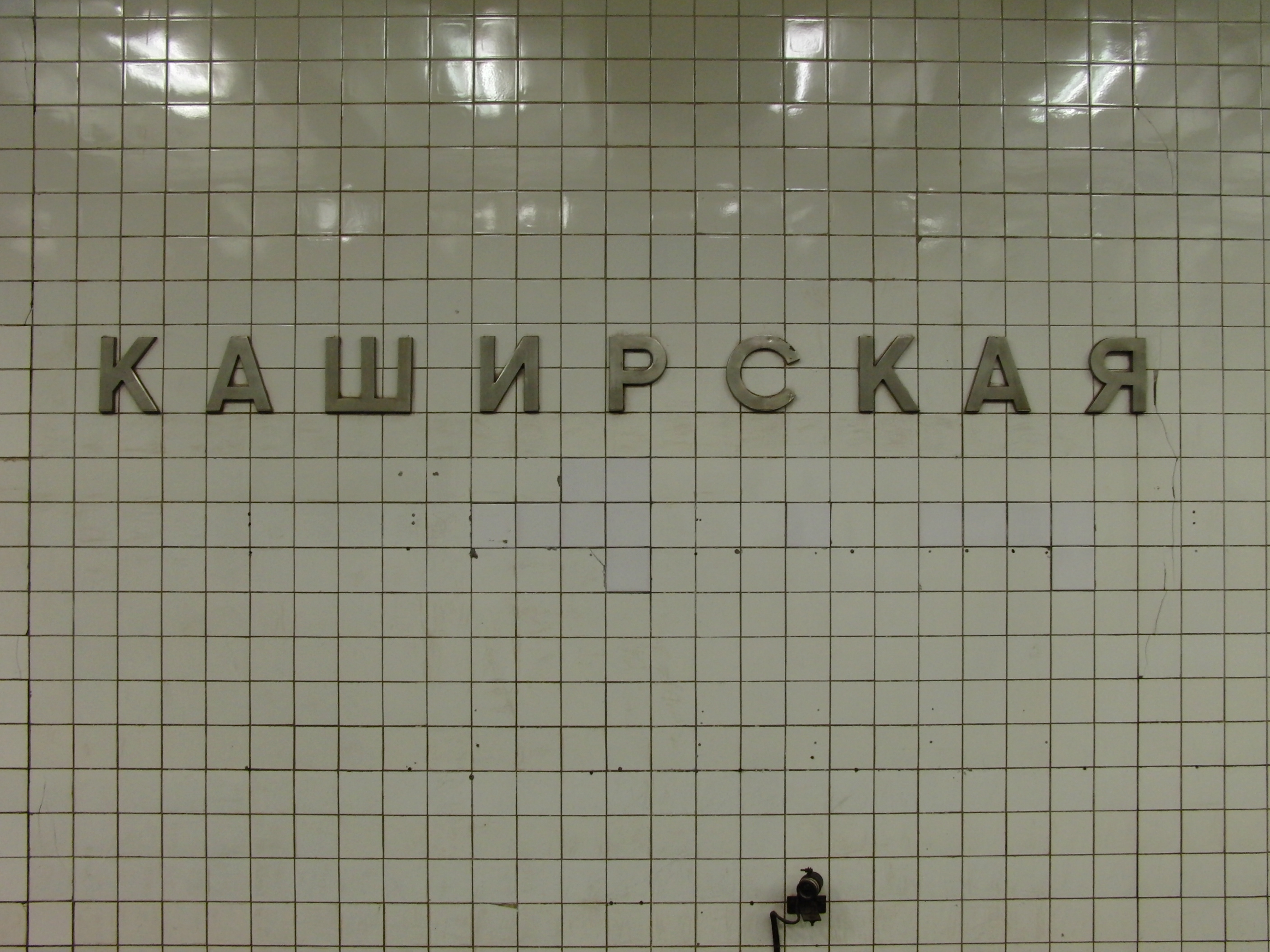
Station artwork

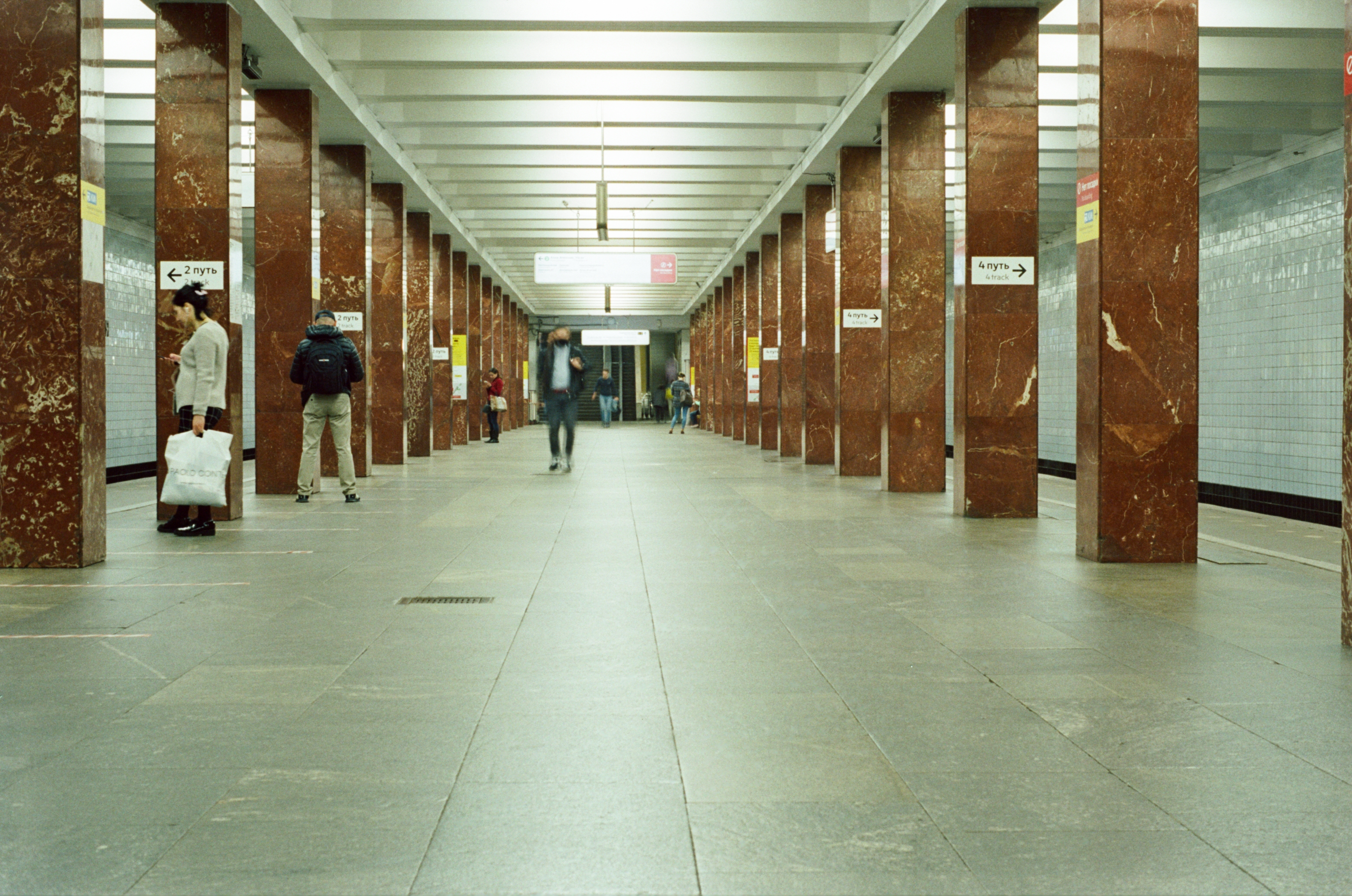
Interior of southbound hall (2020)

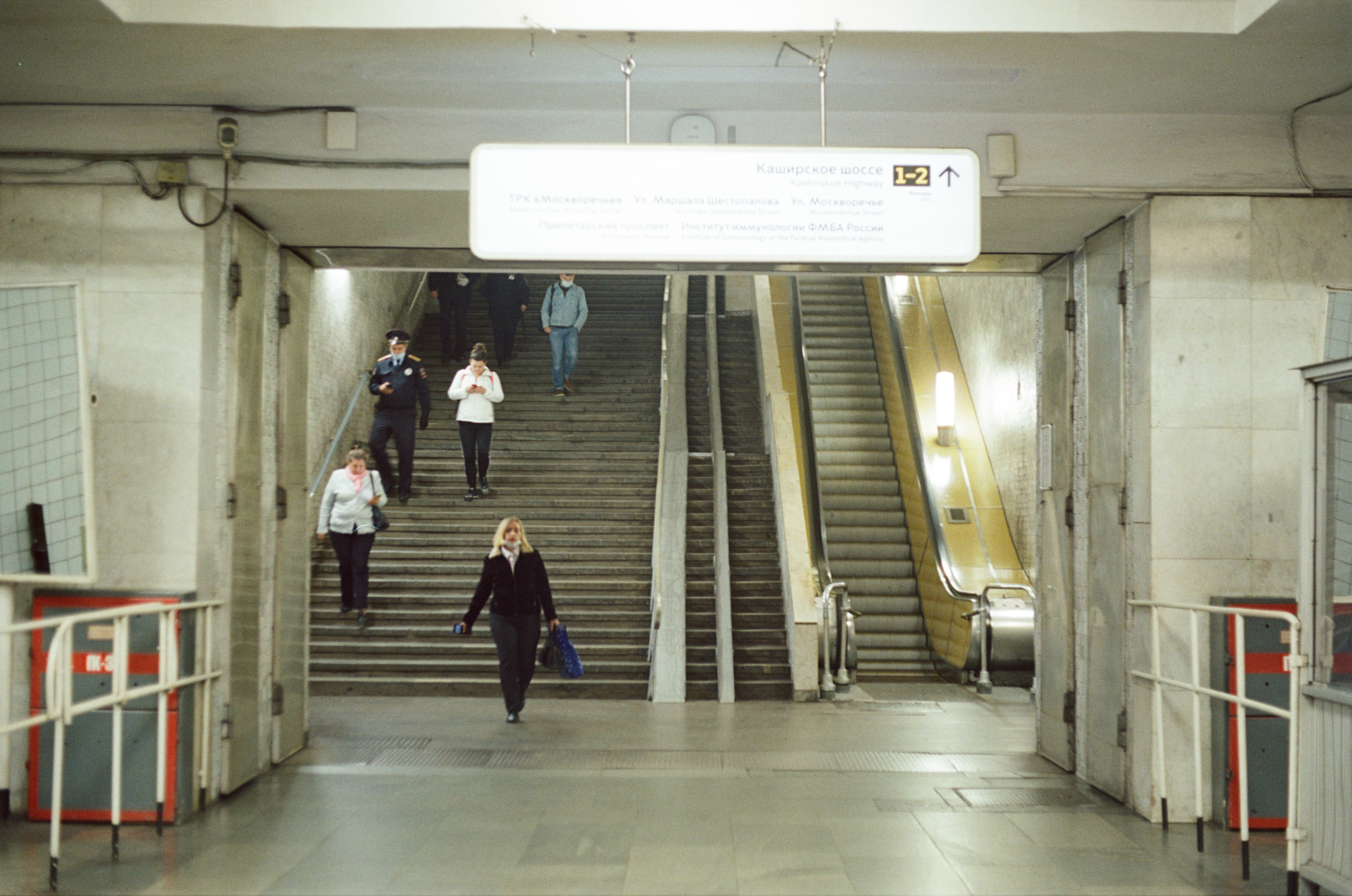
Southbound stairs (2020)

=== During reconstruction ===
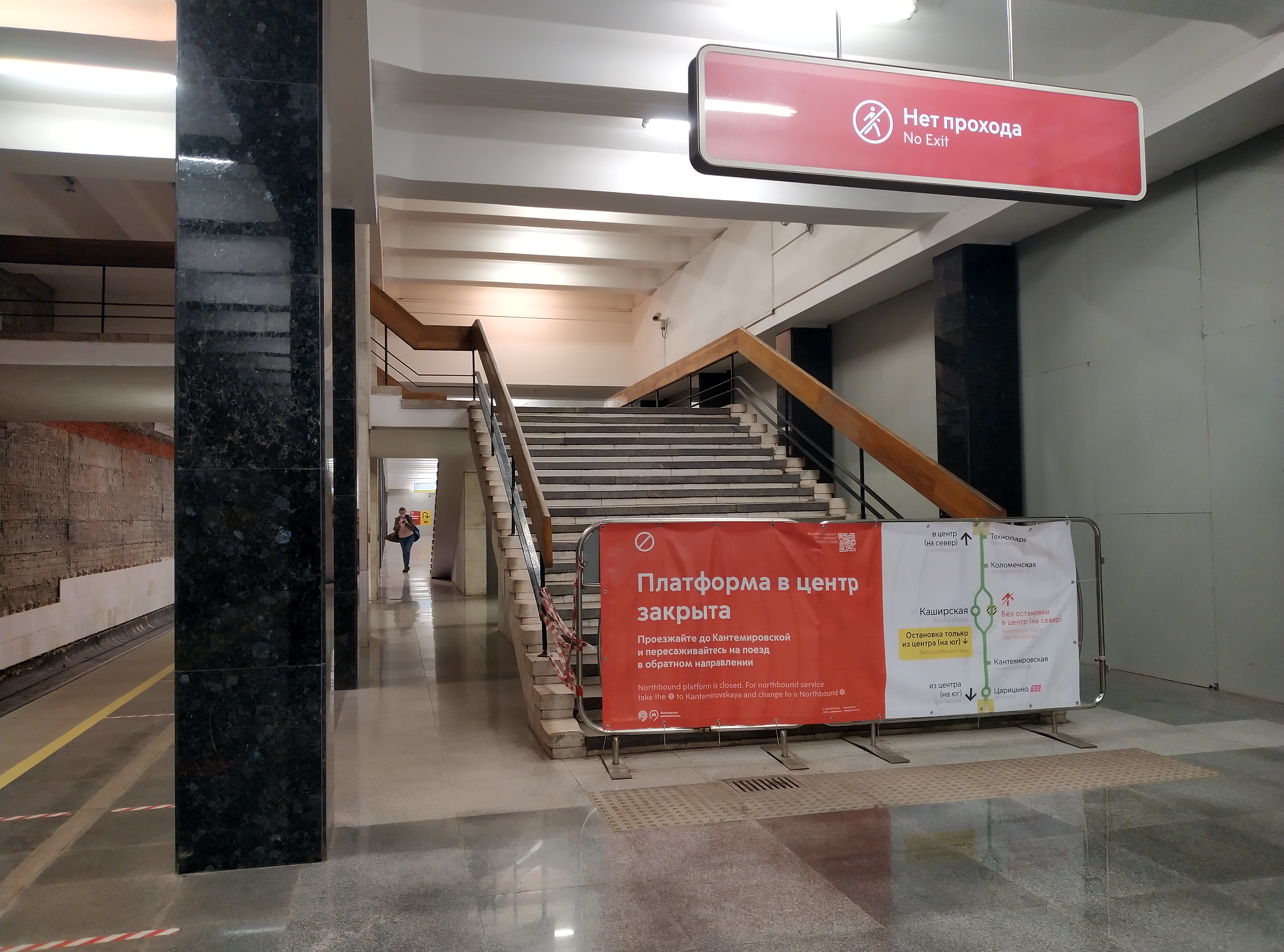
Southbound platform with temporary walls separated construction half of platform (2021)

=== After reconstruction ===
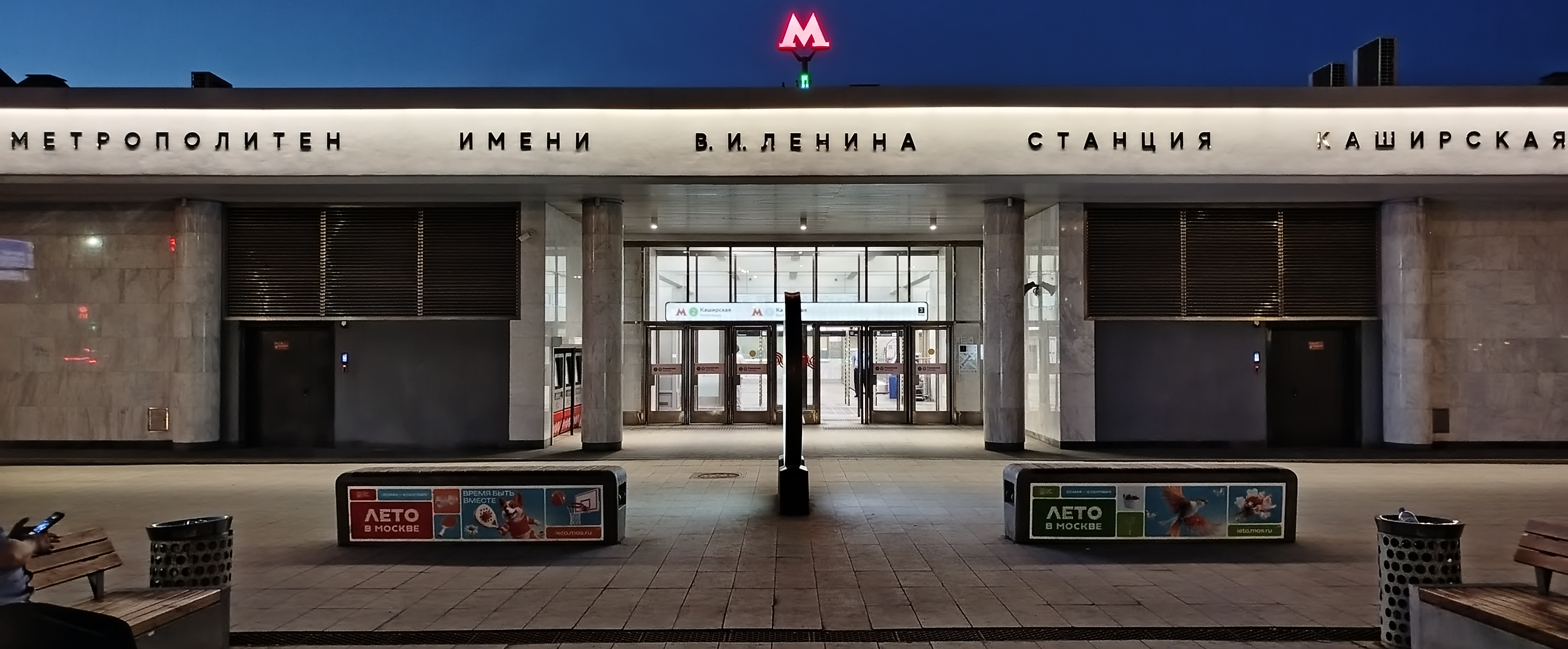
Northern vestibule of Kashirskaya at dusk (2026)
