= Nagatinsky Zaton (Moscow Metro) =

Prospective Moscow Metro station

Nagatinsky Zaton Нагатинский затон
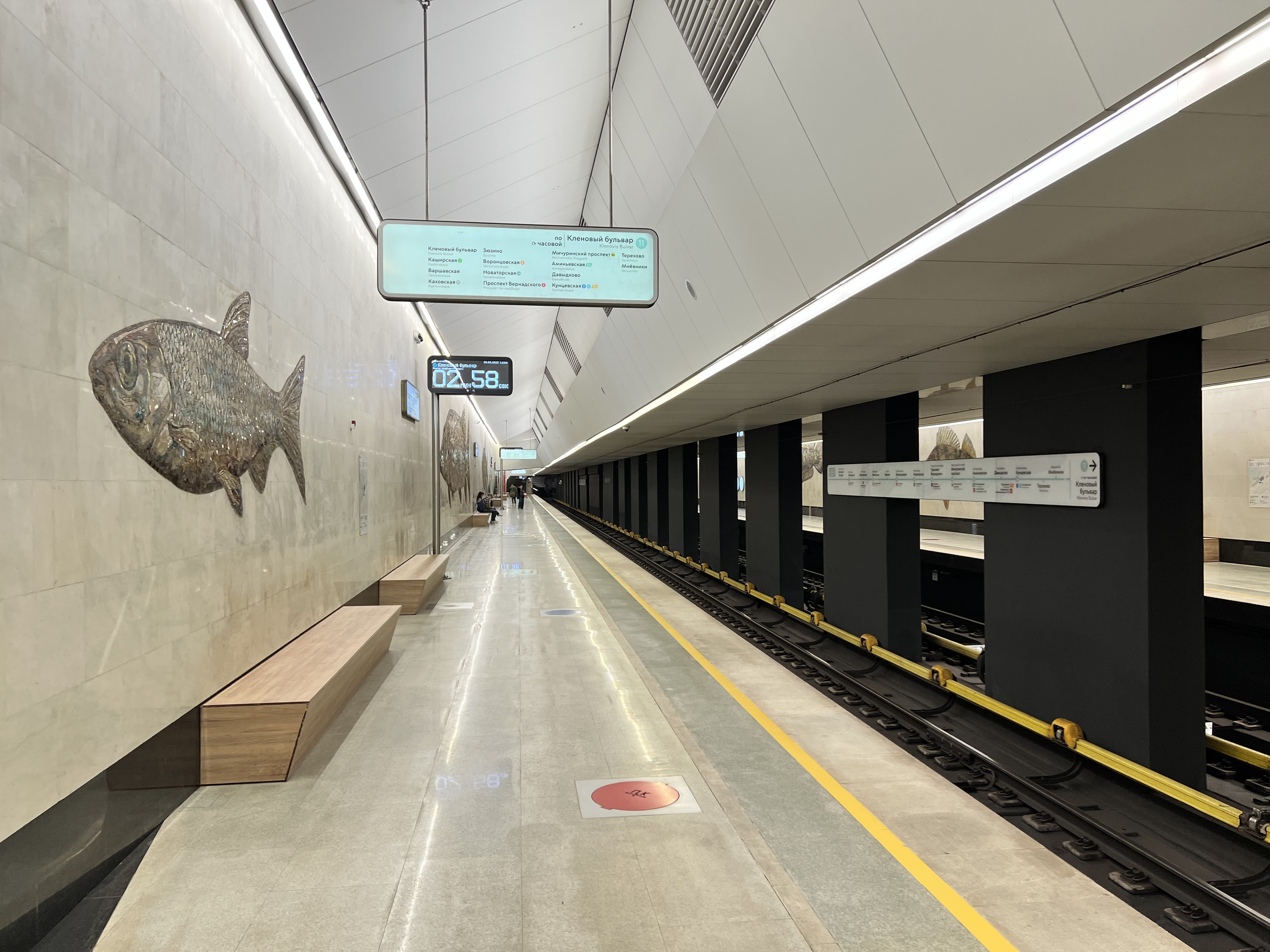

General information
- Location: Nagatinsky Zaton District, Southern Administrative Okrug; Moscow; Russia
- Coordinates: 55.6845°N 37.7050°E
- System: Moscow Metro station
- Owner: Moskovsky Metropoliten
- Line: Bolshaya Koltsevaya line

History
- Opened: 1 March 2023

Services
Preceding station	Moscow Metro	Following station
Pechatniki anticlockwise / outer	Bolshaya Koltsevaya line	Klenovy Bulvar clockwise / inner
Route map
Bolshaya Koltsevaya line
Location
- Location within Moscow Metro

Nagatinsky Zaton (Russian: Нагатинский затон, lit. 'Nagatino bay') is a metro station on the Bolshaya Koltsevaya line of the Moscow Metro, between Klenovy Bulvar and Pechatniki. The name of the station derives from Nagatinsky Zaton District where it is located. The station was opened on 1 March 2023. The construction started in 2017.

The station is notable for its mosaics depicting fish found in the nearby Moscow River. These designs are inspired by a 1st-century Roman mosaic of a fish, now exhibited at the State Historical Museum, Moscow.

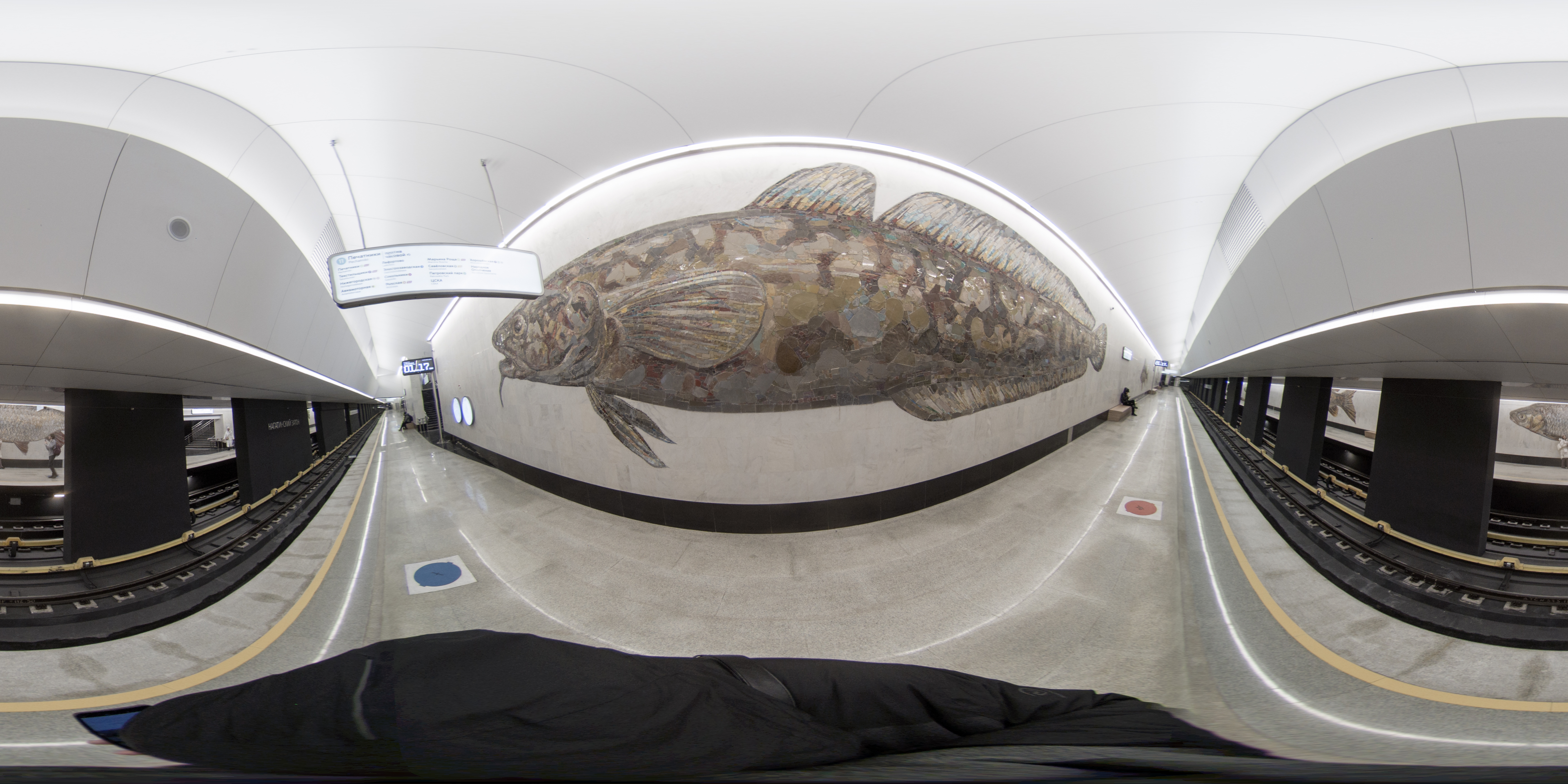
Nagatinsky Zaton station hall (view as a 360° interactive panorama)
