= Kakhovskaya line =

Moscow Metro line

Bolshaya Koltsevaya line

Overview
- Native name: Каховская линия
- Owner: Moskovsky Metropoliten
- Locale: Moscow
- Stations: 3 (closed)

Service
- Type: Rapid transit
- System: Moscow Metro
- Operator: Moskovsky Metropoliten
- Rolling stock: 81-717/714

History
- Opened: 11 August 1969
- Closed: 26 October 2019

Technical
- Line length: 3.3 kilometres (2.1 mi)
- Character: Underground
- Track gauge: 1,520 mm (4 ft 11 27/32 in)
- Electrification: Third rail

The Kakhovskaya line (Russian: Кахо́вская ли́ния, IPA: [kɐˈxofskəjə ˈlʲinʲɪjə]) (Line 11A, formerly Line 11) is an abolished line of the Moscow Metro. Although the line was formed in 1995, all of the stations date to 1969 when they opened as part of the Zamoskvoretskaya line. The Kakhovskaya line was the only conventional line that lacked a full transfer to the ring line. It was also the shortest line in the system of only 3.3 kilometres (2.1 mi) in length and had only three stations.

== History ==
The history of this small line begins in the Moscow urban development plan that was adopted in the early 1960s. The plan focused on extending the Zamoskvoretsky radius of the then Gorkovsko–Zamoskvoretskaya line (GZL) to the south. Using the ideal of simplified singular architectural pillar-trispan station design (sorokonozhka) that was prominent at the time, construction began in the mid 1960s of extending the Metro past the Kolomenskoye nature reserve and Nagatino industrial zone up to the station of Kashirskaya and then splitting into two directions – one into the rapidly growing districts of Saburovo and Zyuzino and the other one into the future districts of Orekhovo and Borisovo. The former branch was to open as part of the extension and would feature a new depot, whilst the second branch would remain in perspective for a decade more as the districts were being built. It was the feature of the first (Kakhovskaya) branch that made the whole line appear dissimilar to the standard tangential layout that Moscow Metro radii followed.

Although it was a practical reason, as the stations of the Kakhovskaya line connect three major transport arteries – the Kashira Highway which continues on to become the M4 (E111) motorway going southwards to Rostov-on-Don and the Caucasus; and the Varshavskoye Highway, which splits into A130 highway going to Roslavl and Belarus & M2 (E105) motorway heading towards Kharkiv and Crimea. Furthermore, the line also provides connections to the Paveletsky suburban railway line. Thereby, the unorthodox layout was justified in its transport importance. In addition most of the residents who were settled in the districts which the line expanded into were families of workers of the Likhachev Factory Plant (ZiL), the largest in Moscow, who aided the construction of the Metro so that the residents would have a direct transport to work via Avtozavodskaya station. However the most inspiring reasons of all would be the actual development plan itself rather than the practical reasons. The plan had a very ambitious project that coincided with the traditional radial layout of Moscow - to feature a second parallel ring that would allow passengers to bypass the city centre altogether, and in the future the stations of the Kakhovskaya line would become part of it.

The line formally opened in August 1969 and for more than a decade the operation was continuous. However, by the early 1980s the future districts of Orekhovo and Zyablikovo were actively growing and were in desperate need of a Metro, thus construction began on the second branch. However the original idea was that upon the completion of the second, longer Kakhovsky branch, would close and remain closed until the large ring would be complete. On December 30, 1984 the Orekhovo branch was opened and the Kakhovsky branch was set to close, but the very next day, on December 31, Orekhovo branch had to close due to a major flood in the new tunnel. While the tunnel, forced the closure of the new stations, ZiL urged the city authorities not to close the shorter Orekhovo branch for the time being and instead operate the southern part of the line on a branched basis with 2:1 train arrangement (two consecutive trains going to Krasnogvardeyskaya followed by a single train going to Kakhovskaya).

This, however, created a number of problems. One was the track arrangement at Kashirskaya where the southbound trains directions' separate only after the station, not before, thus preventing proper use of the cross-platform ability. Moreover, the new branch to Orekhovo resulted in massive rise of passengers, and the insufficiency of trains on Orekhovo branch was putting extra pressure on the system. In early 1995, construction was completed on the reversal sidings behind Kashirskaya and finally the Kakhovskaya branch was separated into a separate line. This took place on August 11, 1995.

Since March 2019, the line has been closed temporarily for construction of the connection with phase 2 of Bolshaya Koltsevaya line from Kashirskaya to Mnyovniki. The Kakhovskaya line was integrated into and is operated as the part of the Bolshaya Koltsevaya line since March 2023.

=== Timeline ===
Segment	Date opened	Length(km)
Avtozavodskaya-Kakhovskaya	1969-08-11	9.5 km
Separation into separate line	1995-11-20	6.1 km*
Total:	3 Stations	3.4 km

* Prior to 1995 and was integral part of Zamoskvoretskaya line

== Transfers ==
#	Transfer to	At
2	Zamoskvoretskaya line	Kashirskaya
Rail	Paveletskoye direction	Varshavskaya
9	Serpukhovsko-Timiryazevskaya line	Kakhovskaya

== Rolling stock ==
The line shared the Zamoskvoretskoye depot (№ 7) with the Zamoskvoretskaya line, and four 81-717/714.
