= Klenovy Bulvar (Bolshaya Koltsevaya line) =

Prospective Moscow Metro station

Klenovy Bulvar Кленовый бульвар
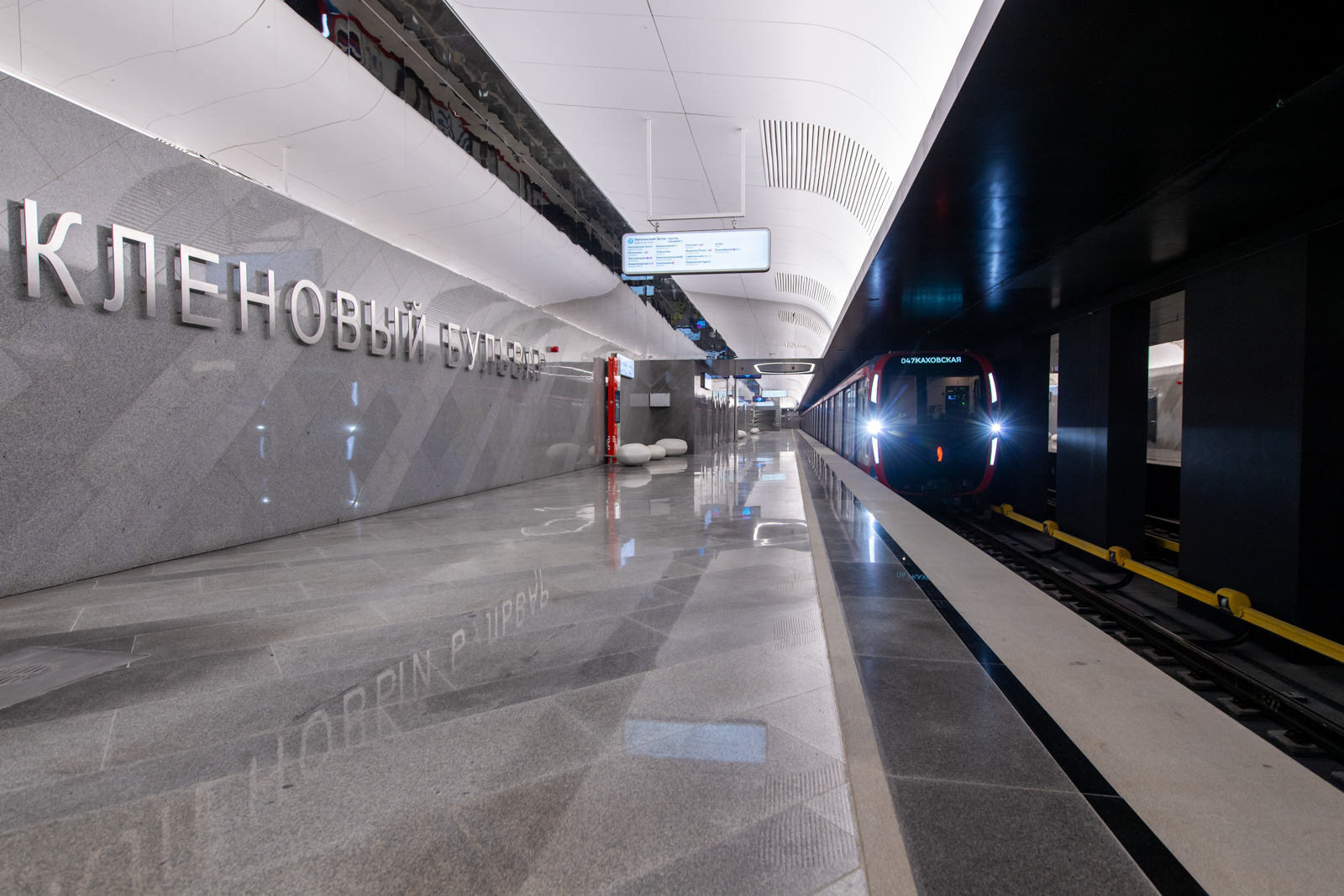
- Station platform

General information
- Location: Nagatinsky Zaton District, Southern Administrative Okrug; Moscow; Russia
- Coordinates: 55.6755°N 37.6846°E
- System: Moscow Metro station
- Owner: Moskovsky Metropoliten
- Line: Bolshaya Koltsevaya line

History
- Opened: 1 March 2023

Services
Preceding station	Moscow Metro	Following station
Nagatinsky Zaton anticlockwise / outer	Bolshaya Koltsevaya line	Kashirskaya clockwise / inner
Route map
Bolshaya Koltsevaya line
Location
- Location within Moscow Metro

Klenovy Bulvar (Russian: Кленовый бульвар, lit. 'Maple Boulevard') is a metro station on the Bolshaya Koltsevaya line of the Moscow Metro, between Kashirskaya and Nagatinsky Zaton. The name of the station derives from Klenovy Boulevard as it is located at the junction of between Kolomenskaya Street and Klenovy Boulevard. The station was opened on 1 March 2023. The construction started in 2017.

In 2027, the station is planned to have a transfer to the Biryulyovskaya line.
