= Tekstilshchiki (Bolshaya Koltsevaya line) =

Prospective Moscow Metro station

Coordinates: 55.7084°N 37.7283°E

Tekstilshchiki Текстильщики
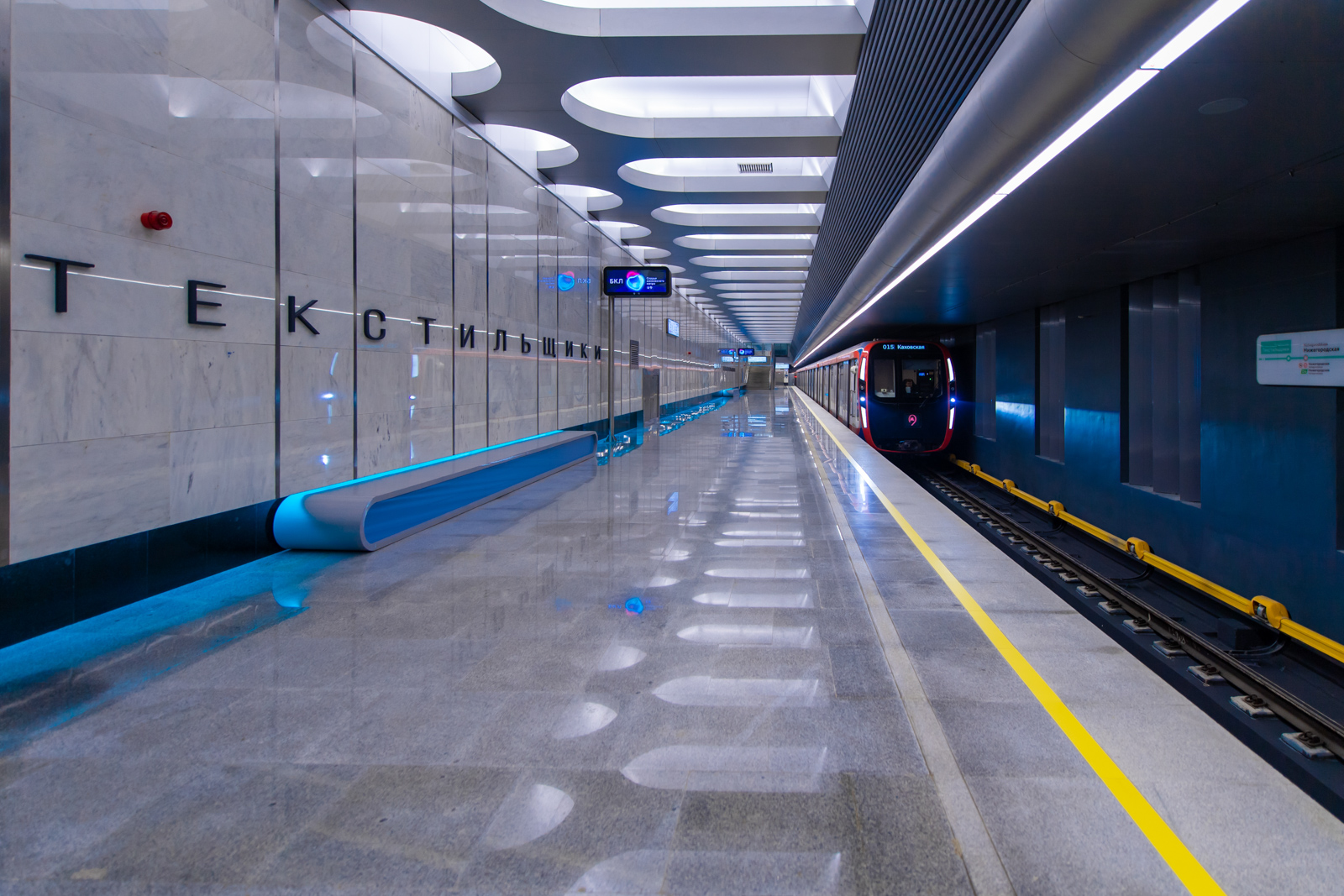

General information
- Location: Moscow; Russia
- System: Moscow Metro station
- Owner: Moskovsky Metropoliten
- Line: Bolshaya Koltsevaya line

Construction
- Accessible: yes

History
- Opened: 1 March 2023

Services
Preceding station	Moscow Metro	Following station
Nizhegorodskaya anticlockwise / outer	Bolshaya Koltsevaya line	Pechatniki clockwise / inner
Volgogradsky Prospekt towards Planernaya	Tagansko-Krasnopresnenskaya line transfer at Tekstilshchiki	Kuzminki towards Kotelniki
Location
- Location within Moscow Metro

Tekstilshchiki is a station on the Bolshaya Koltsevaya line of the Moscow Metro. It was opened on March 1, 2023.

The transfer to the Tagansko-Krasnopresnenskaya line station of the same name was opened on May 2, 2025.

== Gallery ==
Construction of Tekstilshchiki (Bolshaya Koltsevaya line), as of October 2020

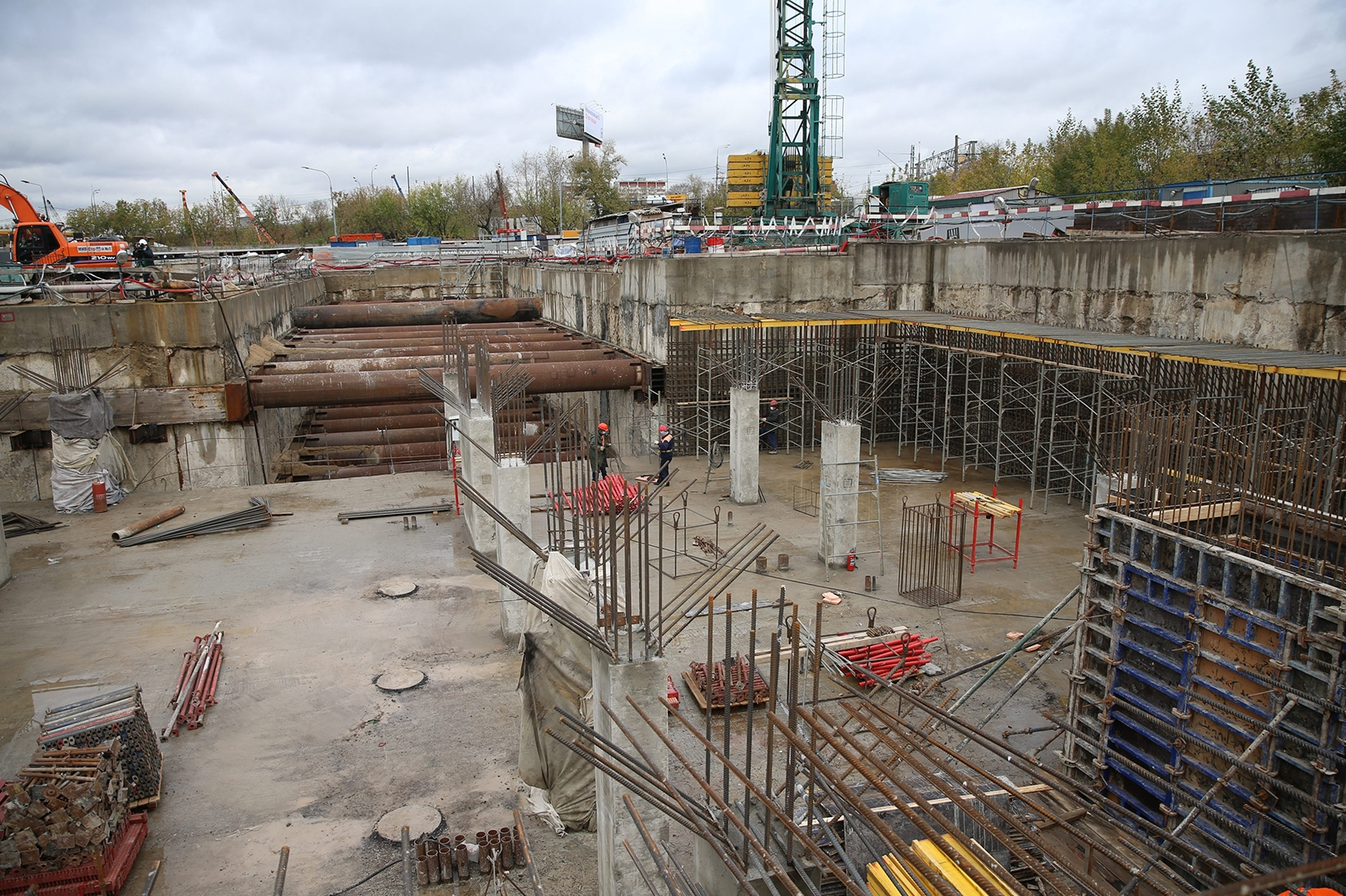

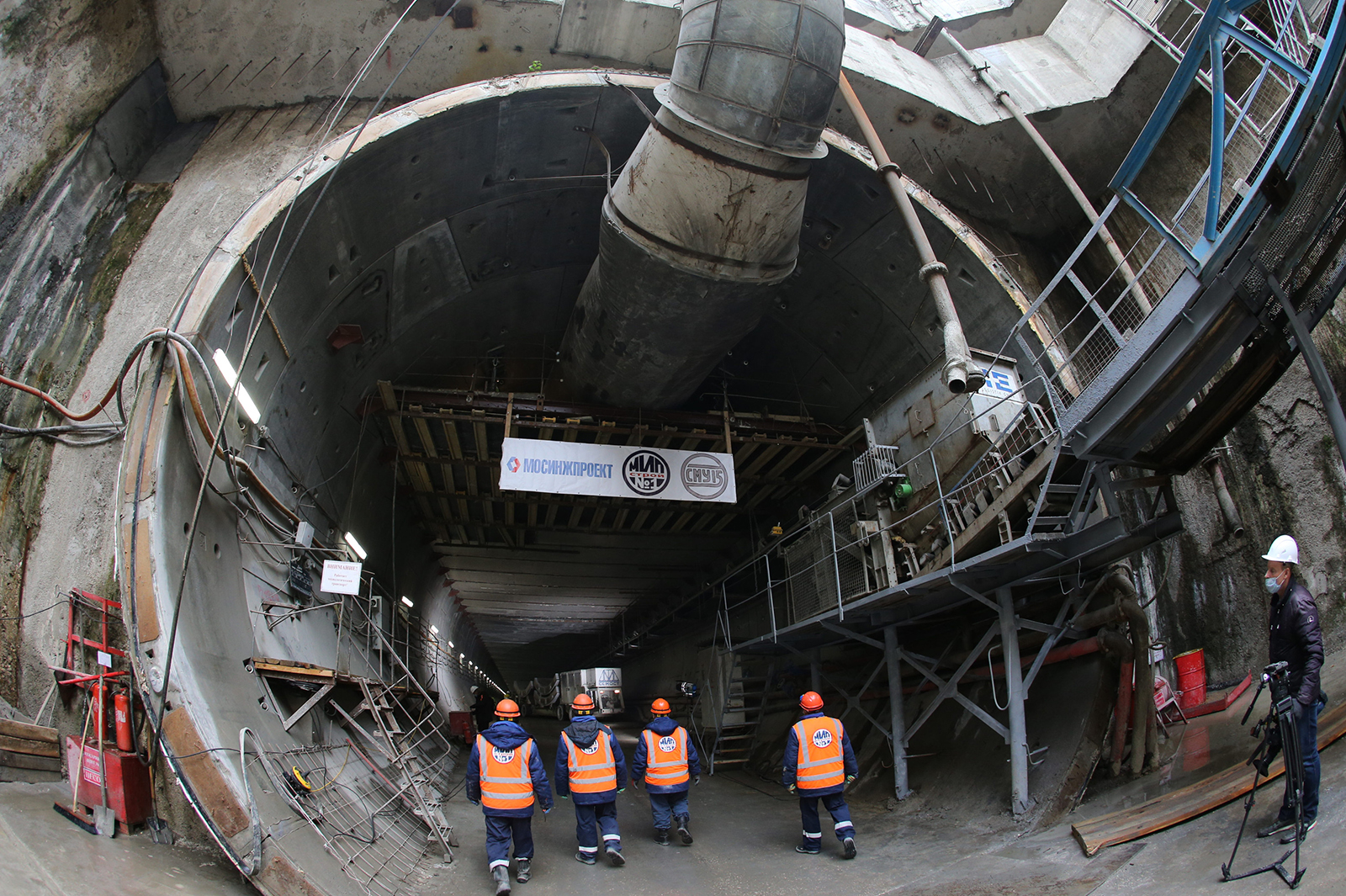

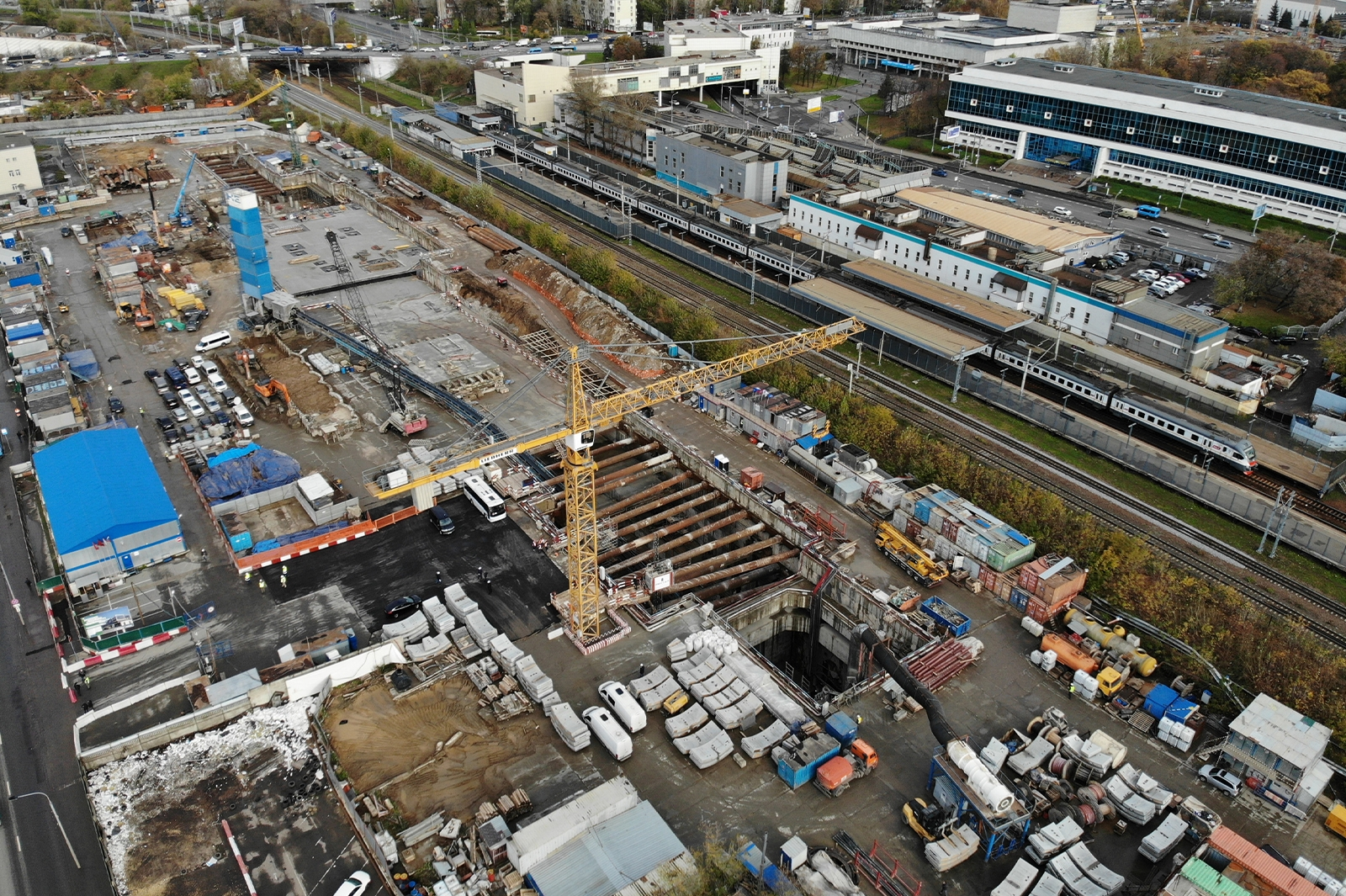
