= Pechatniki District =

District in federal city of Moscow

Pechatniki District район Печатники (Russian)
- District
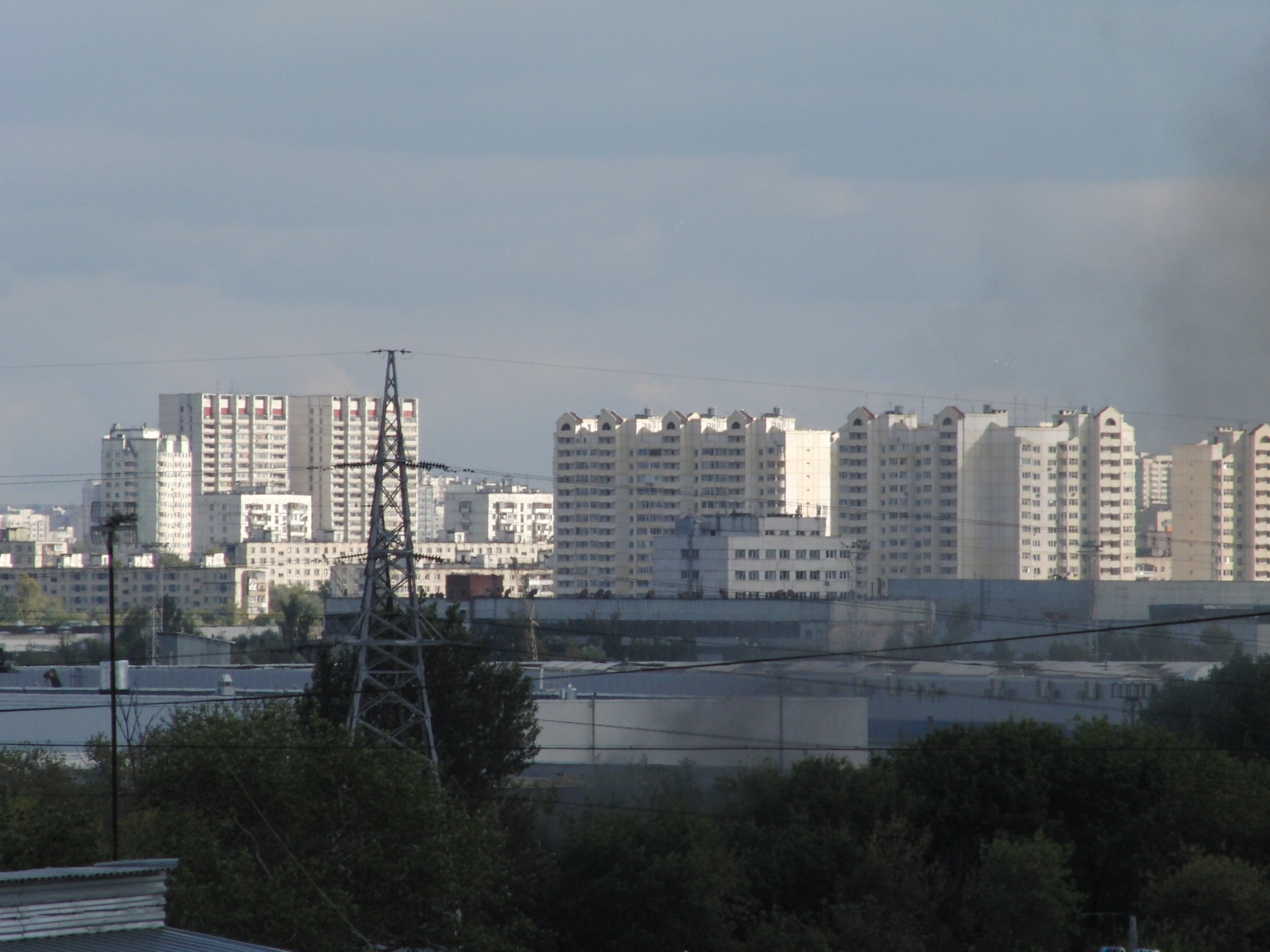
- View of Pechatniki District

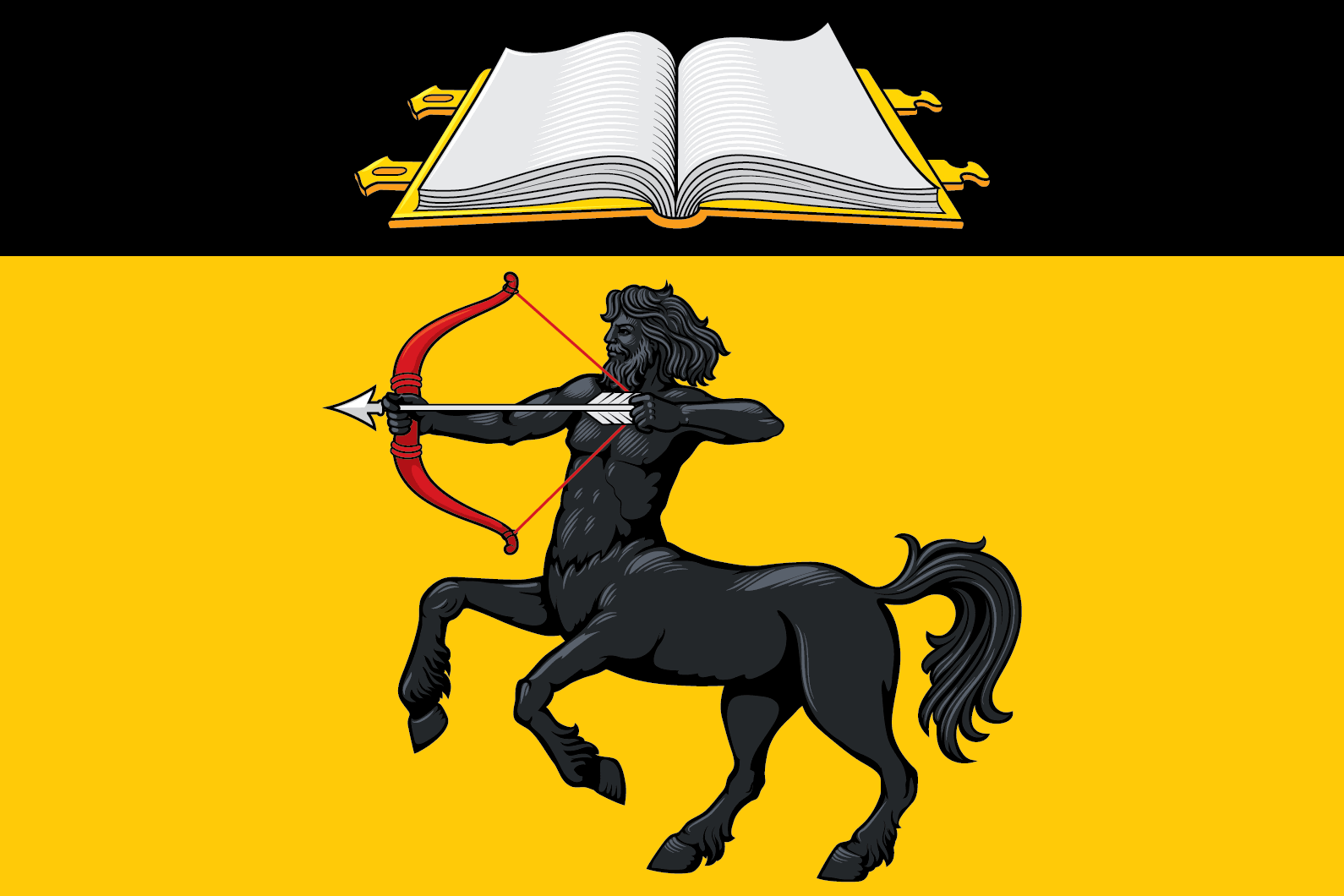
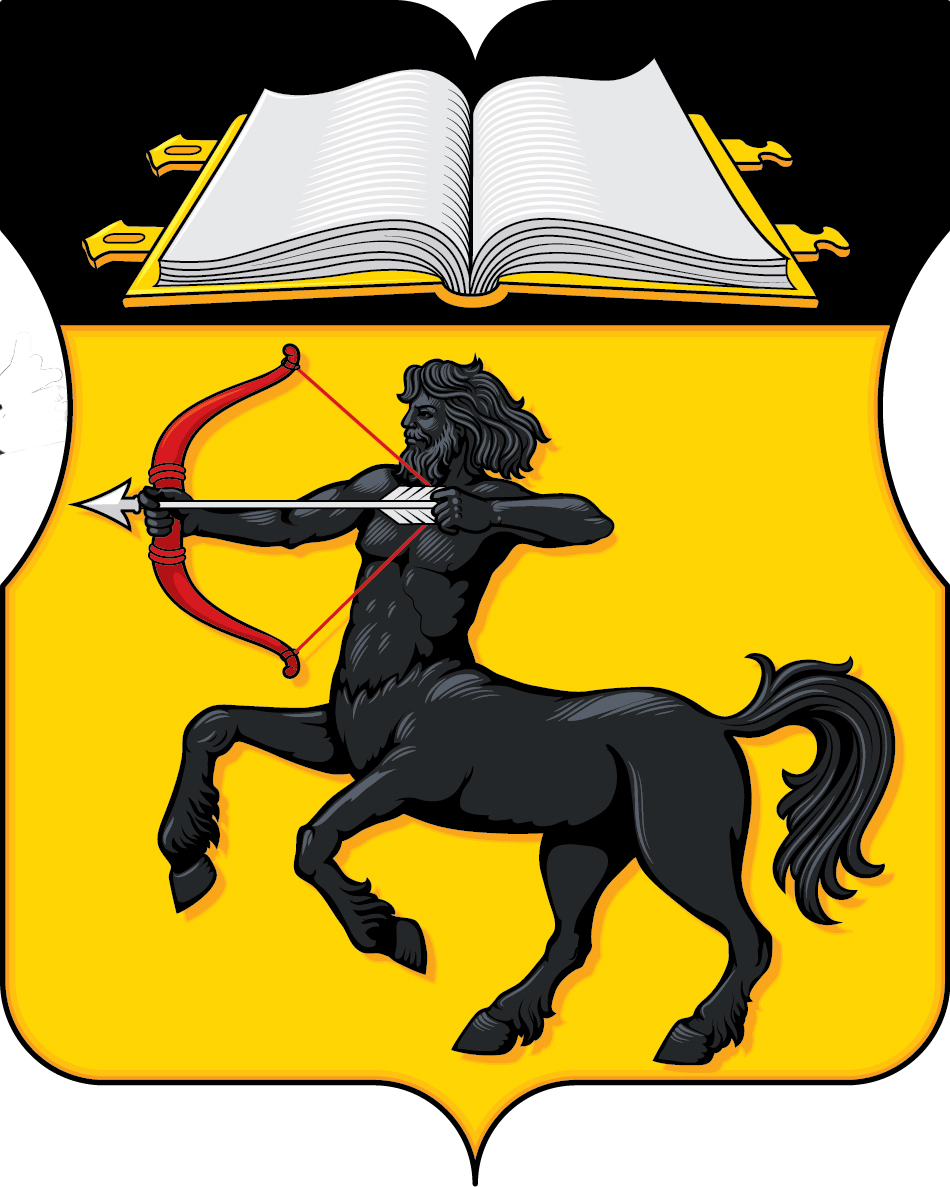
- Flag Coat of arms
- Location of Pechatniki District in Moscow (pre-2012 map)
- Coordinates: 55°42′N 37°43′E
- Country: Russia
- Federal subject: federal city of Moscow

Population (2010 Census)
  - Total: 83,403

Municipal structure
  - Municipally incorporated as: Pechatniki Municipal Okrug
- Time zone: UTC+
- OKTMO ID: 45393000
- Website: http://pechatniki.mos.ru

Population of Pechatniki District
- 2010 Census: 83,403
- 2002 Census: 71,383

Pechatniki District (Russian: райо́н Печа́тники) is an administrative district (raion), one of the twelve in South-Eastern Administrative Okrug of the federal city of Moscow, Russia. As of the 2010 Census, the total population of the district was 83,403.

== Municipal status ==
As a municipal division, it is incorporated as Pechatniki Municipal Okrug.
