= Solntsevo (Moscow Metro) =

Moscow Metro station

Solntsevo Солнцево
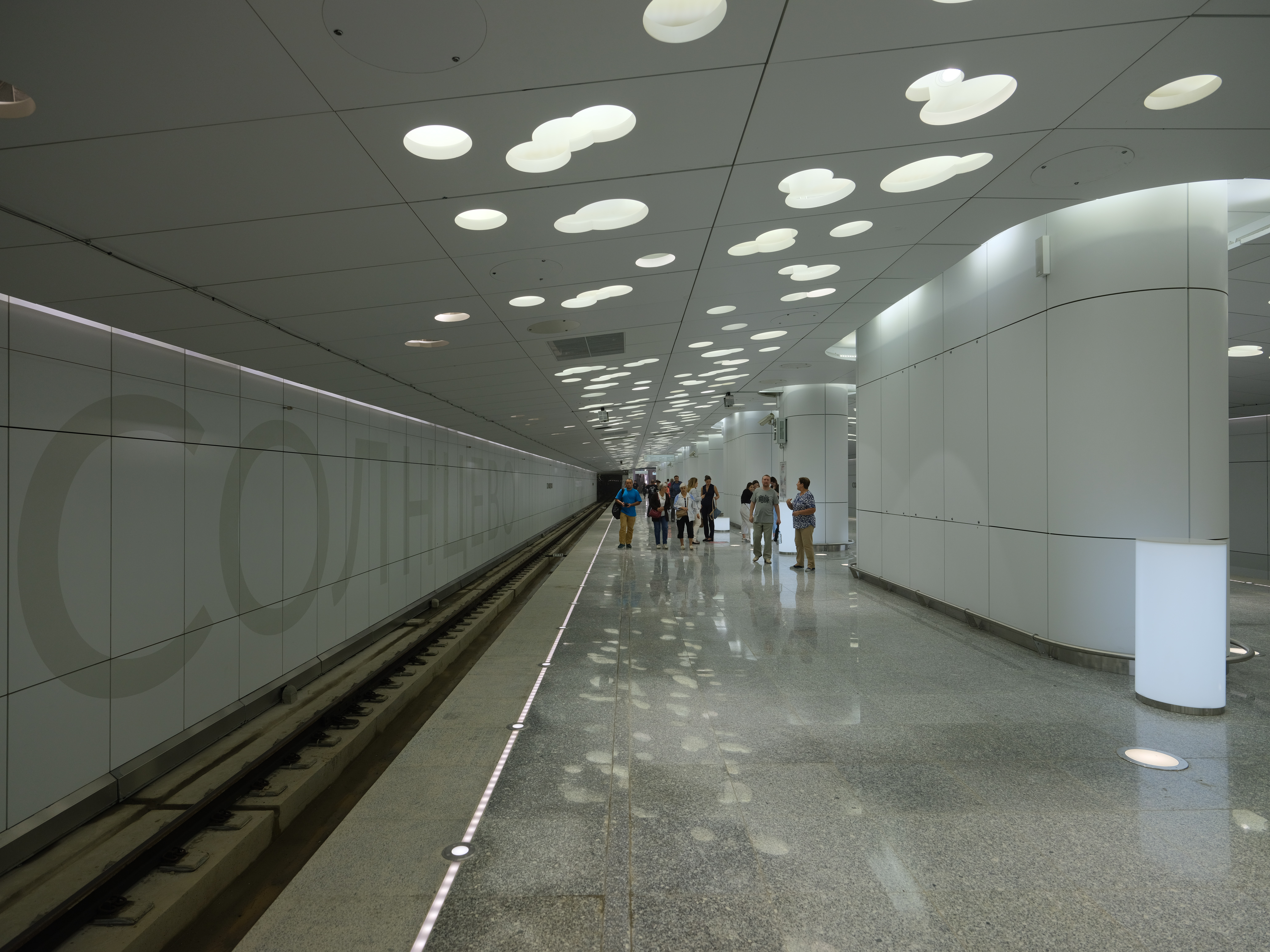

General information
- Location: Solntsevo District, Western Administrative Okrug; Moscow; Russia
- Coordinates: 55.6497°N 37.3911°E
- System: Moscow Metro station
- Owner: Moskovsky Metropoliten
- Line: Solntsevskaya line
- Platforms: 1 island platform

Construction
- Structure type: Three-span shallow-column station
- Platform levels: 1

History
- Opened: 30 August 2018

Services
Preceding station	Moscow Metro	Following station
Borovskoye Shosse towards Aeroport Vnukovo	Kalininsko-Solntsevskaya line (Solntsevsky radius)	Govorovo towards Delovoy Tsentr
Route map
Kalininskaya line
Location
- Location within Moscow Metro

Solntsevo (Russian: Солнцево) is a station on the Kalininsko-Solntsevskaya line of the Moscow Metro. It opened On August 30, 2018, as part of line's Ramenki-Rasskazovka extension.

The station is in the Solntsevo District of Moscow. The name Solntsevo dates to 1938 when a dacha community was built on the site. Solntsevo was absorbed by the city of Moscow in 1984.

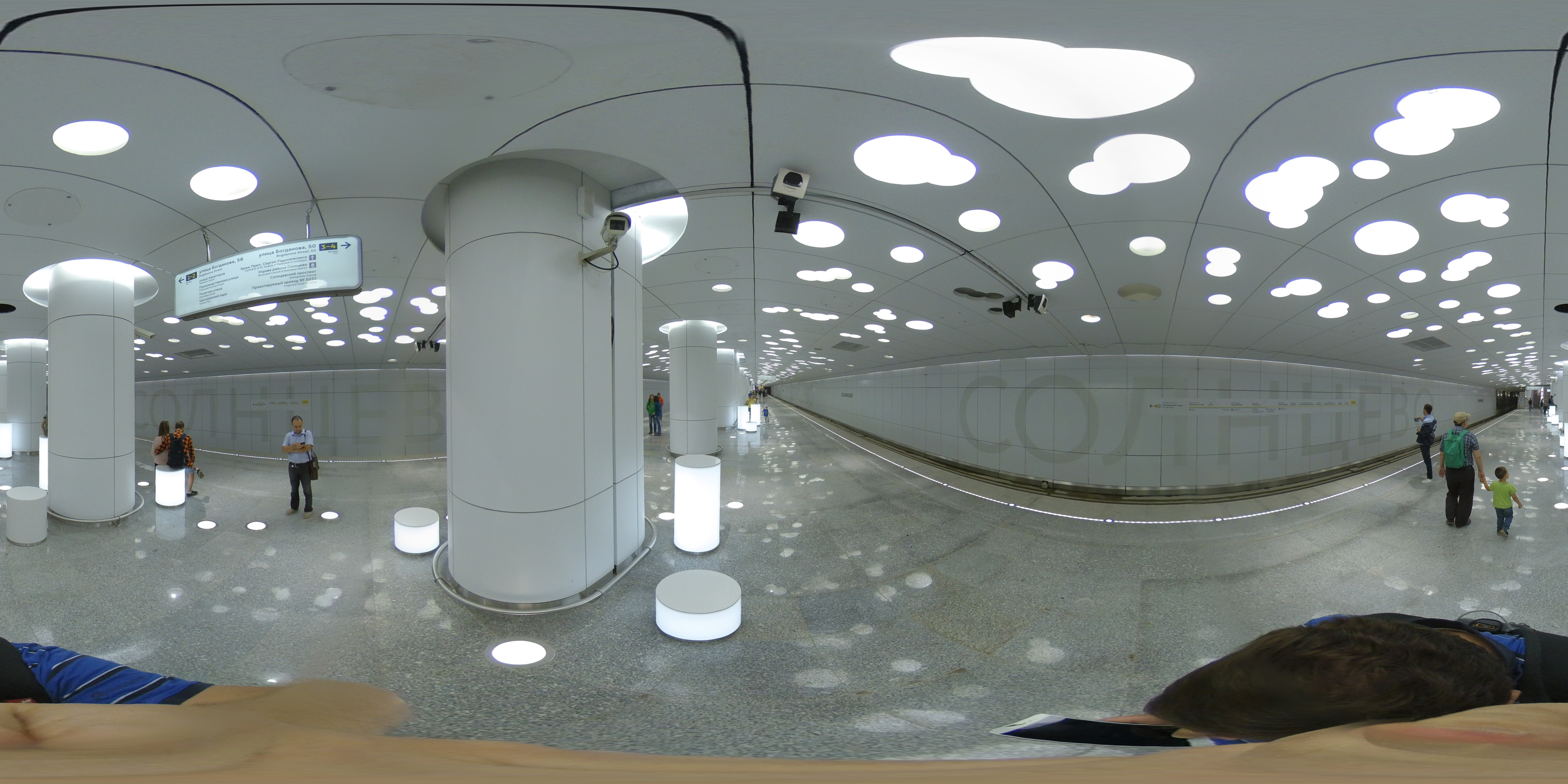
Solntsevo station main hall (view as a 360° interactive panorama)
