= Michurinsky Prospekt (Kalininsko-Solntsevskaya line) =

Moscow Metro station

Michurinsky Prospekt Мичуринский проспект
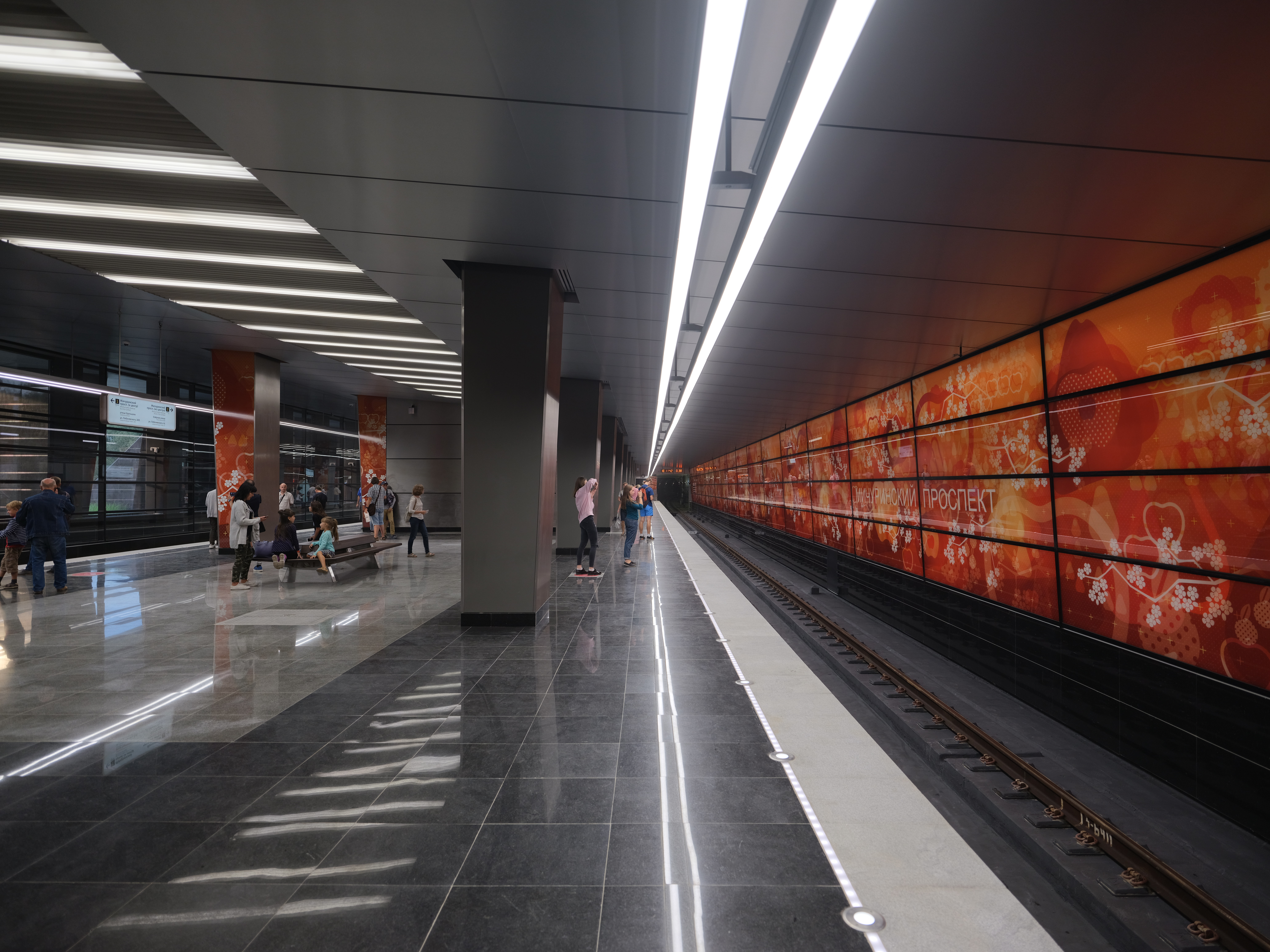

General information
- Location: Ramenki District, Western Administrative Okrug; Moscow; Russia
- Coordinates: 55.689444°N 37.485°E
- System: Moscow Metro station
- Owner: Moskovsky Metropoliten
- Lines: Solntsevskaya line Bolshaya Koltsevaya line (planned)
- Platforms: 1 island platform on the Kalininsko-Solntsevskaya line

Construction
- Structure type: Three-span shallow-column station

History
- Opened: 30 August 2018

Services
Preceding station	Moscow Metro	Following station
Ozyornaya towards Aeroport Vnukovo	Kalininsko-Solntsevskaya line (Solntsevsky radius)	Ramenki towards Delovoy Tsentr
Prospekt Vernadskogo anticlockwise / outer	Bolshaya Koltsevaya line transfer at Michurinsky Prospekt	Aminyevskaya clockwise / inner
Route map
Kalininskaya line
Location
- Location within Moscow Metro

Michurinsky Prospekt (Russian: Мичуринский проспект) is a station on the Kalininsko-Solntsevskaya line of the Moscow Metro, it opened on 30 August 2018 as part of line's "Ramenki" - "Rasskazovka" extension.

It has a connection to Michurinsky Prospekt on the Bolshaya Koltsevaya line, a planned orbital metro line. That station is opened on 7 December 2021.

== Public art ==
Constructed by the China Railway Construction Corporation (CRCC), the station features unique design elements which are heavily influenced by Chinese culture, as part of a collaboration with the company.
