= Govorovo =

Moscow Metro station

Govorovo Говорово
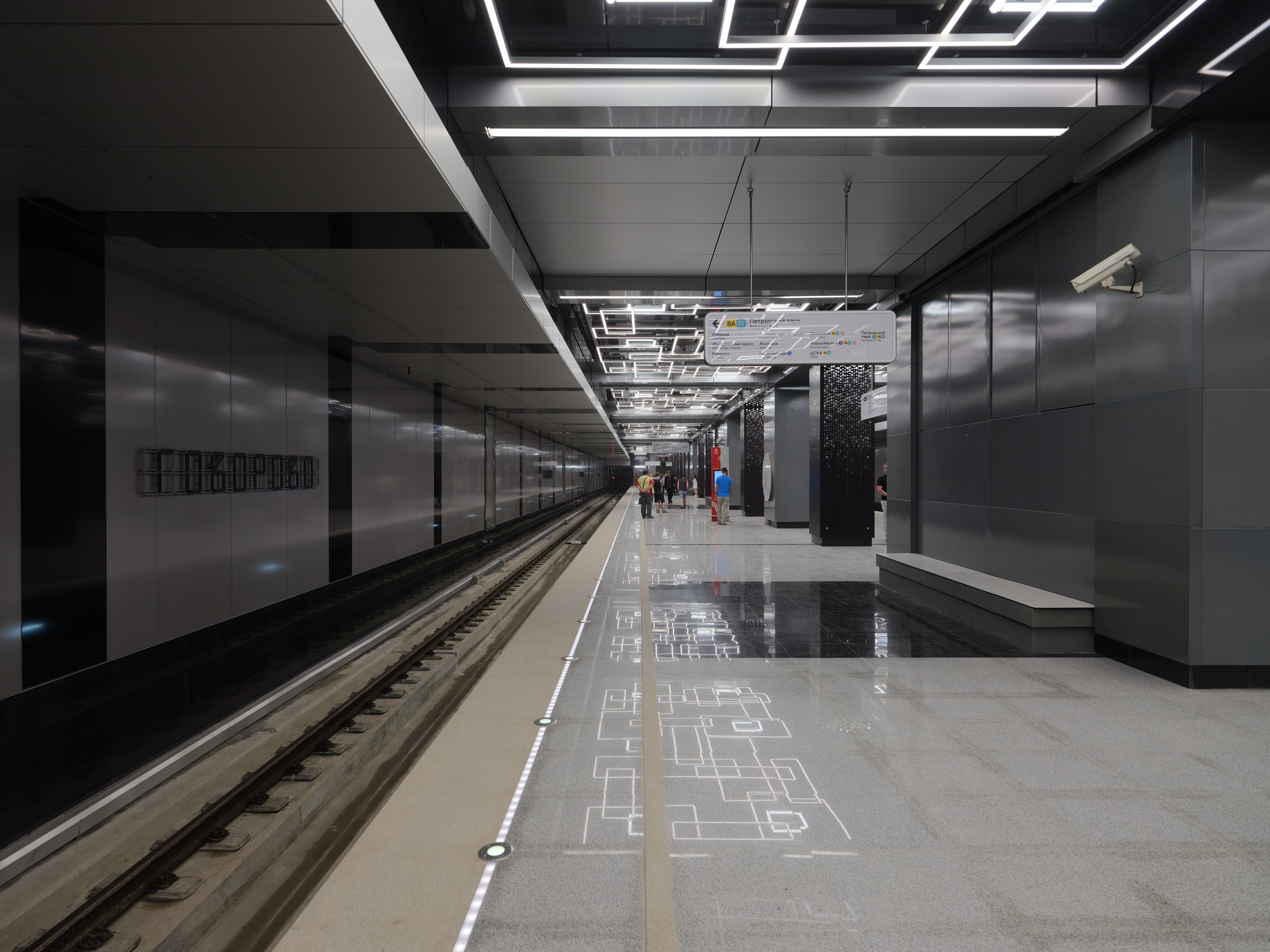

General information
- Location: Solntsevo District, Western Administrative Okrug; Moscow; Russia
- Coordinates: 55.659531°N 37.417392°E
- System: Moscow Metro station
- Owner: Moskovsky Metropoliten
- Line: Solntsevskaya line
- Platforms: 1 island platform

Construction
- Structure type: Two-span shallow-column station
- Platform levels: 1

History
- Opened: 30 August 2018

Services
Preceding station	Moscow Metro	Following station
Solntsevo towards Aeroport Vnukovo	Kalininsko-Solntsevskaya line (Solntsevsky radius)	Ozyornaya towards Delovoy Tsentr
Route map
Kalininskaya line
Location
- Location within Moscow Metro

Govorovo (Russian: Говорово) is a station on the Kalininsko-Solntsevskaya Line of the Moscow Metro. Previously planned to open in 2017, it opened on August 30, 2018, as part of line's "Ramenki" - "Rasskazovka" extension.

During planning, the station was named Teryoshkovo Russian: Терёшково, but was renamed Govorovo in April 2015.

The station was located parallel to Borovskoye Shosse near the street named 50 Years of the October Revolution. The station's two exits will be between the streets.
