= Borovskoye Shosse =

Moscow Metro station

Borovskoye Shosse Боровское шоссе
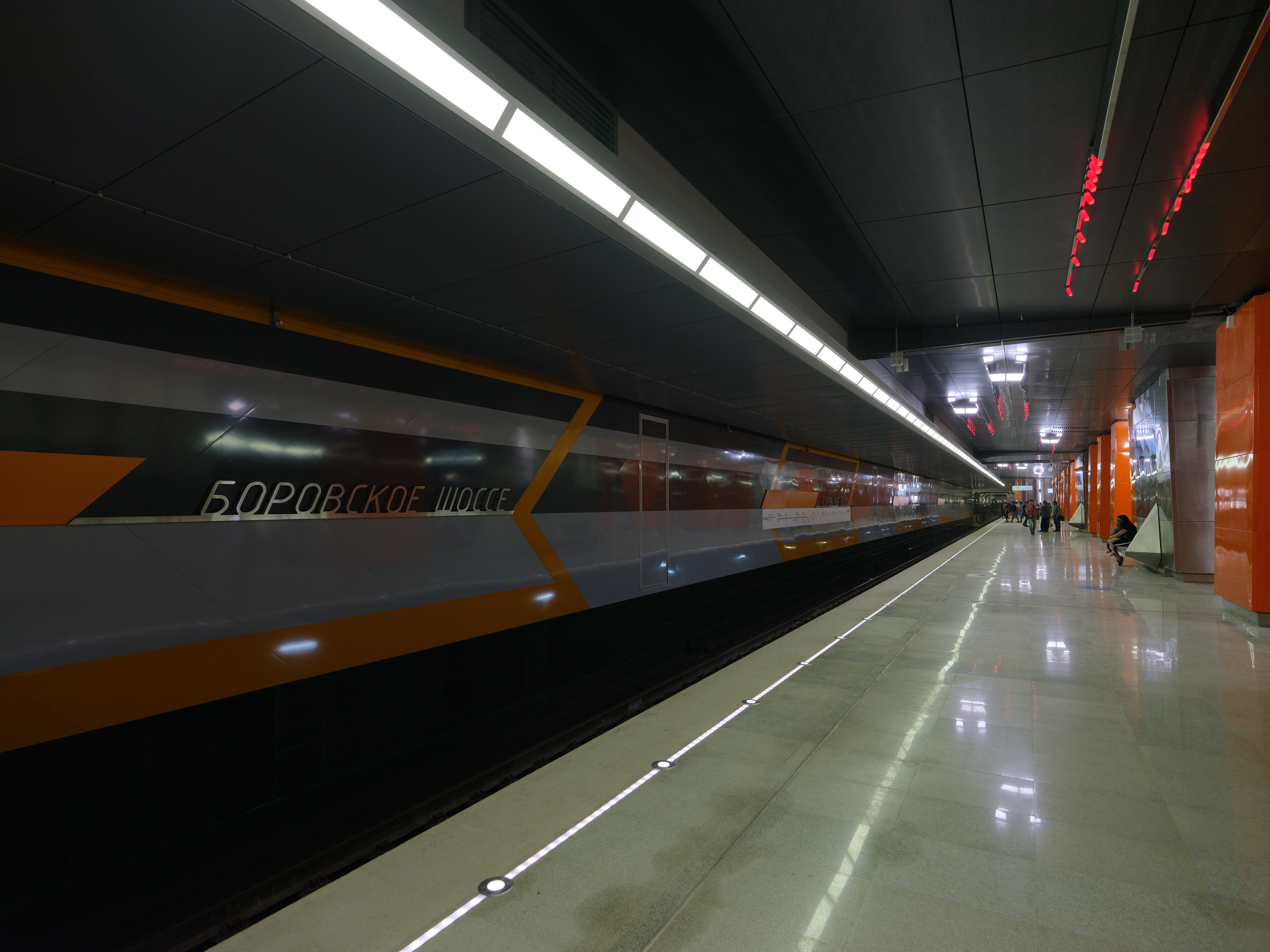

General information
- Location: Novo-Peredelkino District, Western Administrative Okrug; Moscow; Russia
- Coordinates: 55.647672°N 37.370186°E
- System: Moscow Metro station
- Owner: Moskovsky Metropoliten
- Line: Solntsevskaya line
- Platforms: 1 island platform

Construction
- Structure type: Two-span shallow-column station
- Platform levels: 1

History
- Opened: 30 August 2018

Services
Preceding station	Moscow Metro	Following station
Novoperedelkino towards Aeroport Vnukovo	Kalininsko-Solntsevskaya line (Solntsevsky radius)	Solntsevo towards Delovoy Tsentr
Route map
Kalininskaya line
Location
- Location within Moscow Metro

Borovskoye Shosse (Russian: Боровское шоссе) is a station on the Kalininsko-Solntsevskaya line of the Moscow Metro. It opened on August 30, 2018 as part of line's Ramenki - Rasskazovka extension.

It is in the Novo-Peredelkino District of Moscow at the intersection of Prirechnaya Ulitsa and Borovskoye Shosse, after which the station takes its name.
