= Ramenki =

Ramenki may refer to:

- Ramenki District, a district of Western Administrative Okrug of Moscow, Russia
- Ramenki (rural locality), name of several rural localities in Russia
- Ramenki (Moscow Metro), a station on the Kalininsko-Solntsevskaya Line of the Moscow Metro opened in 2017
