= Michurinsky Prospekt (Bolshaya Koltsevaya line) =

Prospective Moscow Metro station

Michurinsky Prospekt Мичуринский проспект
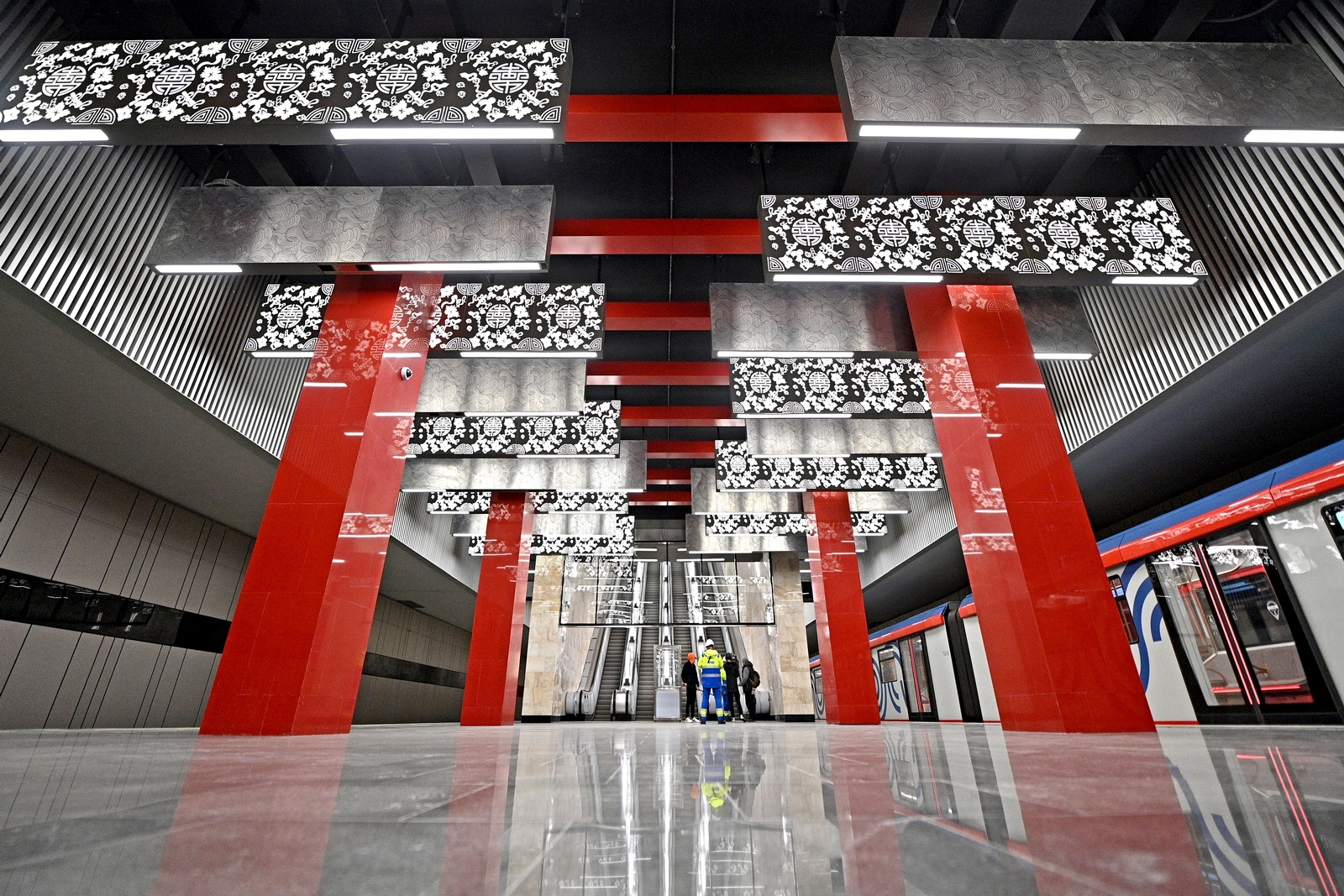
- Michurinsky Prospekt. A view of the escalators

General information
- Location: Ramenki District, Western Administrative Okrug; Moscow; Russia
- System: Moscow Metro station
- Owner: Moskovsky Metropoliten
- Line: Bolshaya Koltsevaya line
- Platforms: 1 island platform

History
- Opened: 7 December 2021; 4 years ago

Services
Preceding station	Moscow Metro	Following station
Prospekt Vernadskogo anticlockwise / outer	Bolshaya Koltsevaya line	Aminyevskaya clockwise / inner
Ozyornaya towards Aeroport Vnukovo	Kalininsko-Solntsevskaya line transfer at Michurinsky Prospekt	Ramenki towards Novokosino
Route map
Bolshaya Koltsevaya line
Location
- Location within Moscow Metro

Michurinsky Prospekt (Russian: Мичуринский проспект) is a Moscow Metro station of the Bolshaya Koltsevaya line. It was opened on 7 December 2021 as part of the section between Mnyovniki and Kakhovskaya. A transfer to Michurinsky Prospekt is opened on 7 December 2021.

== Gallery ==
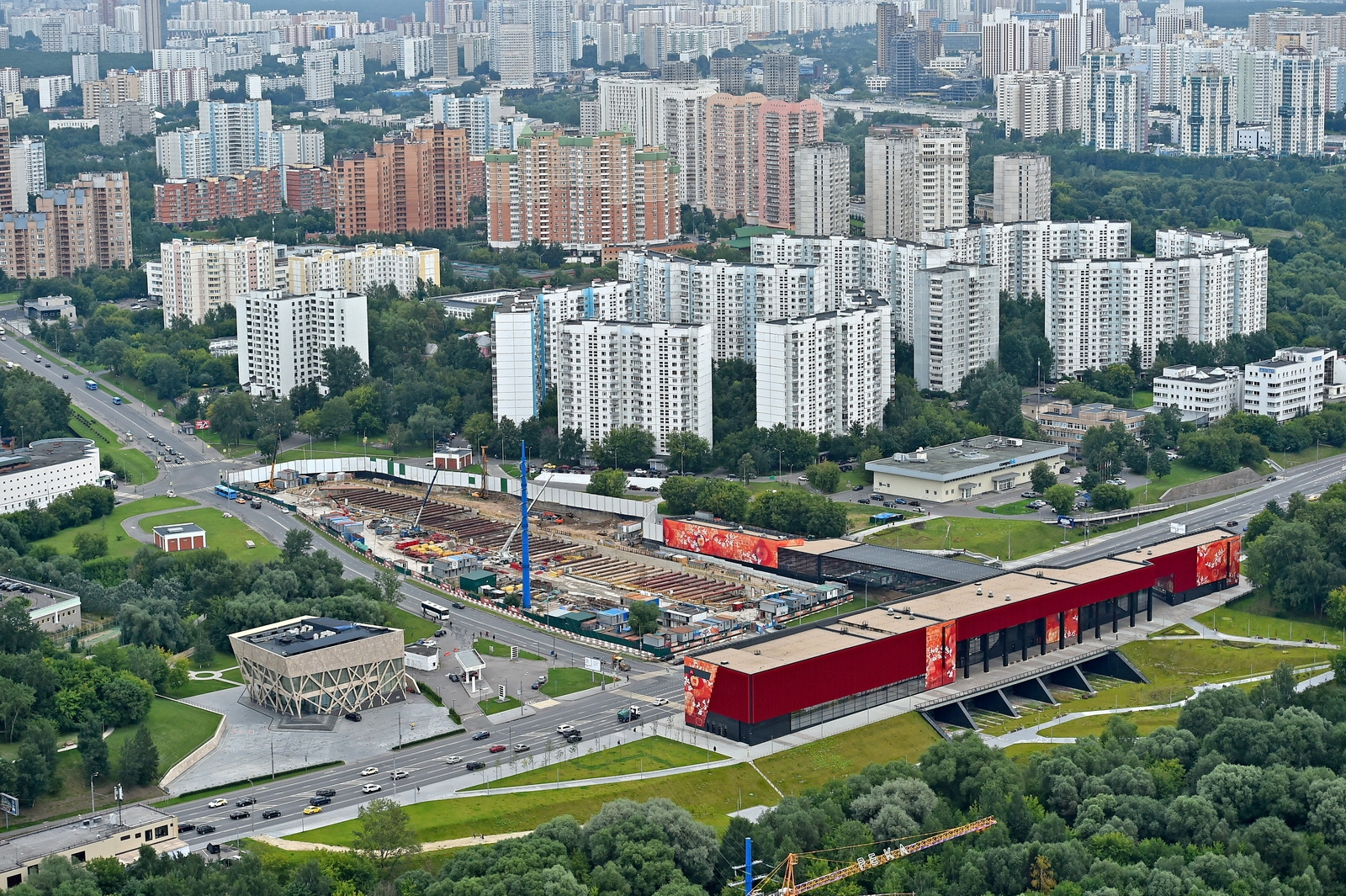
Construction site near the station of the same name of Kalininsko-Solntsevskaya line.
