= Novoperedelkino =

Moscow Metro station

Novoperedelkino Новопеределкино
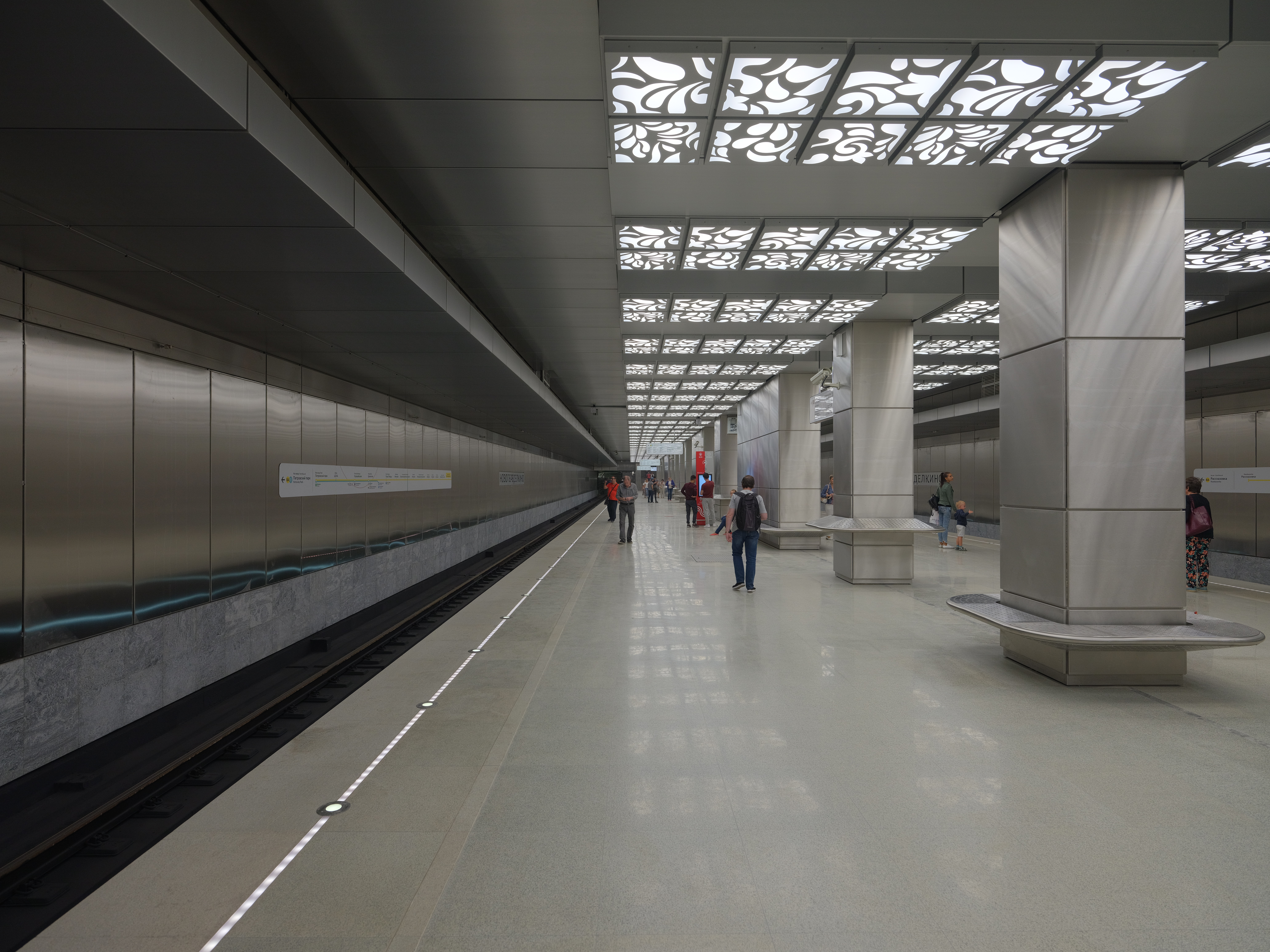

General information
- Location: Novo-Peredelkino District, Western Administrative Okrug; Moscow; Russia
- Coordinates: 55.639167°N 37.354444°E
- System: Moscow Metro station
- Owner: Moskovsky Metropoliten
- Line: Solntsevskaya line
- Platforms: 1 island platform

Construction
- Structure type: Two-span shallow-column station
- Platform levels: 1
- Parking: No

History
- Opened: 30 August 2018

Services
Preceding station	Moscow Metro	Following station
Rasskazovka towards Aeroport Vnukovo	Kalininsko-Solntsevskaya line (Solntsevsky radius)	Borovskoye Shosse towards Delovoy Tsentr
Route map
Kalininskaya line
Location
- Location within Moscow Metro

Novoperedelkino (Russian: Новопеределкино) is a station on the Kalininsko-Solntsevskaya line of the Moscow Metro. It opened on August 30, 2018 as part of the line's "Ramenki"—"Rasskazovka" extension. This is the penultimate station on the southern branch.

It is in the Novo-Peredelkino District of Moscow and takes its name from the district.
