= Ozyornaya (Moscow Metro) =

Moscow Metro station

Ozyornaya Озёрная
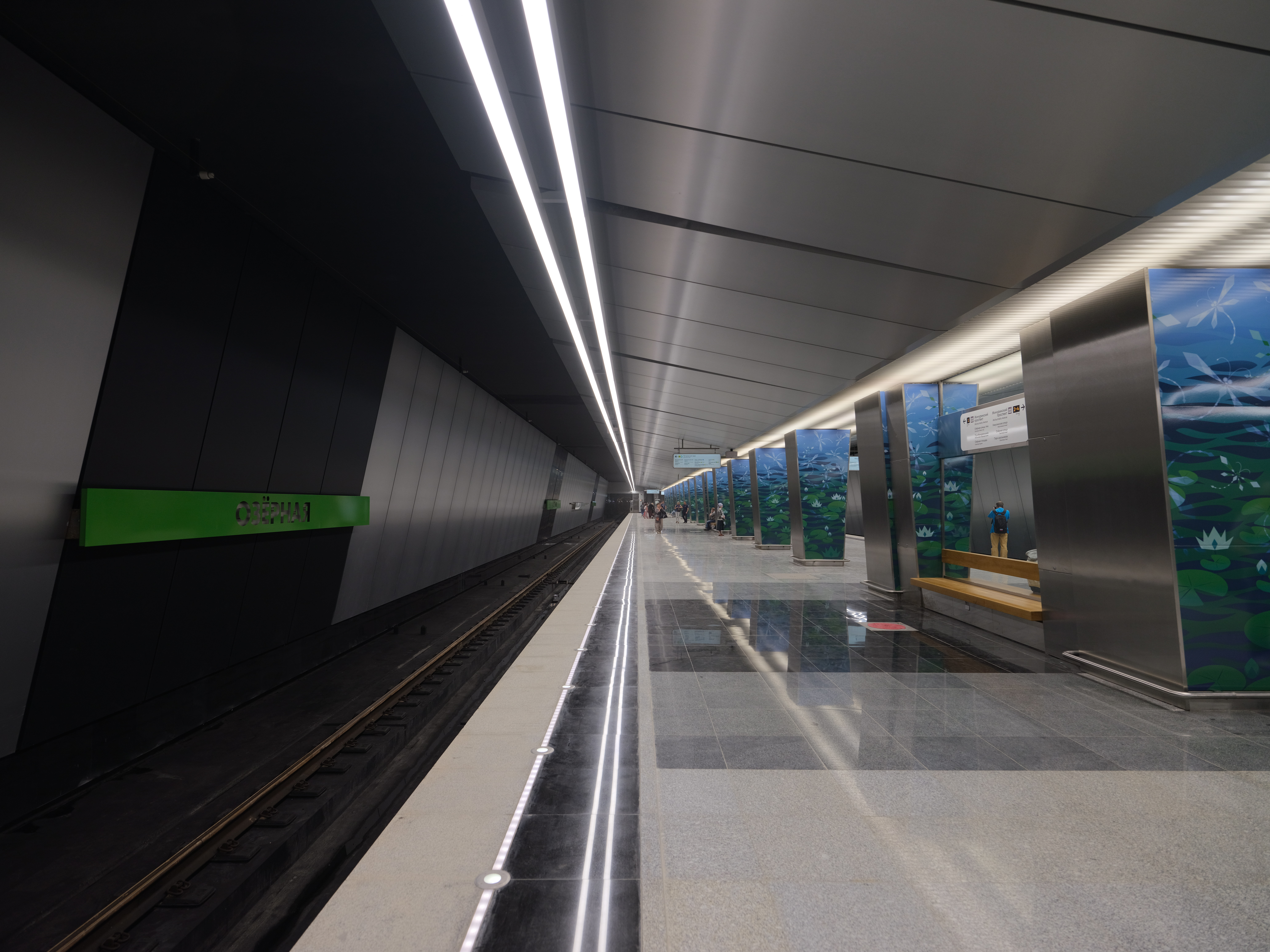

General information
- Location: Ochakovo-Matveyevskoye District, Western Administrative Okrug; Moscow; Russia
- Coordinates: 55.670448°N 37.449525°E
- System: Moscow Metro station
- Owner: Moskovsky Metropoliten
- Line: Solntsevskaya line
- Platforms: 1 island platform

Construction
- Structure type: Two-span shallow-column station
- Platform levels: 1

History
- Opened: 30 August 2018

Services
Preceding station	Moscow Metro	Following station
Govorovo towards Aeroport Vnukovo	Kalininsko-Solntsevskaya line (Solntsevsky radius)	Michurinsky Prospekt towards Delovoy Tsentr
Route map
Kalininskaya line
Location
- Location within Moscow Metro

Ozyornaya (Russian: Озёрная) is a station on the Kalininsko-Solntsevskaya line of the Moscow Metro, it opened on 30 August 2018 as part of line's "Ramenki" - "Rasskazovka" extension.

The city initially named the Station Ochakovo. In June 2018, the city changed the name to Ozyornaya, which comes from the nearby square and street, Ozyornaya Ploshchad and Ozyornaya Street.

== Architecture and decoration ==
Ozernaya station was built according to the standard project developed by the author's team under the direction of Leonid Borzenkov, which included Mikhail Volovich, Sergey Kostikov, Tamara Nagieva, Natalia Soldatova and Vasily Uvarov. This project was proposed by JSC Metrogiprotrans for the stations of the Minskaya - Ozernaya section. Ozernaya station, as well as the stations of the Minskaya - Ramenki section, is a two-span shallow column with one 12 metre wide island platform. The ceiling, track walls and column faces facing them are covered with multilayer metal panels with cellular filling and polished surface of neutral grey colour, part of the lobby walls are made of volumetric glazed ceramic stone of the same tones. The stations differ from each other by the background colour and thematic patterns of illuminated glass panels, which are present on some walls of the lobbies and on the faces of platform columns facing the exits, with the pattern passing from one column to another. The design of Ozernaya station contains references to the nearby Ochakovskiye Ponds and Ozernaya Square: the blue-green background depicts aquatic vegetation, in particular, lilies, and highlights on the water. The station is finished with granite, metal-ceramic slabs and stainless steel.

== Location and lobbies ==
The station is located along Michurinsky Prospekt at the intersection with Nikulinskaya Street. The station has two underground concourses, with exits from the south-western concourse leading to the northern part of Michurinsky Prospekt and Ozernaya Square. Both lobbies are decorated with illuminated stained glass windows with lily pads. Each of the lobbies has a lift for persons with disabilities. Underground concourse No. 1 is connected to the platform by a staircase descent and has access to pedestrian passages that lead to three exits with lifts located on both sides of Nikulinskaya Street and Michurinsky Prospekt. Underground concourse No. 2 is connected to the platform by three escalator belts and has an exit from the northern side of Michurinsky Prospekt in the direction of the stopping and staging areas on Ozernaya Square. On the basis of the station, the Ozernaya transport and interchange hub will be organised, which will be located on Ozernaya Square on an area of 11.2 hectares.

== Ground public transportation ==
The following city passenger transport routes can be changed at this station:

- Buses: m16, m17, c17, 120, 226, 261, 274, 329, 330, 520, 610, 622, 630, 667, 688, 699, 718, 752, 793, 807, 883, n11
