= Minskaya (Moscow Metro) =

Moscow Metro station

Minskaya Минская
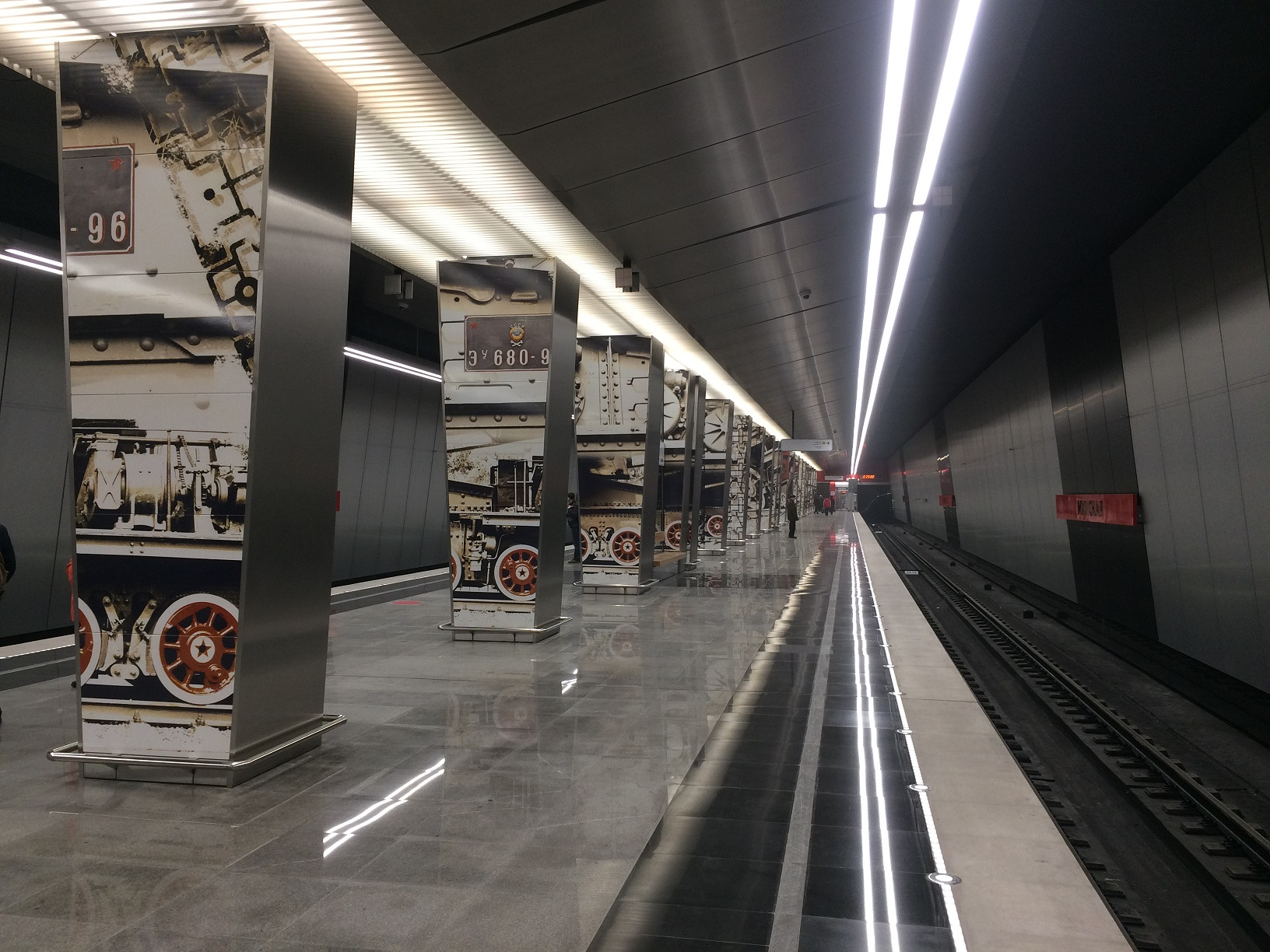

General information
- Location: Dorogomilovo District, Fili-Davydkovo District; Western Administrative Okrug; Moscow; Russia
- Coordinates: 55.7246°N 37.4970°E
- System: Moscow Metro station
- Owner: Moskovsky Metropoliten
- Line: Solntsevskaya line
- Platforms: 1 island platform
- Tracks: 2

Construction
- Structure type: Two-span shallow-column station
- Platform levels: 1

History
- Opened: March 16, 2017

Services
Preceding station	Moscow Metro	Following station
Lomonosovsky Prospekt towards Aeroport Vnukovo	Kalininsko-Solntsevskaya line (Solntsevsky radius)	Park Pobedy towards Delovoy Tsentr
Route map
Solntsevskaya line
Location
- Location within Moscow Metro

Minskaya (Russian: Минская) is a station of the Kalininsko-Solntsevskaya Line of the Moscow Metro between Lomonosovsky Prospekt and Park Pobedy. The station was opened on 16 March 2017 as a part of the stretch between Park Pobedy and Ramenki.
