= Lomonosovsky Prospekt (Moscow Metro) =

Moscow Metro station

Lomonosovsky Prospekt Ломоносовский проспект
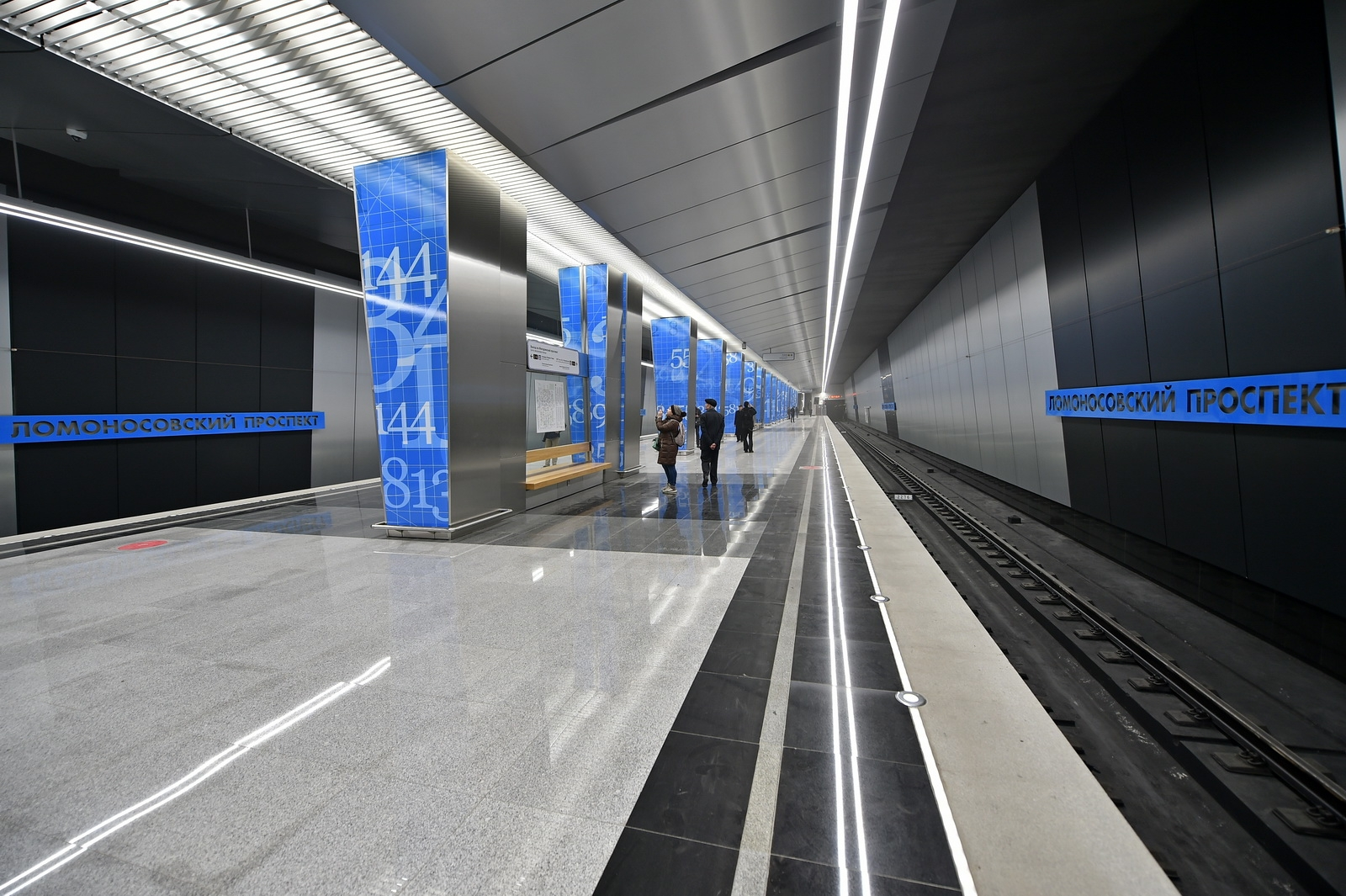

General information
- Location: Ramenki District, Western Administrative Okrug; Moscow; Russia
- Coordinates: 55.7069°N 37.5156°E
- System: Moscow Metro station
- Owner: Moskovsky Metropoliten
- Line: Solntsevskaya line
- Platforms: 1 island platform

Construction
- Structure type: Two-span shallow-column station
- Depth: 15 metres (49 ft)

History
- Opened: March 16, 2017

Services
Preceding station	Moscow Metro	Following station
Ramenki towards Aeroport Vnukovo	Kalininsko-Solntsevskaya line (Solntsevsky radius)	Minskaya towards Delovoy Tsentr
Route map
Solntsevskaya line
Location
- Location within Moscow Metro

Lomonosovsky Prospekt (Russian: Ломоносовский проспект) is a station on the Kalininsko-Solntsevskaya Line of the Moscow Metro. It opened on 16 March 2017 as part of the line's extension between Park Pobedy and Ramenki. Tunneling between the station and that next from it, Ramenki, started in 2013.
