= Lomonosovsky Prospekt =

Street in Moscow, Russia

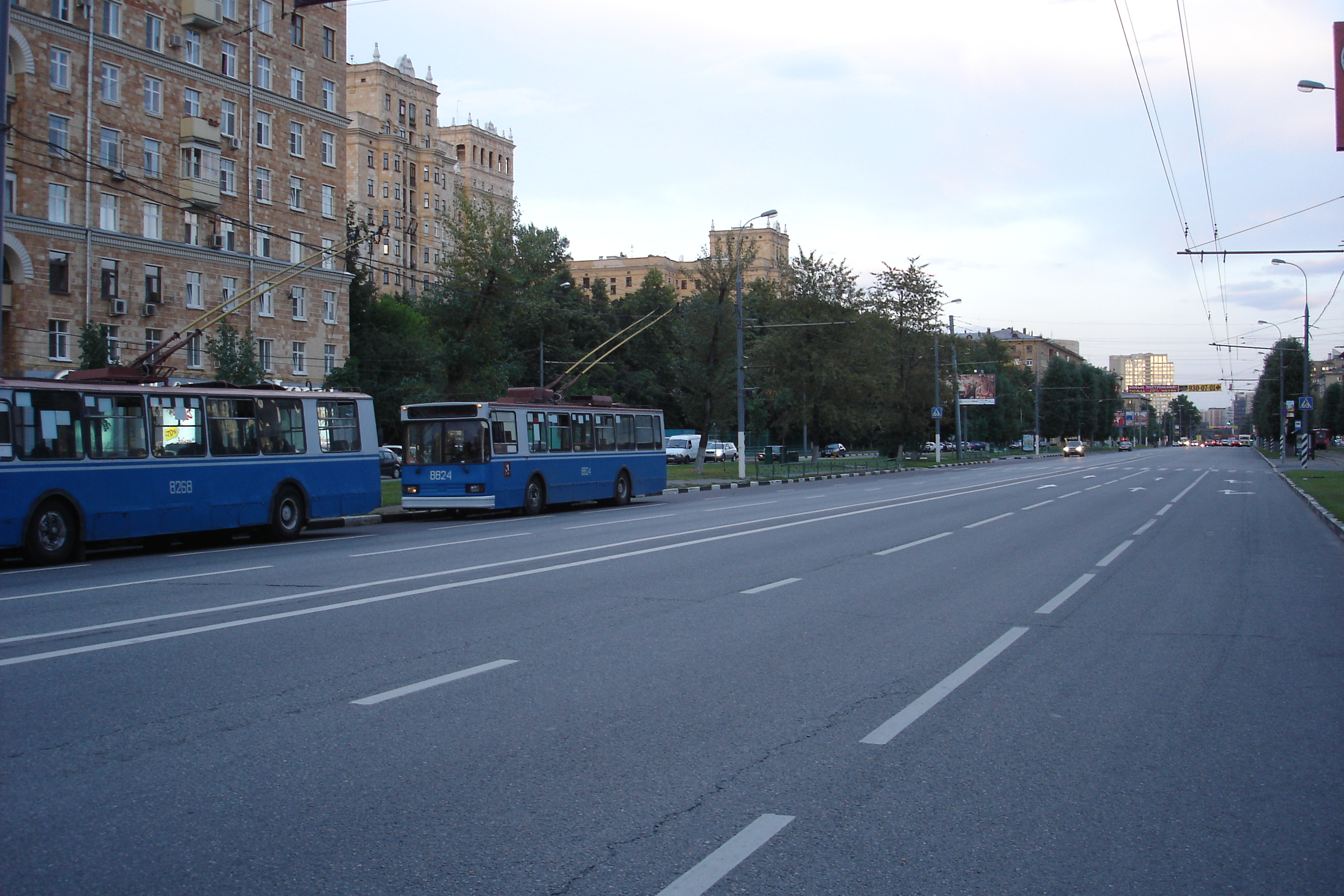
- Lomonosovsky Prospekt as viewed from Universitet metro station to the east
- Native name: Ломоносовский проспект (Russian)
- Length: 4.3 km (2.7 mi)
- Location: Moscow, Russia; South-Western Administrative Okrug; Western Administrative Okrug
- Postal code: 119261 (№ 1-11), 119296 (№ 2-20), 119234 (№ 22-28, МГУ), 119311 (№ 13-23), 119192 (№ 25-43); 119330 (№ 30-40)
- Nearest metro station: Universitet; Lomonosovsky Prospekt

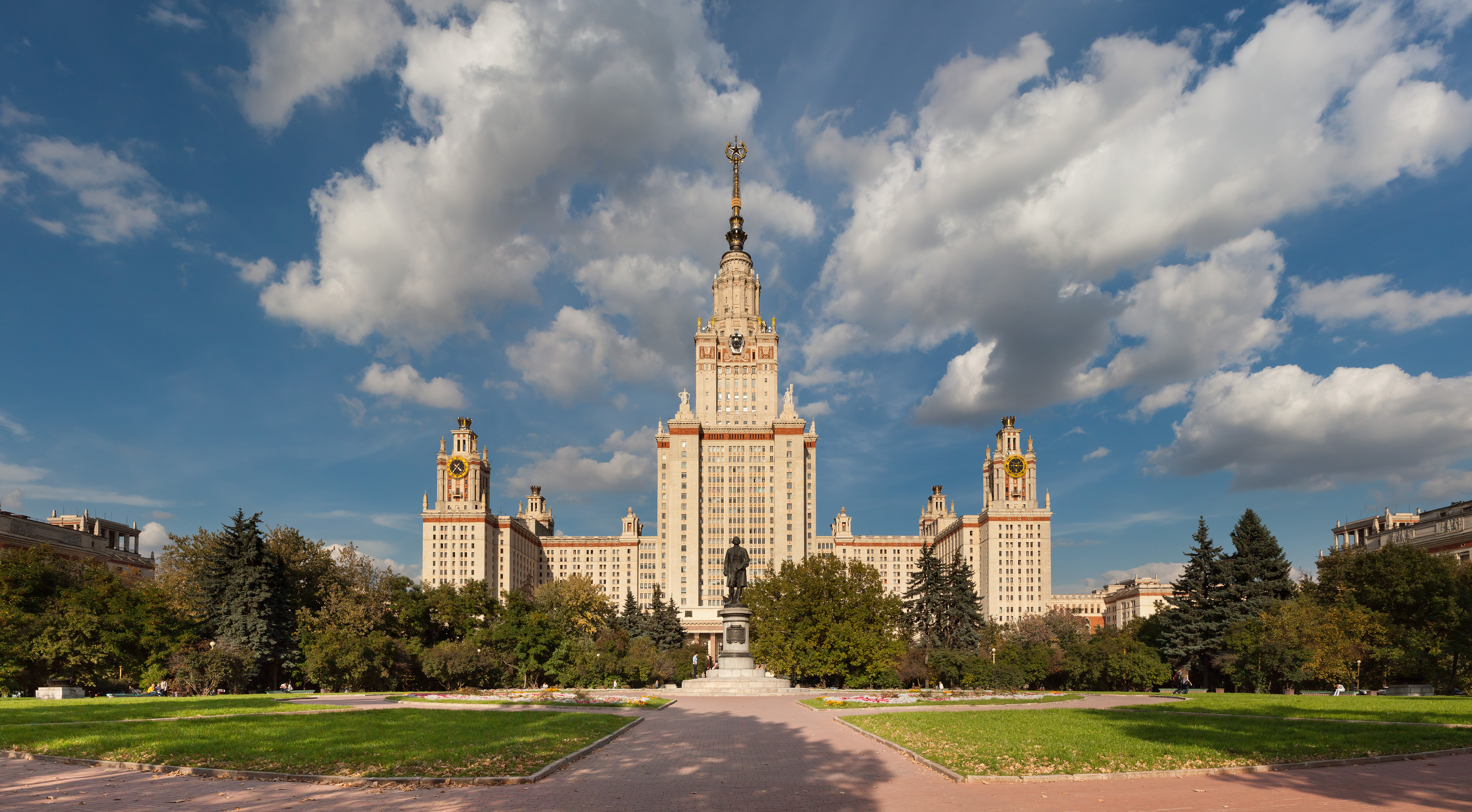
MSU main building as viewed from the avenue

Lomonosovsky Prospekt is an avenue in Moscow, Russia. It runs from Vavilova Street in the east (continuing Nakhimovsky Prospekt) to Mosfilmovskaya Street in the west (after which it continues as Minskaya Street).

The street was named in 1956 after Mikhail Lomonosov, a Russian scientist and active contributor to the founding of Moscow State University whose new campus had been by then constructed in the vicinity of the avenue.

As part of the cancelled Fourth Ring Road (ru), Lomonosovsky Prospekt is a busy chord connecting radial streets, with major crossings such as Leninsky Prospekt and Prospekt Vernadskogo (Moscow).

The avenue is serviced by two metro stations, Universitet, built in 1959, and another one, bearing the same name as the avenue, that opened in March 2017.

== See also ==
- Lyceum 1533 (LIT)
