= Vnukovo =

Vnukovo may refer to:

- Vnukovo International Airport
- Aeroport Vnukovo (Moscow Metro)
- Vnukovo District
