= Pykhtino (Moscow Metro) =

Prospective Moscow Metro station

Pykhtino Пыхтино
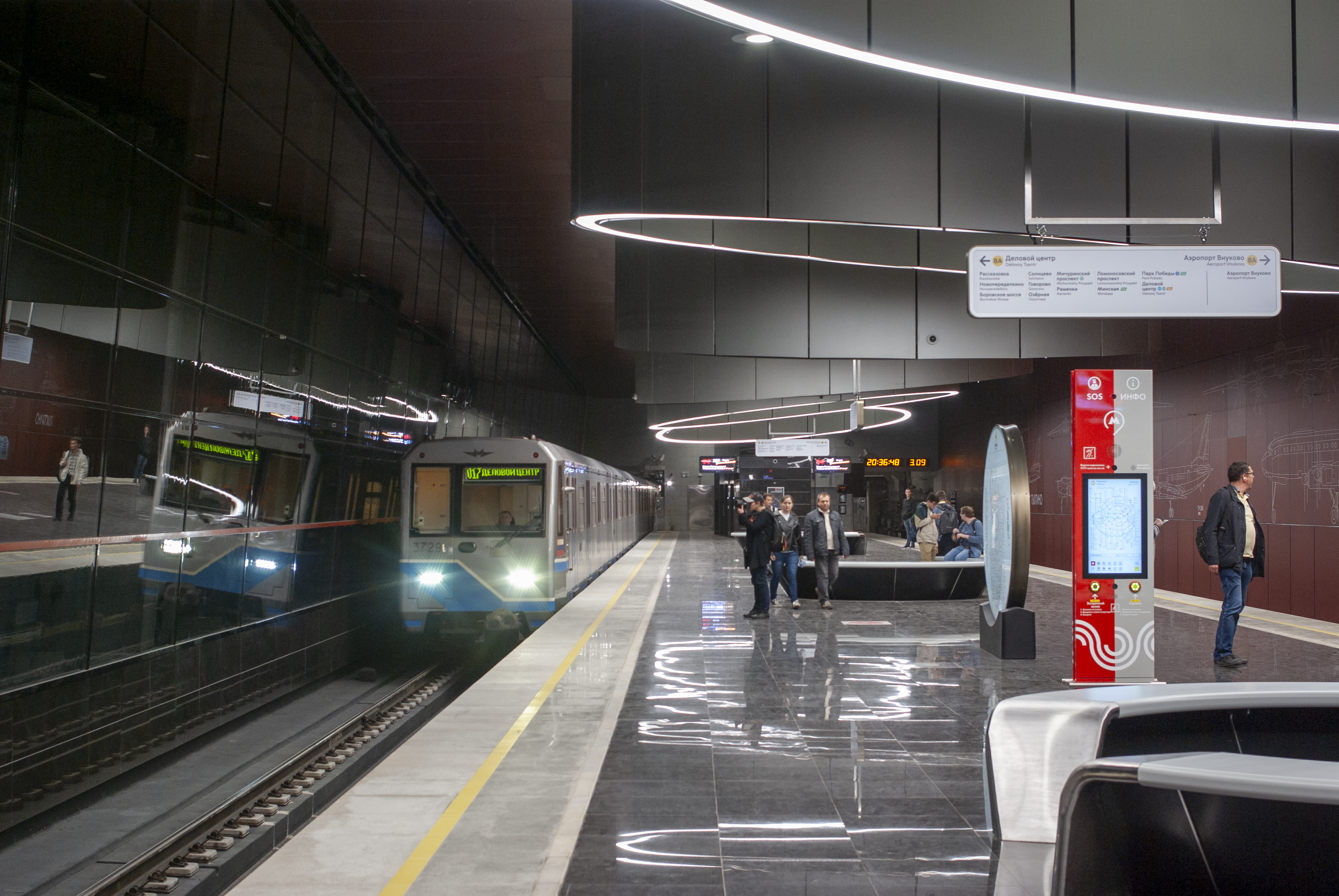
- Northbound train near a glass wall

General information
- Location: Vnukovskoye Settlement, Novomoskovsky Administrative Okrug; Moscow; Russia
- Coordinates: 55°37′30″N 37°17′53″E
- System: Moscow Metro station
- Owner: Moskovsky Metropoliten
- Line: Solntsevskaya line
- Platforms: 1 island platform

History
- Opened: 6 September 2023

Services
Preceding station	Moscow Metro	Following station
Aeroport Vnukovo Terminus	Kalininsko-Solntsevskaya line (Solntsevsky radius)	Rasskazovka towards Delovoy Tsentr
Location
- Location within Moscow Metro

Pykhtino is a Moscow Metro station of the Kalininsko-Solntsevskaya line. It was opened on 6 September 2023.

Map

The station serves Solncevo-Park residential complex. Its design features an escalator incline decorated by a scale model of TU-144 plane.

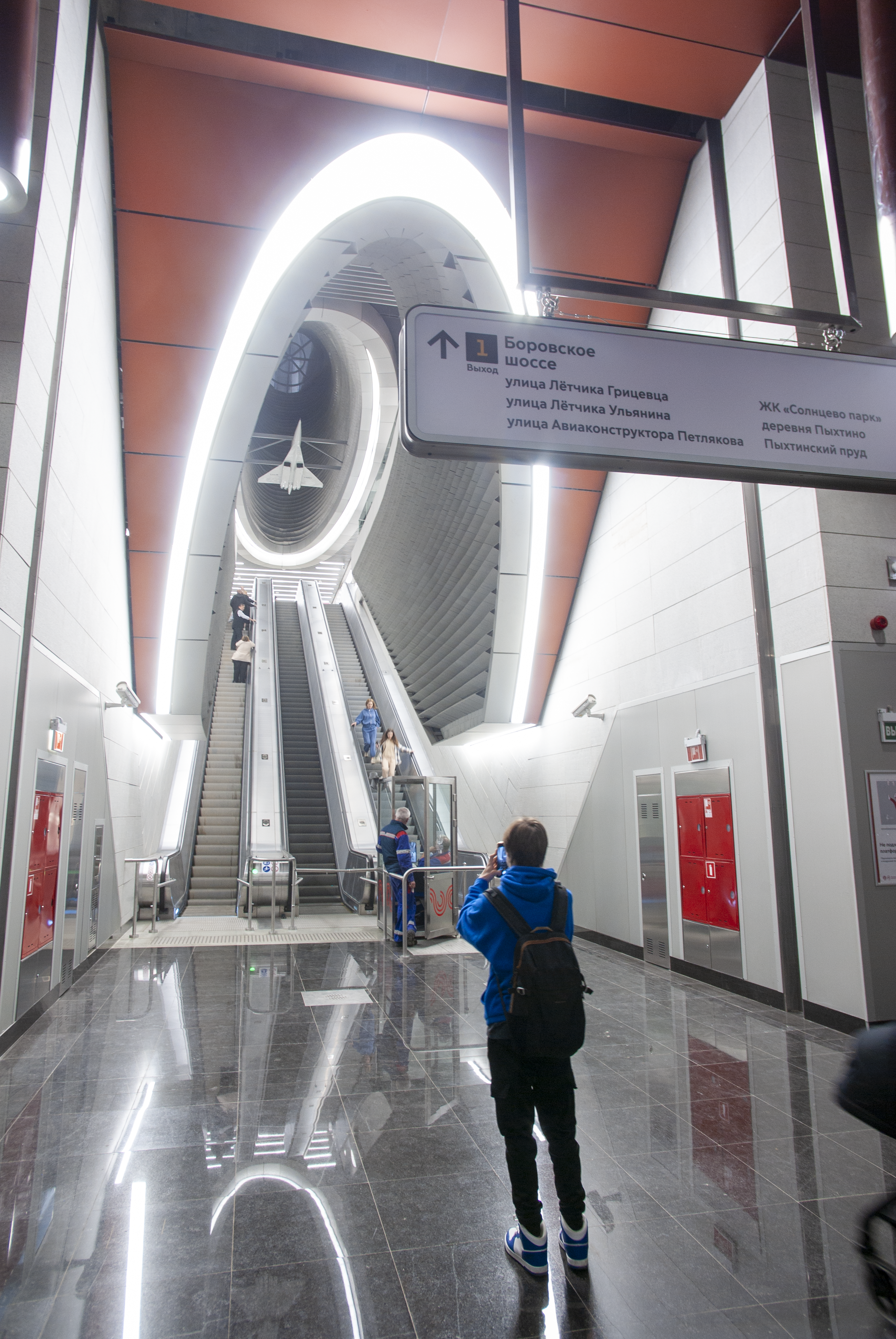
Escalator incline

The station's walls are decorated with drawings of Tupolev passenger airplanes.
