= Park Pobedy (Moscow Metro) =

Moscow Metro station

Park Pobedy Парк Победы
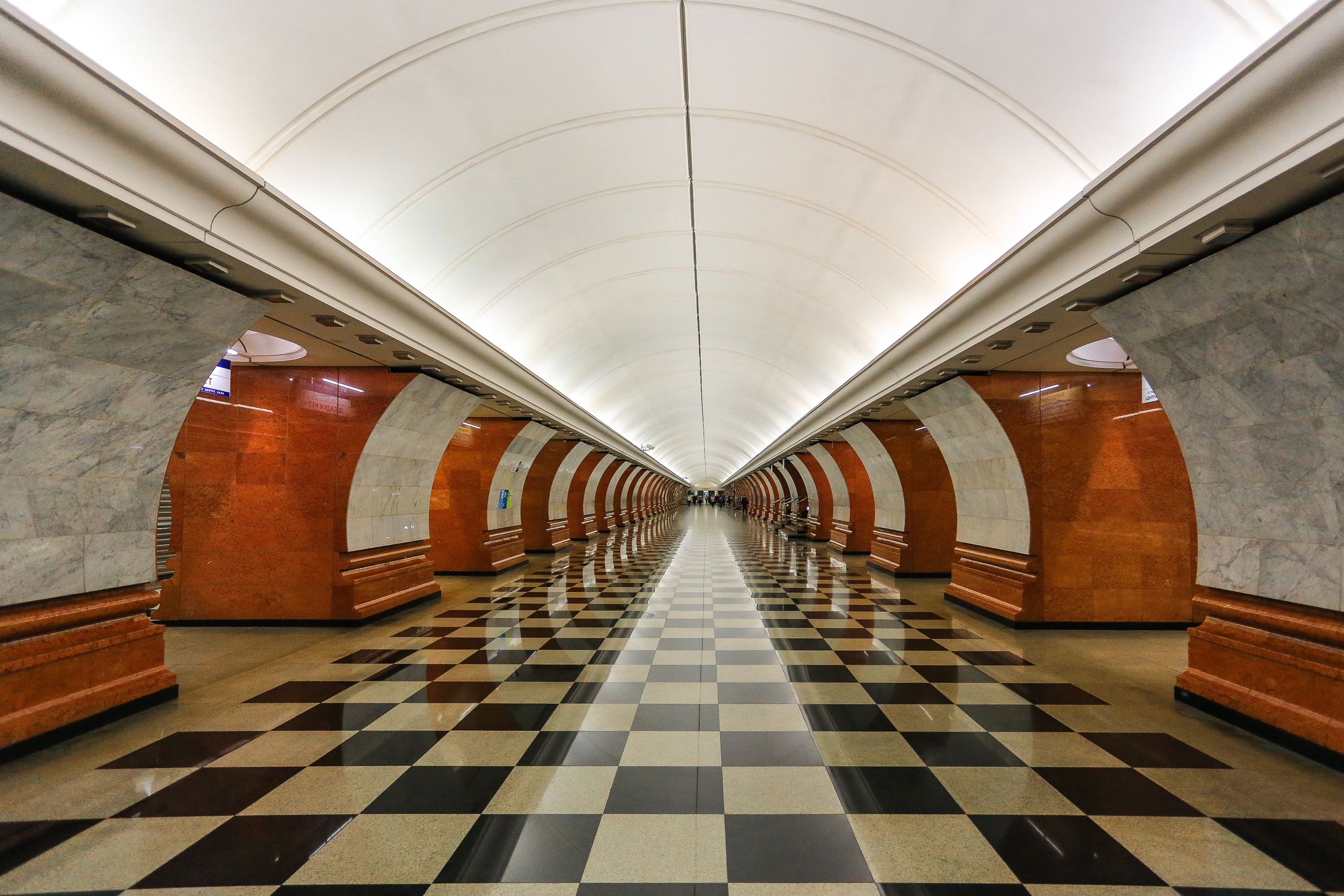

General information
- Location: Kutuzovsky Avenue, Dorogomilovo District, Western Administrative Okrug
- Coordinates: 55.7362°N 37.5182°E
- System: Moscow Metro station
- Owner: Moskovsky Metropoliten
- Lines: Arbatsko-Pokrovskaya line Kalininsko-Solntsevskaya line (Solntsevsky radius)
- Platforms: 2 island platforms
- Tracks: 4
- Connections: Bus: м2, м27, т7, т39, 91, 116, 157, 205, 339, 442, 454, 457, 474, 477, 840, н2

Construction
- Structure type: Deep pylon tri-span
- Depth: 84 metres (276 ft)
- Platform levels: 1
- Parking: No

History
- Opened: 6 May 2003; 23 years ago

Services
Preceding station	Moscow Metro	Following station
Slavyansky Bulvar towards Pyatnitskoye Shosse	Arbatsko-Pokrovskaya line	Kiyevskaya towards Shchyolkovskaya
Minskaya towards Aeroport Vnukovo	Kalininsko-Solntsevskaya line (Solntsevsky radius)	Delovoy Tsentr Terminus
Route map
Arbatsko-Pokrovskaya line
Solntsevskaya line
Location
- Location within Moscow Metro

Park Pobedy (Russian: Парк Победы, lit. 'Victory Park') is a station of the Moscow Metro in the city's Dorogomilovo District. It serves two lines: the Arbatsko-Pokrovskaya line and the Kalininsko-Solntsevskaya line. At 84 metres (276 ft) underground, according to the official figures, it is the deepest metro station in Moscow and one of the deepest in the world.

== Services ==
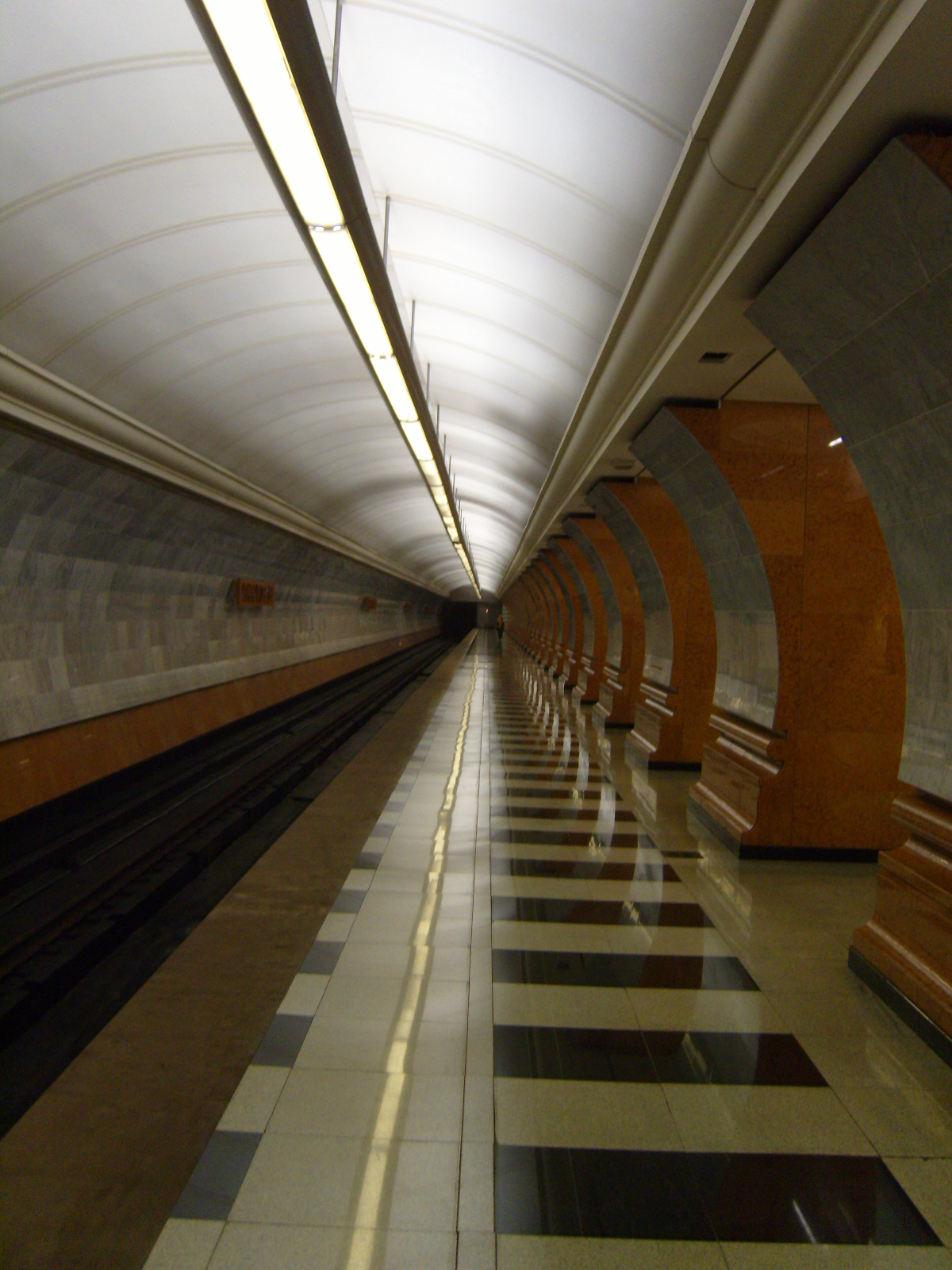
Northern platform

The Arbatsko-Pokrovskaya line serves the station with trains running from Pyatnitskoye Shosse in the northwest via Park Pobedy and central Moscow to Shchyolkovskaya in the northeast of the city.

Until 16 March 2017, the Kalininsko-Solntsevskaya line's western section had only two stations, Park Pobedy and Delovoy Tsentr. An extension to the south, opened on that day, connected Park Pobedy first with Ramenki via two other stations. Eventually it is planned to be extended to Rasskazovka, near Vnukovo International Airport.

Park Pobedy allows cross-platform interchange between the two lines across the station's two island platforms.

== History ==
Construction began in 1986. The initial plans envisaged connections from the Arbatsko-Pokrovskaya line to the future Mitino–Butovskaya and the Solntsevo–Mytischinskaya Chordal lines. The former was accommodated in the station's design, with two additional tracks included parallel to those of the Arbatsko-Pokrovskaya line (the latter would have used a third set of track perpendicular to these). However, the 1990s financial crises ended the Chordal projects; the station opened in 2003 as a terminus of the Arbatsko-Pokrovskaya line, and in 2008 the Strogino–Mitino extension of the Arbatsko-Pokrovskaya line was begun from Park Pobedy. The second set of tracks saw their first use on 31 January 2014 as part of the Kalininsko-Solntsevskaya line's partial service to Delovoy Tsentr.

== Design ==
This is the only Moscow metro station where all passengers board and alight trains in different locations. A further complication was that only the southern, or inbound, platform had an entrance vestibule, so passengers arriving at the northern, or outbound, platform had to change platforms to leave the station. This, however, changed in March 2017, when the southern platform was connected directly to the entrance by a new escalator tunnel. The main reason for this was the opening of new section of Kalininsko-Solntsevskaya line, which now terminates at Ramenki instead of Park Pobedy.

At 84 metres (276 ft) underground, Park Pobedy is the deepest station in Moscow and the fifth-deepest in the world by mean depth, after Chongqing Rail Transit's Hongyancun station, Kyiv Metro's Arsenalna, Chongqing Rail Transit's Hongtudi station and Saint Petersburg Metro's Admiralteyskaya, and is the third deepest station by maximum depth, 97 metres (318 ft). It also contains the longest escalators in Europe, each one is 126 metres (413 ft) long and has 740 steps. The escalator ride to the surface takes approximately three minutes.

The two platforms, the work of architects Nataliya Shurygina and Nikolay Shumakov, are of identical design but have opposite colour schemes. The pylons of the outbound platform are faced with red marble on the transverse faces and pale grey marble on the longitudinal faces. The inbound platform is the exact reverse. The station is adorned with two large mosaics by Zurab Tsereteli depicting the 1812 French Invasion of Russia (at the end of the inbound platform) and World War II (on the outbound platform).

The station has a unique structural design. Instead of traditional cast iron tunnel lining Park Pobedy lining included steel blocks filled with concrete. It significantly reduced amount of structural metal and consequentially overall cost of construction.

== Gallery ==
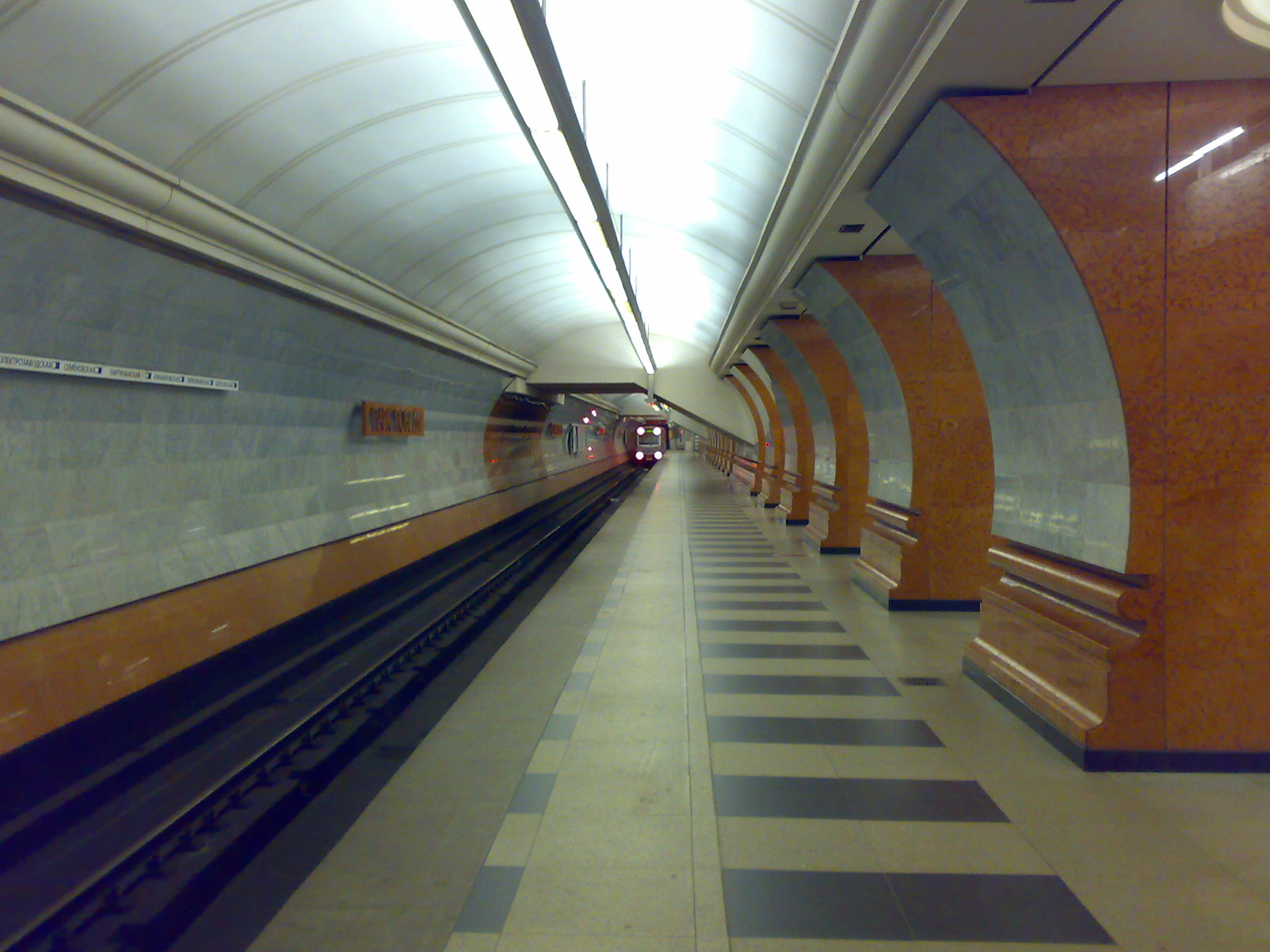
Southern platform

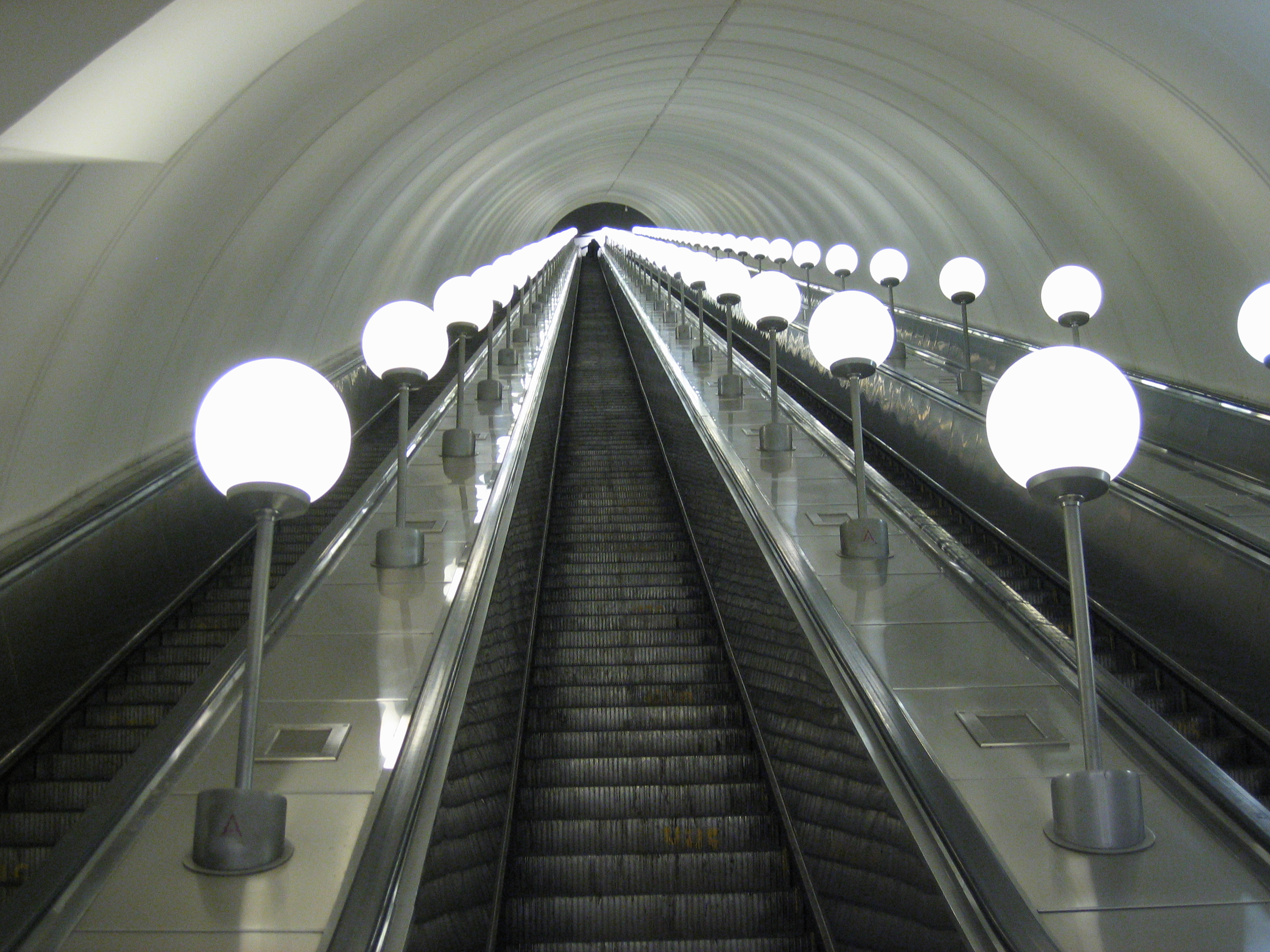
The escalators

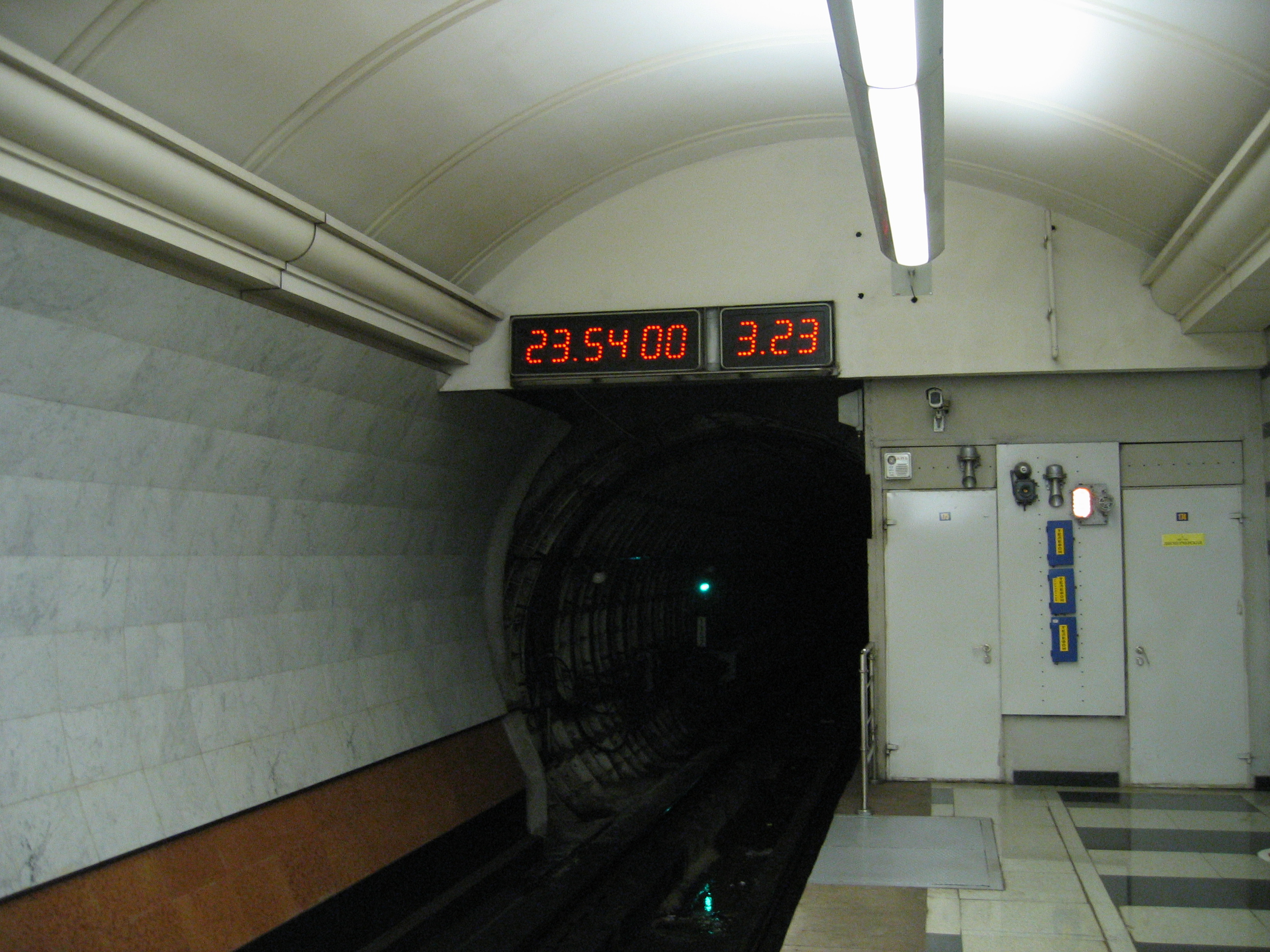
Clocks

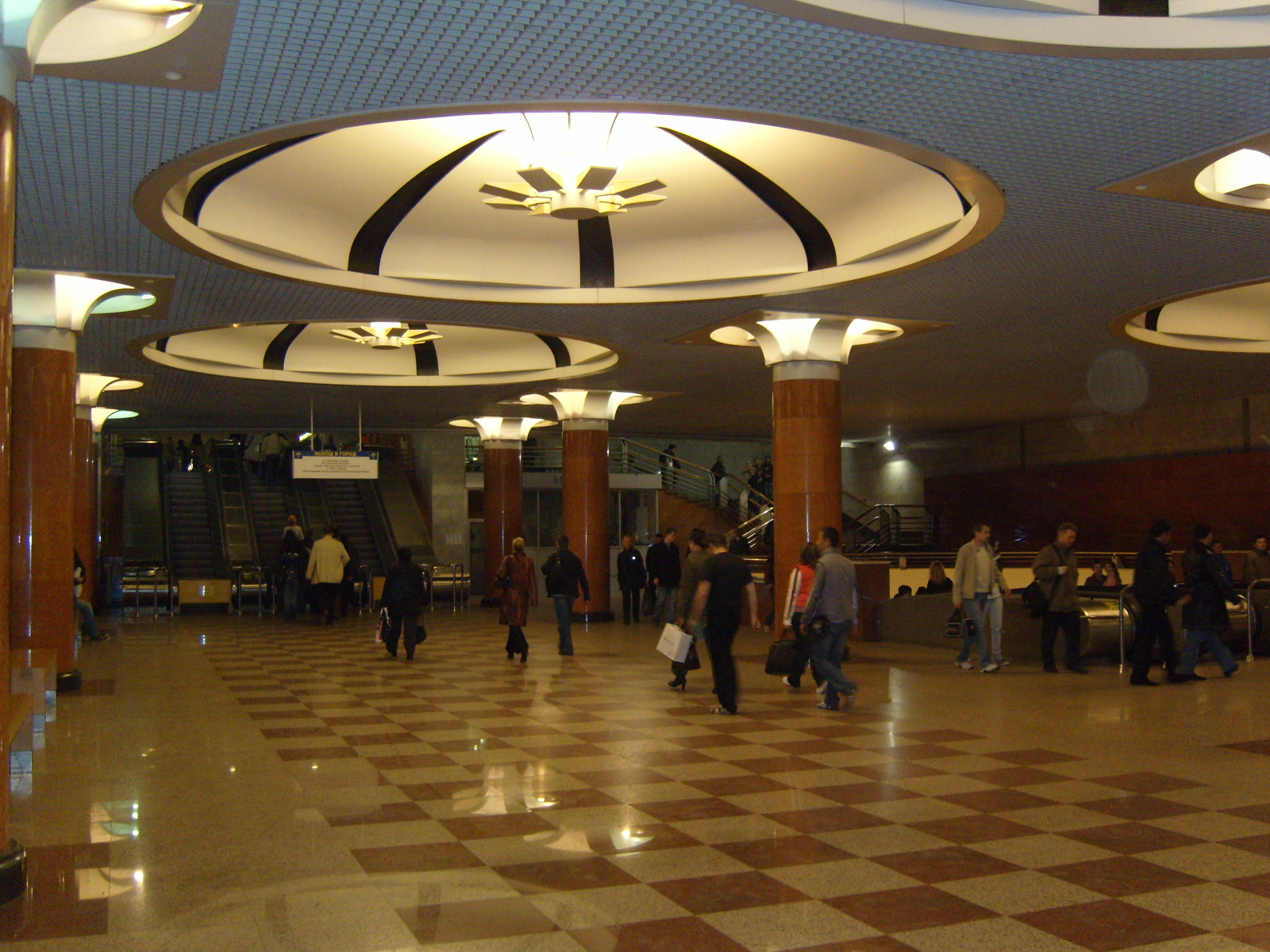
Vestibule

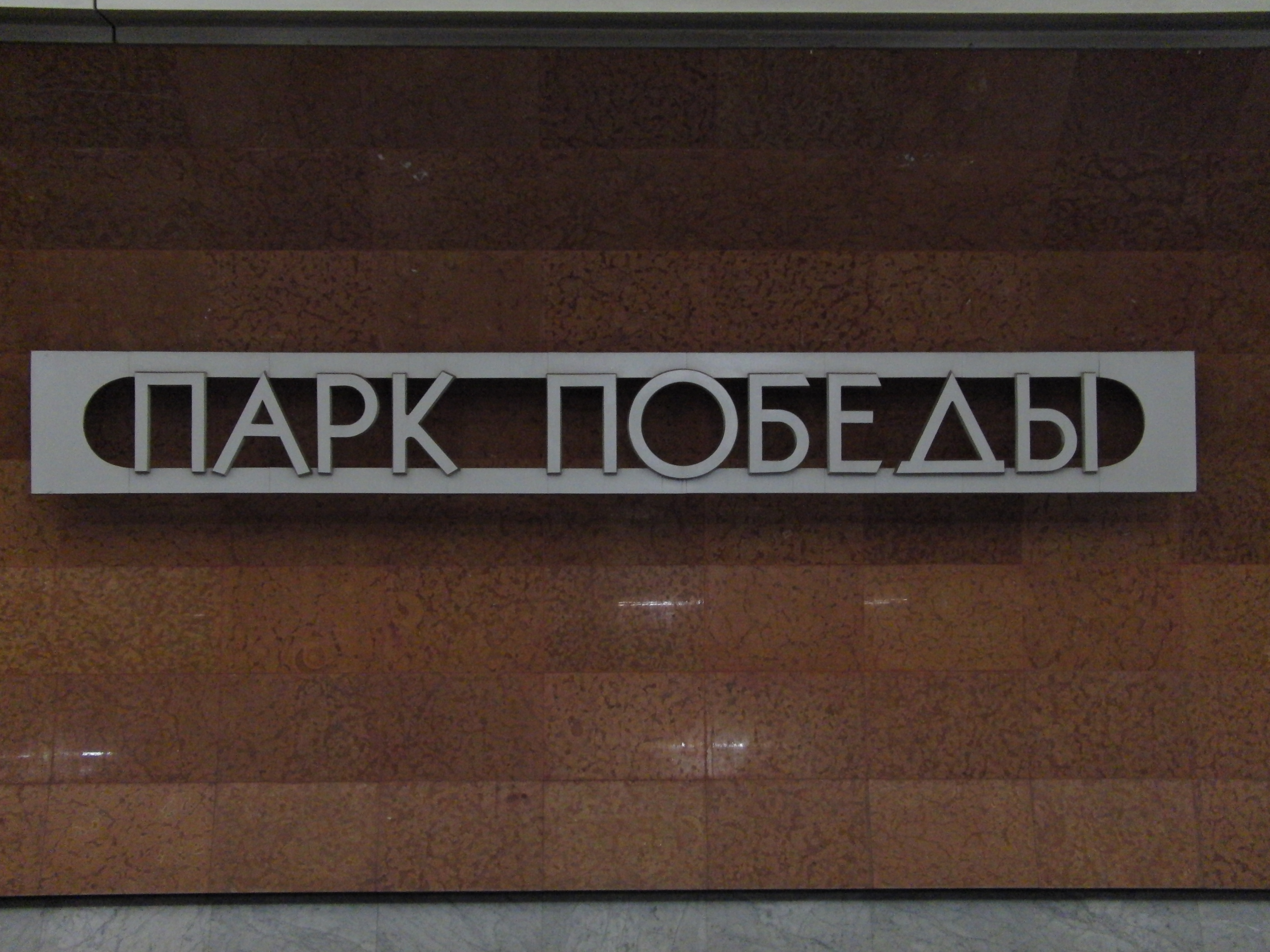
Station name
