= Lyceum 1533 (LIT) =

- Школа No. 1533 "ЛИТ"
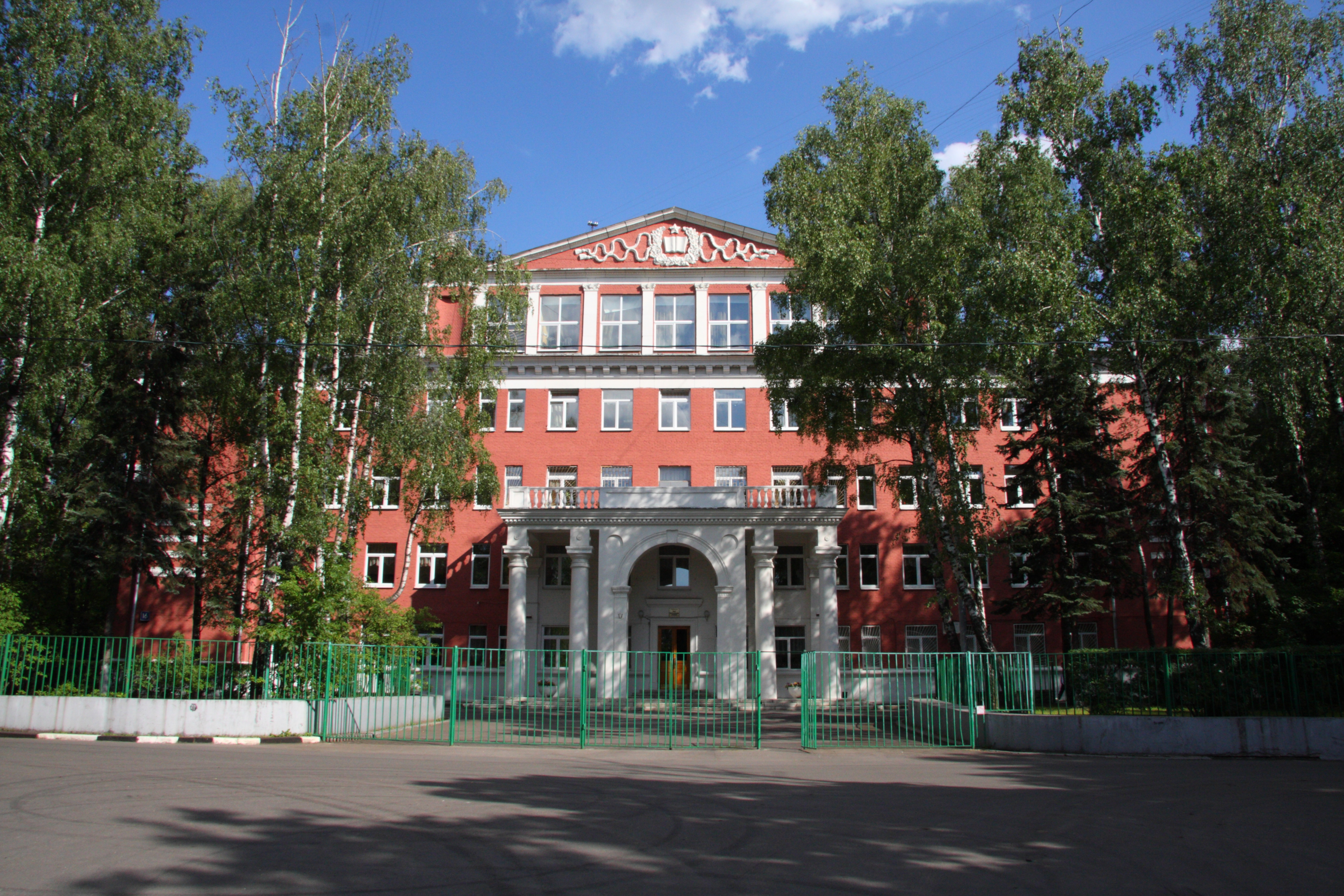

Location
- Main building - Lomonosovsky Prospekt, 16; Moscow; Russia
- Coordinates: 55.6923°N 37.5437°E

Information
- Established: 1991
- Specialists: Programmer; Computer graphics; Information management
- Director: Shirokov Dmitry Vladimirovich
- Language: Russian
- Website: https://www.lit.msu.ru; https://lyc1533.mskobr.ru

Lyceum No. 1533 "LIT" (also known as Information Technology Lyceum, Russian: Школа №1533 "ЛИТ" или "Лицей Информационных Технологий") — school in Moscow established in 1991 and providing education in Information technology specialization. Since 1992 LIT is a UNESCO associated school (UNESCO ASPNet). Lyceum is one of the leading schools in Russia.
