= Aminyevskaya (Moscow Metro) =

Moscow Metro station

Aminyevskaya Аминьевская
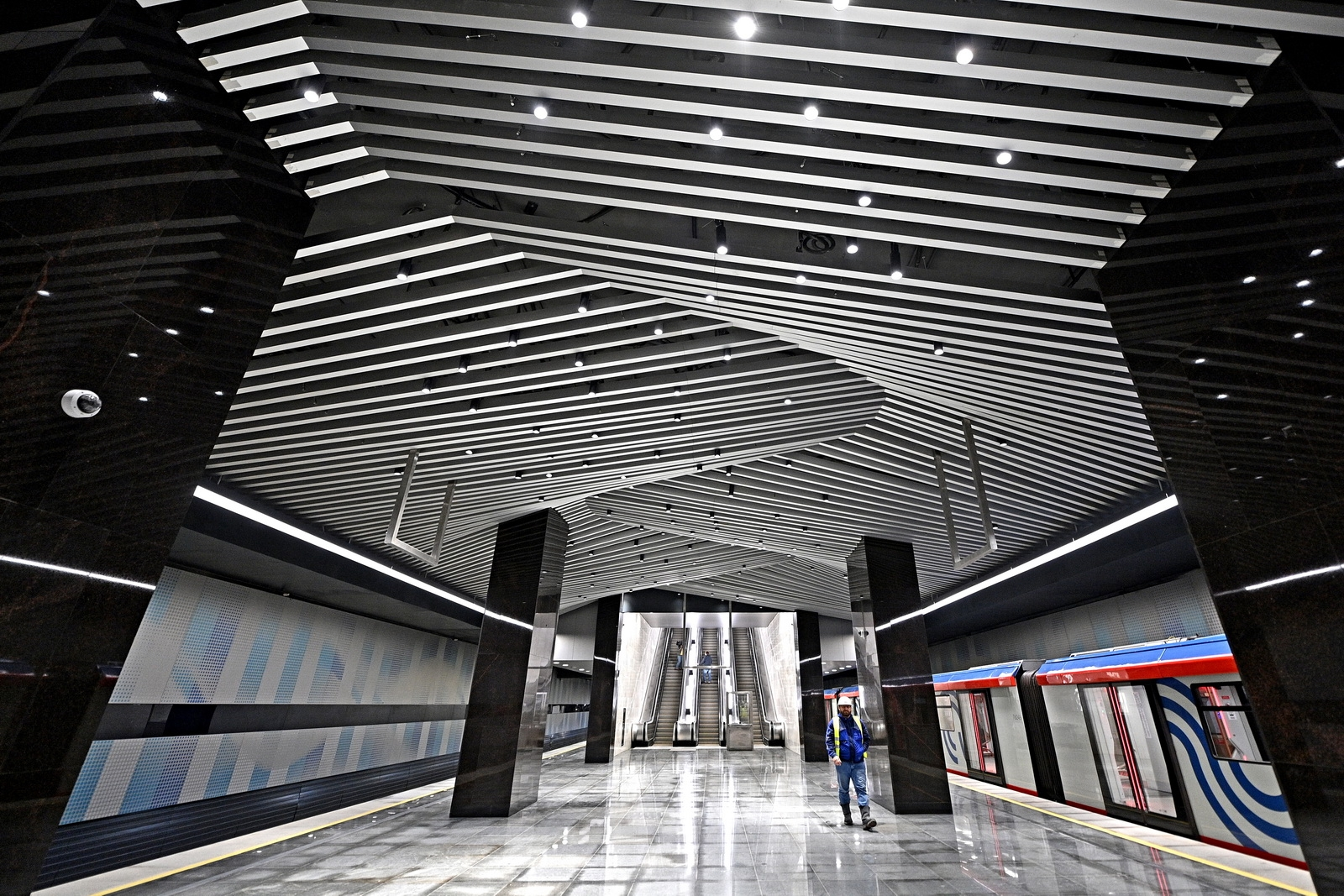
- Aminyevskaya - station hall

General information
- Location: Ochakovo-Matveyevskoye District, Western Administrative Okrug; Moscow; Russia
- Coordinates: 55.6972°N 37.4642°E
- System: Moscow Metro station
- Owner: Moskovsky Metropoliten
- Line: Bolshaya Koltsevaya line
- Platforms: 1 island platform
- Tracks: 2

Construction
- Structure type: Shallow column station
- Depth: 14 metres (46 ft)
- Platform levels: 1

History
- Opened: 7 December 2021; 4 years ago

Services
Preceding station	Moscow Metro	Following station
Michurinsky Prospekt anticlockwise / outer	Bolshaya Koltsevaya line	Davydkovo clockwise / inner
Route map
Bolshaya Koltsevaya line
Location
- Location within Moscow Metro

Aminyevskaya (Russian: Аминьевская) is a station on the Bolshaya Koltsevaya line of the Moscow Metro. It was opened on 7 December 2021 as part of the section between Mnyovniki and Kakhovskaya.

On the same day as the station, the eponymous railway station was opened, which has an interchange with the metro station.
