= Ramenki (rural locality) =

Ramenki (Russian: Раменки) is the name of several rural localities in Russia:

- Ramenki, Moscow Oblast, a selo in Ramenskoye Rural Settlement of Yegoryevsky District of Moscow Oblast
- Ramenki, Ryazan Oblast, a village in Fedyakinsky Rural Okrug of Rybnovsky District of Ryazan Oblast
- Ramenki, Tver Oblast, a village in Torzhoksky District of Tver Oblast
