= Kalininsko-Solntsevskaya line =

Moscow Metro line

Kalininskaya line Solntsevskaya line

Overview
- Owner: Moskovsky Metropoliten
- Locale: Moscow
- Termini: East section: Tretyakovskaya – Novokosino; West section: Delovoy Tsentr – Aeroport Vnukovo
- Stations: East section: 8; West section: 14

Service
- Type: Rapid transit
- System: Moscow Metro
- Operator: Moskovsky Metropoliten
- Rolling stock: 81-760/761
- Daily ridership: 452,000 (east section)

History
- Opened: 30 December 1979; 46 years ago
- Last extension: 2023

Technical
- Line length: East section: 16.3 km (10.1 mi); West section: 30.9 km (19.2 mi)
- Character: Underground
- Track gauge: 1,520 mm (4 ft 11 27/32 in)
- Electrification: Third rail

The Kalininsko-Solntsevskaya line (Кали́нинско-Со́лнцевская ли́ния, IPA: [kəˈlʲinʲɪnskə ˈsontsəfskəjə ˈlʲinʲɪjə]) (Line 8; Yellow Line) is a line of the Moscow Metro system in Moscow, Russia, currently consisting of two separate parts. It was opened as the eastwards Kalininskaya line in 1979, with the first stations of the western Solntsevsky radius opening in 2014. Presently, there are 8 stations on the eastern section and 14 on the western section. The two parts are planned to be joined after 2023. To distinguish the 2 sections, the newer west section is identified as the Line 8A or Solntsevskaya Line.

== History ==
The line's pilot stage, which would see it extending from Taganskaya through Lefortovo and into the eastern districts of Perovo, Novogireevo and Veshnyaki, was opened for the 1980 Moscow Olympics. The line bears all traits of the late 1970s architecture and engineering. No longer pressed for economy designs and aesthetics, the architects were given full freedom to use advanced materials.

The engineers were able to introduce new designs, particularly for the Column stations of Marksistskaya and Aviamotornaya which were built without ventral crosspieces, allowing a huge economy in time by abandoning the use of tubings. The shallow column station of Novogireevo further demonstrated its parting with previous centipede roots by increasing inter-column width from six to seven and a half metres.

What makes the line unique is its name, as it was originally named after partially passing the Kalinin District, which disappeared in the 1990s. Thus, the line is the only in Moscow which carries the name of a figurehead, Mikhail Kalinin, rather than the area it serves.

In 1986, the line's first extension opened, with the station Tretyakovskaya, the third cross-platform transfer in Moscow Metro was set up this way. It was planned for the line to continue and link up with the Arbatskaya station of the Arbatsko-Pokrovskaya line, allowing it to be split and the old route Aleksandrovsky Sad—Ploshchad Revolyutsii route to be reused, whilst the Kalininskaya line, now operating to Kievskaya would extend southwestwards.

This was not to be realised, and the western extension plans stalled for more than two decades due to the financial instability of the 1990s and other priorities.

With the opening of the Bolshaya Koltsevaya line, the route changed to include the new stations and the temporary but indefinite closure of Delovoy Tsentr. On February 24, Delovoy Tsentr on the Kalininsko-Solntsevskaya line closed, while on February 26, Delovoy Tsentr on the Bolshaya Koltsevaya line opened. Trains from Ramenki now continue north onto the Bolshaya Koltsevaya line at Shelepikha to Petrovsky Park.

The original route of the line through Delovoy Tsentr reflected the fact that the Solntsevskaya branch does not have an active rail yard. Trains would shift from that station to the Arbatsko-Pokrovskaya line and onward to the Izmailovo yard. As the Bolshaya Koltsevaya line uses the Izmailovo yard, trains can operate along the new route to Petrovsky Park and onward to the yard. In the meantime, there is no timeline for Delovoy Tsentr to reopen. However, it could be several years as completion of the central branch of the line to Tretyakovskaya has not yet begun.

== Passenger traffic ==
New stations opened on 6 September 2023 were used 113,000 times in a week.

=== Timeline ===
Segment	Date opened	Length
Marksistskaya–Novogireyevo	30 December 1979	11.4 km
Marksistskaya–Tretyakovskaya	25 January 1986	1.7 km
Novogireyevo–Novokosino	30 August 2012	3.2 km
Park Pobedy–Delovoy Tsentr (Note: The section from Park Pobedy to Delovoy Tsentr is currently disused from passenger service until the eastern and western sections are connected.)	31 January 2014	2.4 km
Park Pobedy–Ramenki	16 March 2017	7.4 km
Ramenki–Rasskazovka	30 August 2018	15.0 km
Rasskazovka–Aeroport Vnukovo	6 September 2023	5.5 km
Total (Note: Not accounting the shared tracks of western section with Bolshaya Koltsevaya line from Savyolovskaya to Shelepikha. This reroute is expected to be temporary.)		36.6 km

== Stations ==
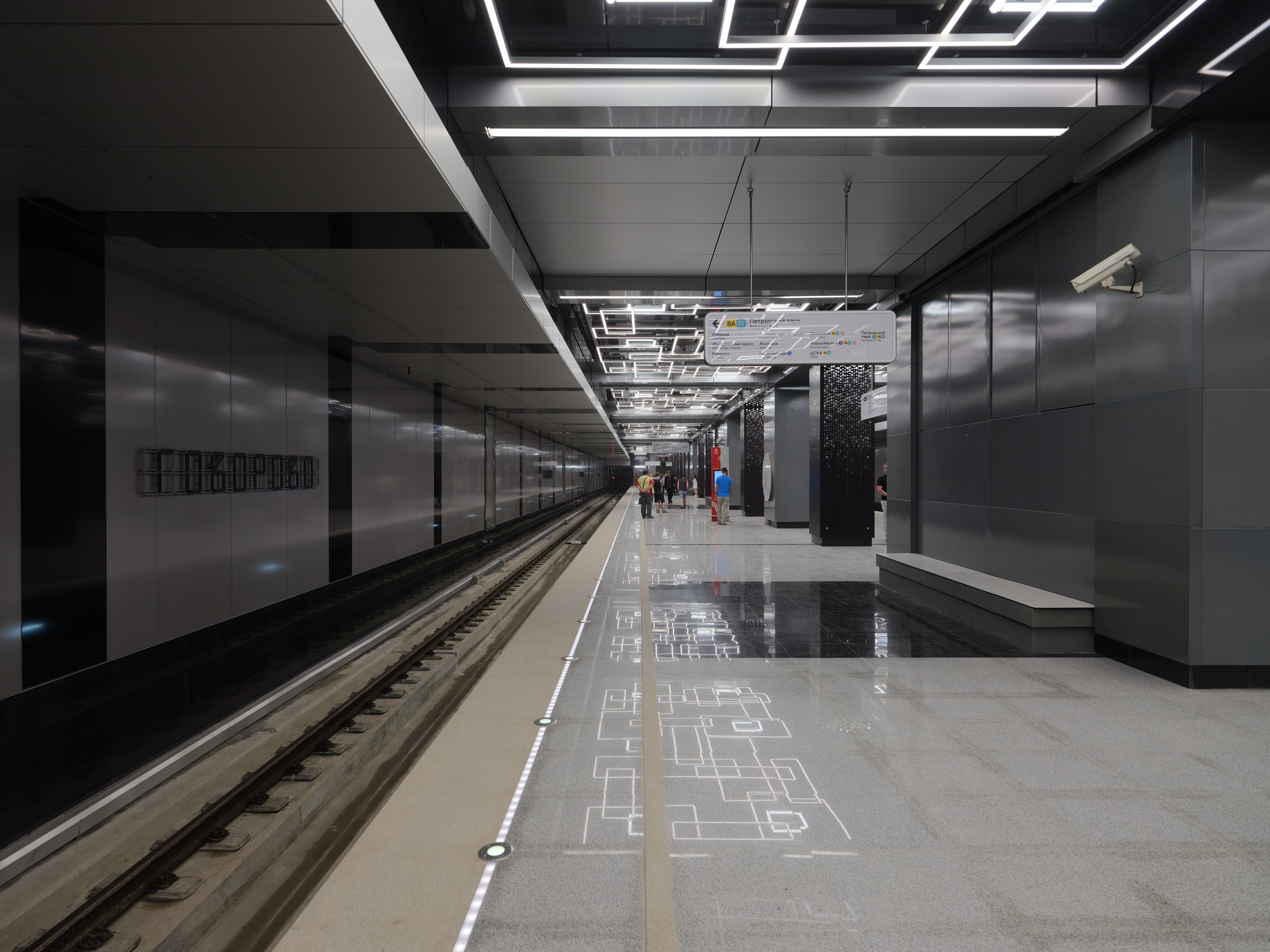
Platform at Govorovo station

Station Name		Transfers	Notes
English	Russian	Transfers	Notes
Novokosino	Новокосино	Reutovo	terminus
Novogireyevo	Новогиреево		
Perovo	Перово		
Shosse Entuziastov	Шоссе Энтузиастов	Shosse Entuziastov	
Aviamotornaya	Авиамоторная	Aviamotornaya; Aviamotornaya	
Ploshchad Ilyicha	Площадь Ильича	Rimskaya; Serp i Molot	
Marksistskaya	Марксистская	Taganskaya; Taganskaya	
Tretyakovskaya	Третьяковская	Novokuznetskaya; Tretyakovskaya	terminus
Volkhonka	Волхонка	Kropotkinskaya	
Plyushchikha	Плющиха	Smolenskaya	
Dorogomilovskaya	Дорогомиловская		
Delovoy Tsentr	Деловой центр	Delovoy Tsentr; Delovoy Tsentr	terminus
Park Pobedy	Парк Победы	Park Pobedy; Poklonnaya Gora	↑ Through service to Savyolovskaya in 2018–2020
Minskaya	Минская	Minskaya	
Lomonosovsky Prospekt	Ломоносовский проспект		
Ramenki	Раменки		
Michurinsky Prospekt	Мичуринский проспект	Michurinsky Prospekt	
Ozyornaya	Озёрная		
Govorovo	Говорово		
Solntsevo	Солнцево		
Borovskoye Shosse	Боровское шоссе		
Novoperedelkino	Новопеределкино		
Rasskazovka	Рассказовка		
Pykhtino	Пыхтино		
Aeroport Vnukovo	Аэропорт Внуково		terminus

== Rolling stock ==
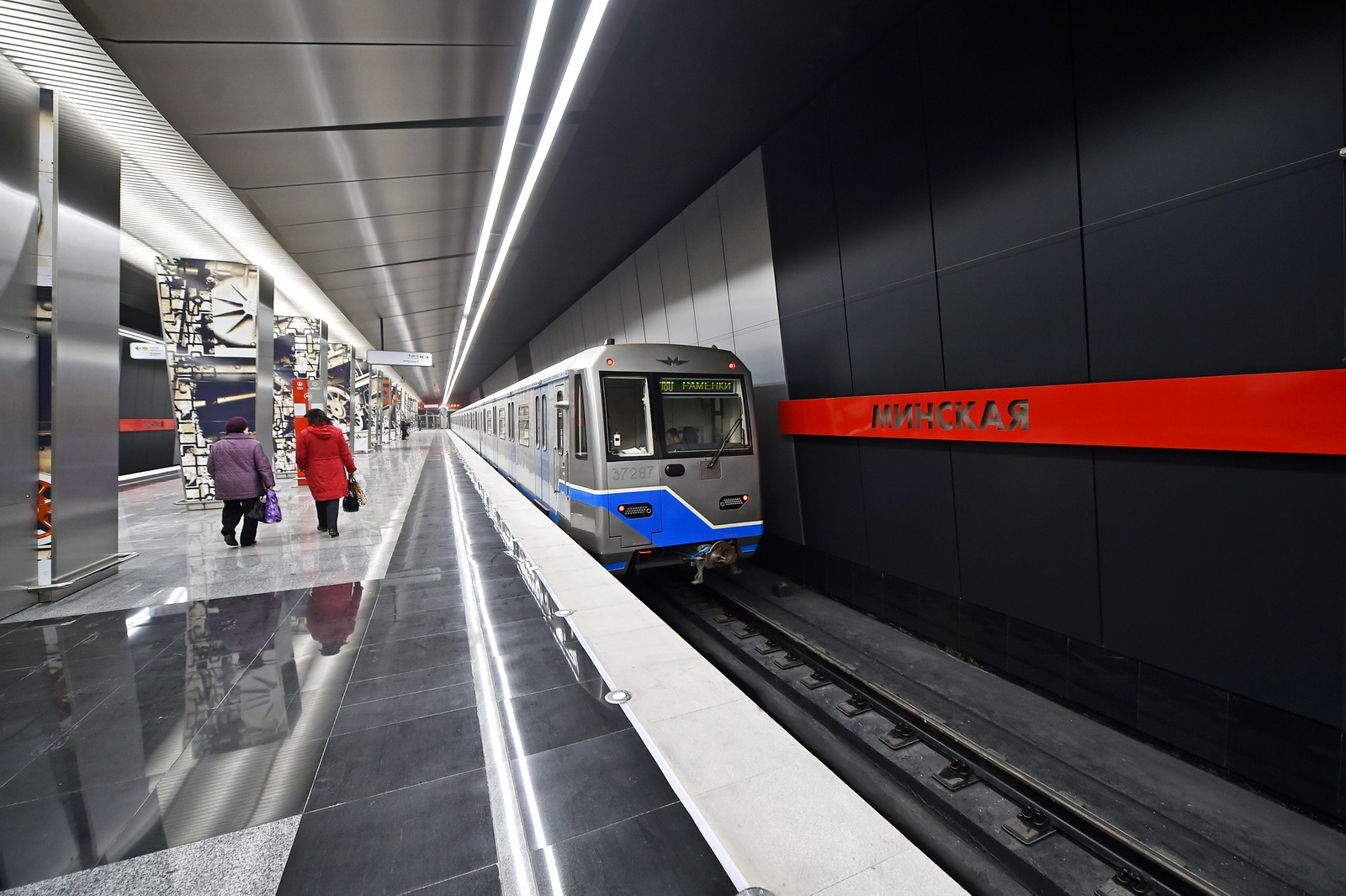
81-760/761 series train at Minskaya station

The line is served by the Novogireevo depot (No. 12). 36 eight-carriage trains of the newest 81-760/761 model are running on the line. It was also served by one new 81-717.6K/714.6K eight-carriage train in 2007–2011 and by two 81-717.5M/714.5M in 2009–2011, but the most trains till 2012 were old 81-717/714, built between 1979 and 1983. In 2012–2013 all 81-717/714 trains were replaced by new 81-760/761 (called "Oka") trains. The last 81-717/714 train emerged on the line in April 2013.

Subway car types used on the line over the years:

Series 81-717: 1979 — 2013

Series 81-717.5M: 2009 — 2011

Series 81-717.6К: 2009 — 2011

Series 81-760/761: April 2012 — present

Series 81-760A/761A: 2023–present

Series 81-765.3/766.3/767.3: 2018 — 2021

Series 81-765.4/766.4/767.4: 2019 — 2021

== Recent developments and future plans ==
The line currently exists as a single radial, but for a long time an extension through the city centre and then on westwards has been planned.

=== Perovsky radial ===
Novokosino was completed in 2012. There is a connection linking the Aviamotornaya Kalininskaya line station to Aviamotornaya on the Bolshaya Koltsevaya line.

=== Solntsevsky radial ===
The first part of the Solntsevsky radial, between Park Pobedy and Delovoy Tsentr (with a transfer to Vystavochnaya), opened in January 2014. It is not yet connected to the rest of Kalininskaya line. A further extension of this line further south from Park Pobedy to Ramenki was opened on 16 March 2017. The terminus Rasskazovka, about 5 kilometres (3.1 mi) from Vnukovo International Airport.

An extension taking the line toward Vnukovo International Airport was opened on 6 September 2023.

=== City center ===
The gap between Delovoy Tsentr and Tretyakovskaya is planned to be connected via the city center after 2023.

The planned stations on this route are (from east to west):

- Volkhonka (with a transfer to Kropotkinskaya on the Sokolnicheskaya line)
- Plyushchikha (with a transfer to Smolenskaya on the Arbatsko-Pokrovskaya line)
- Dorogomilovskaya (with a possibility of constructing a new transfer station at Koltsevaya line)
