= Rasskazovka =

Moscow Metro station

Rasskazovka Рассказовка
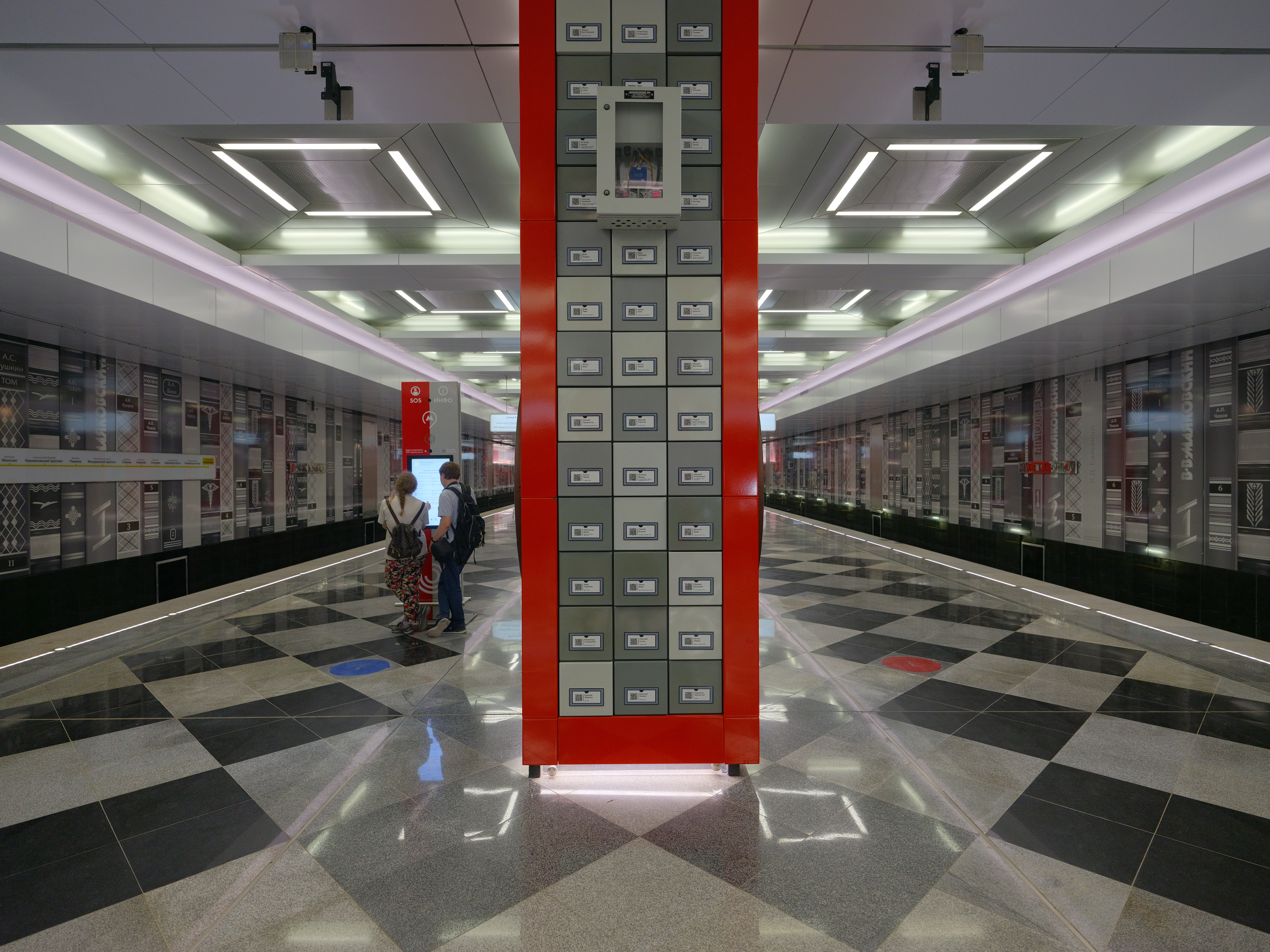

General information
- Location: Vnukovo District, Western Administrative Okrug; Moscow; Russia
- Coordinates: 55.6330°N 37.3328°E
- System: Moscow Metro station
- Owner: Moskovsky Metropoliten
- Line: Solntsevskaya line
- Platforms: 1 island platform

Construction
- Structure type: Two-span shallow-column station
- Platform levels: 1
- Parking: No

History
- Opened: 30 August 2018

Services
Preceding station	Moscow Metro	Following station
Pykhtino towards Aeroport Vnukovo	Kalininsko-Solntsevskaya line (Solntsevsky radius)	Novoperedelkino towards Delovoy Tsentr
Route map
Kalininskaya line
Location
- Location within Moscow Metro

Rasskazovka (Russian: Рассказовка) is a station on the Kalininsko-Solntsevskaya line of the Moscow Metro. It opened on August 30, 2018 as part of the "Ramenki" - "Rasskazovka" extension.

== Construction ==
Excavation was due to start in September 2014, and by June 2015, work was under way on the construction of the main reinforced concrete structures and waterproofing the inner surface.

The first tunnel reached the station in November 2015, while the second tunnel was completed in February 2016. By October 2016, the station was 90% complete. The platforms were completed in June 2017. In May 2018, the metro station Rasskazovka is ready for commissioning.

== Location ==
Rasskazovka station is the station on the line between Pykhtino and Novoperedelkino. It is on Borovskoye Highway in the village of Rasskazovka in the Novomoskovsky Administrative Okrug of Moscow, bordering the district of Novo-Peredelkino. The station is about 5 km from Vnukovo Airport.
