= Ramenki (Moscow Metro) =

Moscow Metro station

Ramenki Раменки
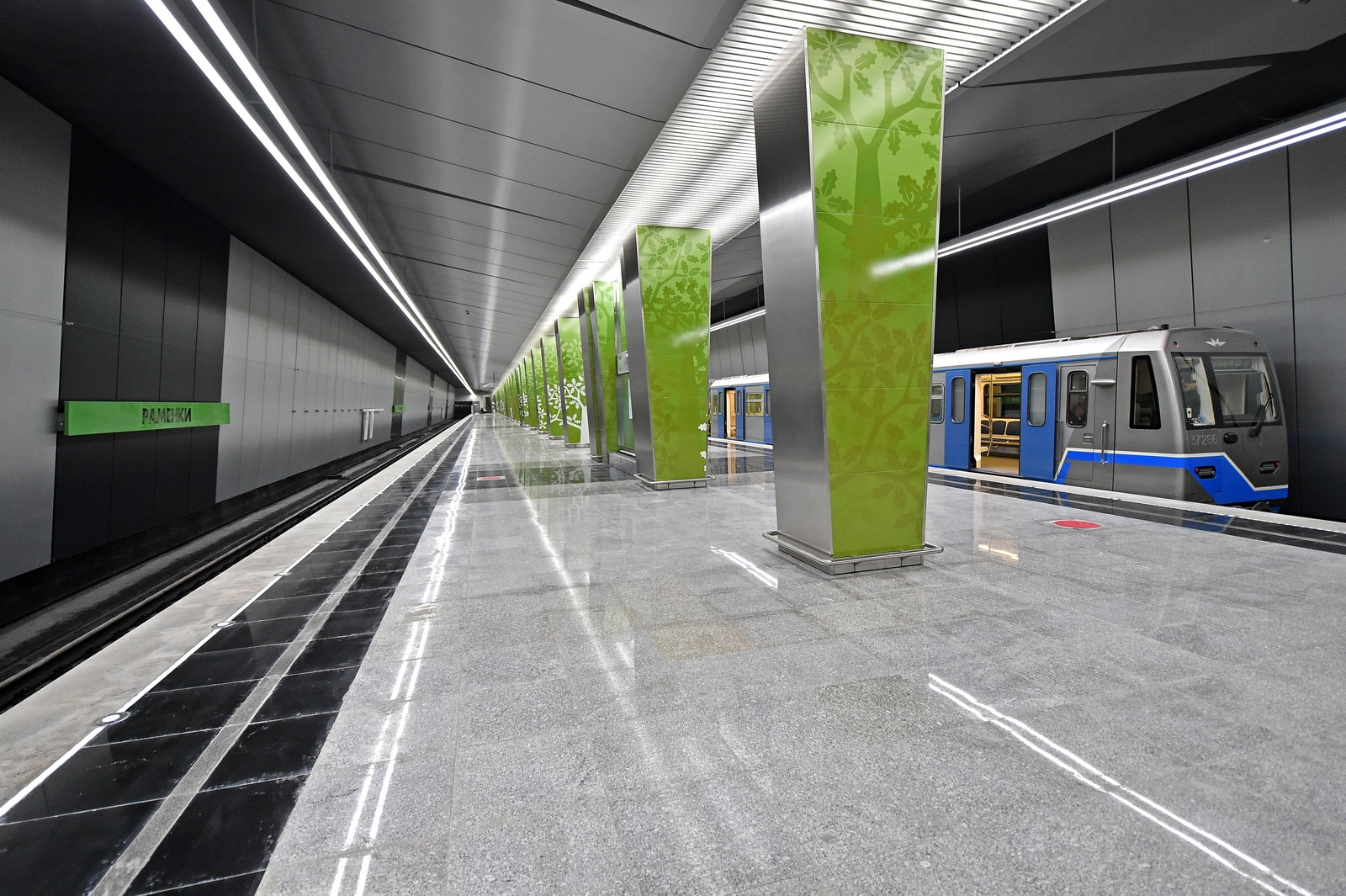

General information
- Location: Vinnitskaya Street, Ramenki District, Western Administrative Okrug; Moscow; Russia
- Coordinates: 55.6975°N 37.4984°E
- System: Moscow Metro station
- Owner: Moskovsky Metropoliten
- Line: Solntsevskaya line
- Platforms: 1 island platform

Construction
- Structure type: Two-span shallow-column station

History
- Opened: 16 March 2017

Services
Preceding station	Moscow Metro	Following station
Michurinsky Prospekt towards Aeroport Vnukovo	Kalininsko-Solntsevskaya line (Solntsevsky radius)	Lomonosovsky Prospekt towards Delovoy Tsentr
Route map
Solntsevskaya line
Location
- Location within Moscow Metro

Ramenki (Russian: Раменки) is a station on the Kalininsko-Solntsevskaya Line of the Moscow Metro. It opened on 16 March 2017 as part of the line's southwestward extension from Park Pobedy. Until 2018, with the opening of the extension to Rasskazovka, Ramenki served as the western terminus of the line. Tunnelling between the station and those preceding it and following it, Lomonosovsky Prospekt and Michurinsky Prospekt, began in 2013.

== History ==
Ramenki station was mentioned for the first time in 1965, when the Solntsevsky radius project was introduced, which at that time was supposed to be a continuation of the Arbat-Pokrovskaya line from the Kievskaya station. However, even the general scheme from 1938 for the development of the Moscow metro includes a promise for a Frunzensky radius station, designated approximately at the same location.

The station was provided for by the project of prolongation in Solntsevo of the Arbat-Pokrovskaya line from the station "Park Pobedy", developed by the institute "Metrogiprotrans" in the early 1990s. In the variant of the line trace along Minskaya street and Michurinsky avenue it was offered at the intersection with Vinnytsia street, and according to the variant of the tracing through the Matveyevsky station it was to be shifted 200 meters to the south-west. In both cases, Ramenki station was offered a shallow location. For the option of building a high-speed line Mytischi-Solntsevo of the chord line passing through the projected third station "Victory Park" (perpendicular to the two constructed) and facing the axis of Michurinsky Prospekt, the station in Ramenki was excluded in order to increase the speed characteristics.

The Solntsevskogo radius project of the mid-2000s was based on the first of these options, to name the station at the same time offered "Vinnitsa Street". According to the Kalinin-Solntsevskaya 2011 project, currently being implemented, the station under the name "Ramenki" is located under the lawn between the passing parts of Michurinsky Prospekt near Vinnitsa Street.

The construction site was fenced in the fourth quarter of 2011, and construction began in April 2012.

On 31 May 2013, the tunnelling of the left distillation tunnel started from the Ramenki station in the direction of Lomonosov Avenue with the help of the Svetlana TPMK. On 15 December 2013, it was left in the dismantling cell of Lomonosov Avenue, after which the right tunnel was drilled in the opposite direction on 17 December 2013, which also ended successfully on 2 July 2014. The length of the distance between the stations is 1189 meters.

== Commissioning ==
On 30 December 2016, Moscow Mayor Sergei Sobyanin conducted the technical launch of the metro station "Business Center" – "Ramenki" Kalininsk-Solntsevskaya line. From the beginning of 2017, a run-in of a new site without passengers was completed, with the completion of separate parts of the stations.

The initial plan was to open a new site for passengers shortly after the technical launch in February 2017, but the terms of running-in of the line and commissioning work were delayed by 2.5 months.

The opening of the passenger section, including the Ramenki station, which was on the temporary terminal line, took place on 16 March 2017.
