= Delovoy Tsentr (Kalininsko-Solntsevskaya line) =

Metro station in Moscow, Russia

Delovoy Tsentr Деловой центр
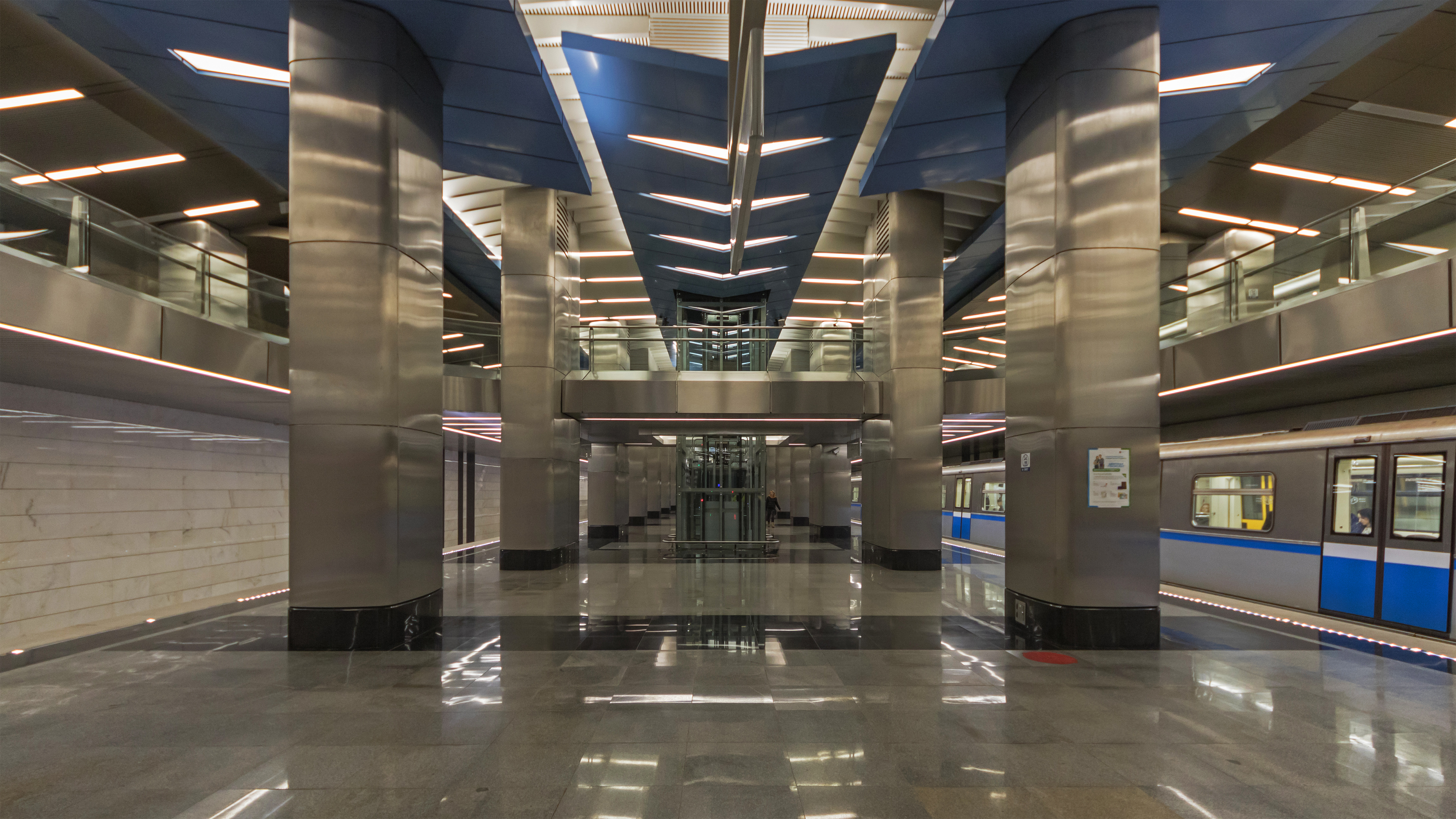

General information
- Location: Presnensky District; Central Administrative Okrug; Moscow; Russia
- Coordinates: 55.7491°N 37.5395°E
- System: Moscow Metro station
- Owner: Moskovsky Metropoliten
- Line: Kalininsko-Solntsevskaya line (Solntsevsky radius)
- Platforms: 1
- Tracks: 2

Construction
- Depth: 25 metres (82 ft)
- Parking: No

History
- Opened: 31 January 2014; 12 years ago 12 December 2020; 5 years ago (reopening)
- Closed: 24 February 2018; 8 years ago
- Rebuilt: 12 December 2020; 5 years ago

Services
Preceding station	Moscow Metro	Following station
Park Pobedy towards Aeroport Vnukovo	Kalininsko-Solntsevskaya line (Solntsevsky radius)	Terminus
Mezhdunarodnaya Terminus	Filyovskaya line (business centre branch) transfer at Delovoy Tsentr	Kiyevskaya towards Aleksandrovsky Sad
Shelepikha towards Ilyinskaya	Rublyovo-Arkhangelskaya line transfer at Delovoy Tsentr	Terminus
Route map
Location
- Location within Moscow Metro

Delovoy Tsentr (Russian: Деловой центр, lit. 'Business Center') is a station of the Moscow Metro's Kalininsko-Solntsevskaya line that opened on 31 January 2014. The station serves the Moscow International Business Center, after which it was named.

The station served as the terminus of the line until 2017. Services initially ran westward to Park Pobedy, but from 2017, the functioning line extended onward to Ramenki. This station closed on 24 February 2018 and reopened on 12 December 2020. While it was closed, trains on that line bypassed Delovoy Tsentr and ran directly to Shelepikha and then continued along the Bolshaya Koltsevaya line.

The original route of the Solntsevskaya branch of the line through Delovoy Tsentr reflected the fact that the branch does not have an active rail yard. Trains would shift from Delovoy Tsentr to the Arbatsko-Pokrovskaya line and onward to the Izmailovo yard. As the Bolshaya Koltsevaya line uses the Izmailovo yard, trains operate along the new route to Petrovsky Park and onward to the yard.
