= Aeroport Vnukovo (Moscow Metro) =

Moscow Metro station

Aeroport Vnukovo Аэропорт Внуково
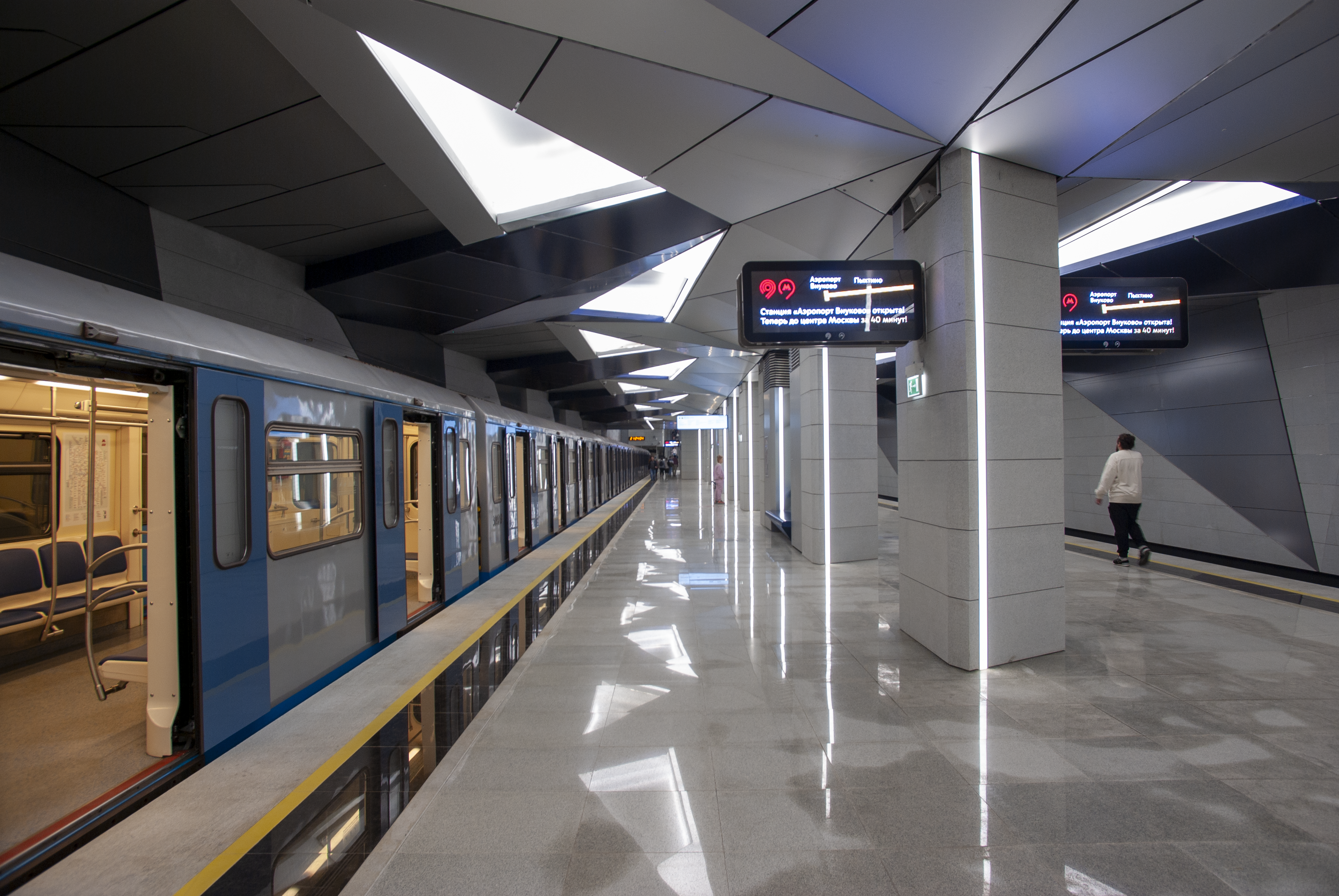

General information
- Location: Vnukovo District, Western Administrative Okrug; Moscow; Russia
- Coordinates: 55°36′24″N 37°17′18″E
- System: Moscow Metro station
- Owner: Moskovsky Metropoliten
- Line: Solntsevskaya line
- Platforms: 1 island platform

Construction
- Structure type: Underground

History
- Opened: 6 September 2023

Services
Preceding station	Moscow Metro	Following station
Terminus	Kalininsko-Solntsevskaya line (Solntsevsky radius)	Pykhtino towards Delovoy Tsentr
Location
- Location within Moscow Metro

Aeroport Vnukovo (Russian: Аэропорт Внуково) is a Moscow Metro station, the western terminus of the Kalininsko-Solntsevskaya line. The station serves the Vnukovo International Airport. It is the westernmost station on the Moscow Metro.

The station is located in Vnukovo International Airport.

On 10 February 2023 Moscow mayor, Sergey Sobyanin approved the name of the station as Aeroport Vnukovo («Аэропорт Внуково»). It was opened on 6 September 2023 as a part of the "Rasskazovka" — "Aeroport Vnukovo" extension along with the Pykhtino metro station.
