= Akademicheskaya (Troitskaya line) =

Moscow Metro station

Akademicheskaya Академическая
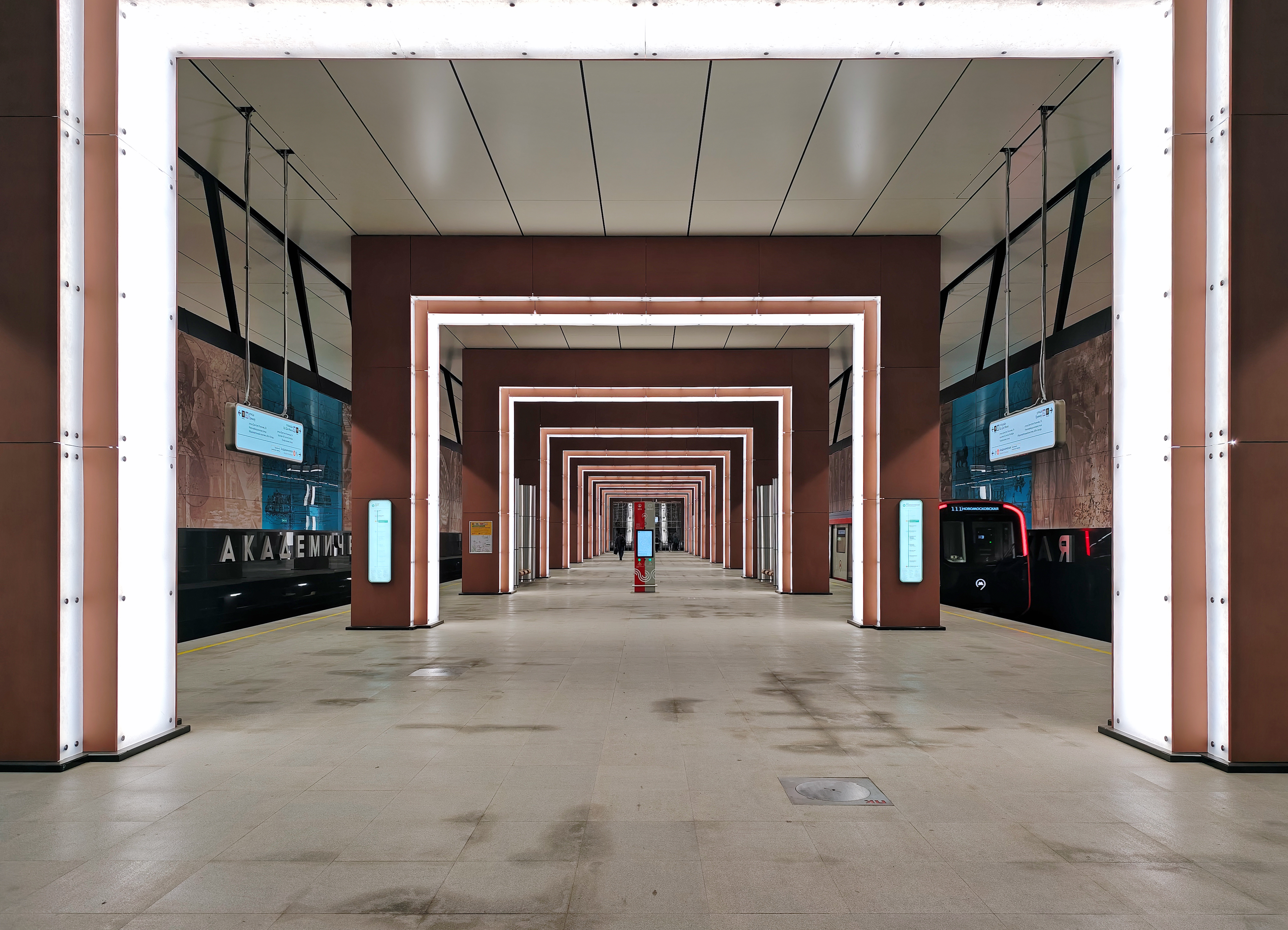
- Akademicheskaya station, platform

General information
- Location: Akademichesky District, SWAO; Moscow; Russia
- Coordinates: 55.687525°N 37.574251°E
- System: Moscow Metro station
- Owner: Moskovsky Metropoliten
- Line: Troitskaya line

Construction
- Structure type: Underground

History
- Opened: 13 September 2025

Services
Preceding station	Moscow Metro	Following station
Vavilovskaya towards Novomoskovskaya	Troitskaya line	Krymskaya towards Novatorskaya
Profsoyuznaya towards Novoyasenevskaya	Kaluzhsko-Rizhskaya line transfer at Akademicheskaya	Leninsky Prospekt towards Medvedkovo
Route map
Location
- Location within Moscow Metro

Akademicheskaya (Академическая) is a Moscow Metro station on the Troitskaya line. It was opened on 13 September 2025 as part of the northern extension of the line between Novatorskaya and ZIL. The station is located between Vavilovskaya and Krymskaya, with a transfer to the eponymous station of the Kaluzhsko-Rizhskaya line.

== History ==
The station was planned as part of a 6.5 km section of the Troitskaya line between Novatorskaya and Krymskaya with intermediate stations at Vavilovskaya and Akademicheskaya. Construction was initially scheduled to begin in 2020 and to be completed by 2024–2025.

In October 2020 the design project for the station was approved. The walls were planned to be decorated with graffiti inspired by classical antiquity, with a visual motif of "portals" extending along the platform.

== Opening ==
The station was inaugurated on 13 September 2025 together with Vavilovskaya, Krymskaya, and ZIL. The opening ceremony was attended by President Vladimir Putin and Moscow Mayor Sergey Sobyanin. Sobyanin noted that construction faced challenges due to dense central Moscow development and complex engineering conditions.

With the opening, the Troitskaya line reached 11 stations in operation.

== Design ==
Akademicheskaya is dedicated to the 300th anniversary of the Russian Academy of Sciences. Its design features illuminated columns and portrait panels of Russian scholars including Laurentius Blumentrost, Johann Schumacher, Nikolay Semyonov, and Vladimir Vernadsky.

The station has two underground vestibules, each providing access to both sides of Profsoyuznaya Street and Dmitriya Ulyanova Street.

In December 2025, the underground transfer hall and two more exits were opened.

== Location ==
The station is located in the Akademichesky District of the South-Western Administrative Okrug, near the intersection of Profsoyuznaya Street and Dmitriya Ulyanova Street.
