= Novatorskaya (Bolshaya Koltsevaya line) =

Moscow Metro station

Novatorskaya Новаторская
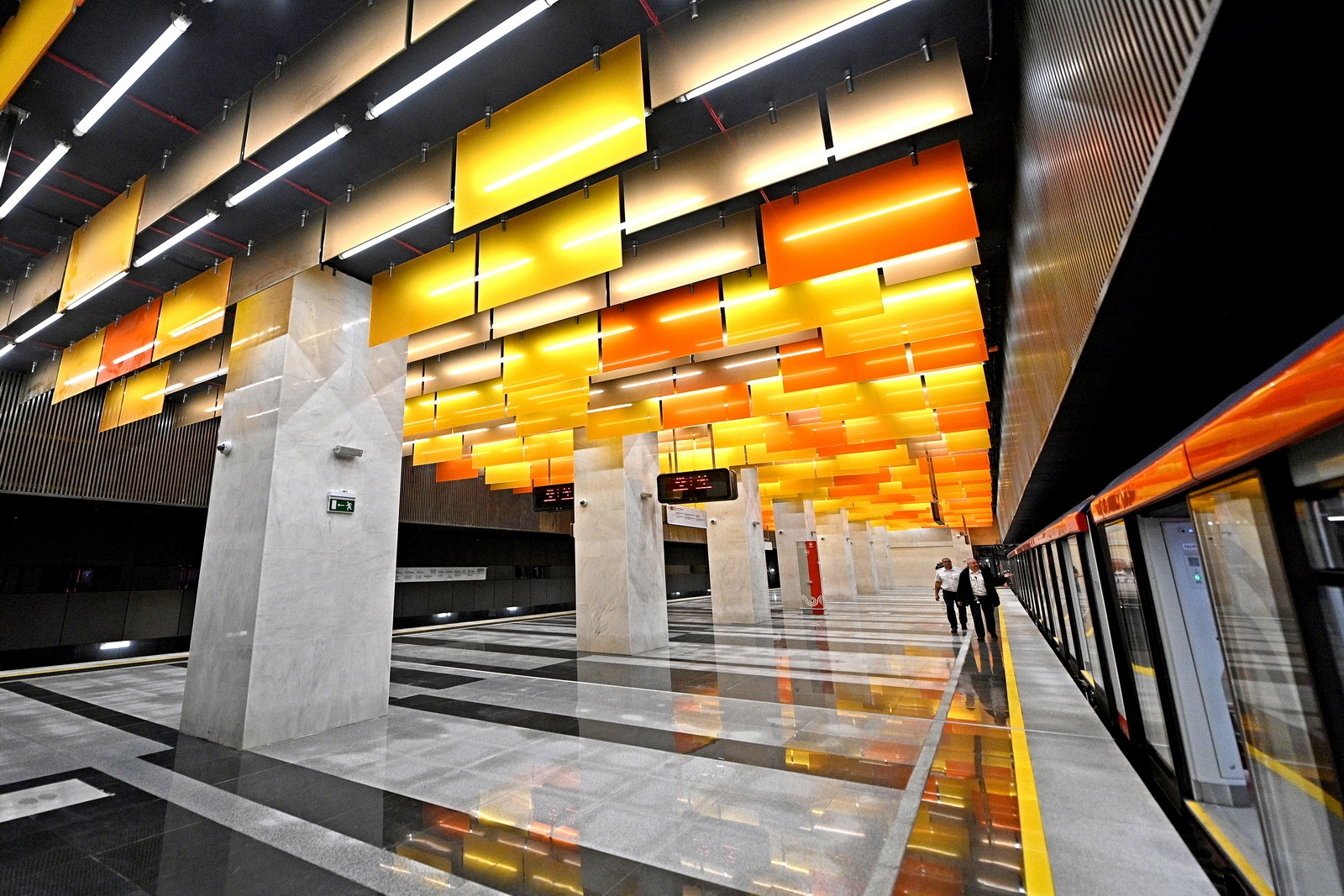
- Novatorskaya - station hall (4)

General information
- Location: Moscow; Russia
- Coordinates: 55.67008°N 37.52181°E
- System: Moscow Metro station
- Owner: Moskovsky Metropoliten
- Line: Bolshaya Koltsevaya line

History
- Opened: 7 December 2021; 4 years ago

Services
| Preceding station | Moscow Metro | Following station |
|---|---|---|
| Vorontsovskaya anticlockwise / outer | Bolshaya Koltsevaya line | Prospekt Vernadskogo clockwise / inner |
| Universitet Druzhby Narodov towards Novomoskovskaya | Troitskaya line transfer at Novatorskaya | Vavilovskaya towards Novatorskaya |
Route map
Bolshaya Koltsevaya line
Location
- Location within Moscow Metro

Novatorskaya (Russian: Новаторская) is a metro station on Bolshaya Koltsevaya line of the Moscow Metro, between Prospekt Vernadskogo and Vorontsovskaya. The name of the station derives from Novatorov Street as it is located at the interchange between Leninsky Avenue and Novatorov Street. The station was opened on 7 December 2021 as part of the section between Mnyovniki and Kakhovskaya.

On 7 September 2024, Moscow City Day, a transfer to Novatorskaya of Troitskaya line was opened.
