= Akademichesky =

Akademichesky (masculine), Akademicheskaya (feminine), or Akademicheskoye (neuter) may refer to:

- Akademichesky District, a district of South-Western Administrative Okrug of Moscow, Russia
- Akademicheskaya (Kaluzhsko-Rizhskaya line), a station on the Kaluzhsko-Rizhskaya line of the Moscow Metro, Moscow, Russia
- Akademicheskaya (Saint Petersburg Metro), a station of the Saint Petersburg Metro, Saint Petersburg, Russia
- Akademicheskoye Municipal Okrug, a municipal okrug of Kalininsky District of Saint Petersburg, Russia
