= Kornilovskaya =

Kornilovskaya may refer to:

- Kornilovskaya, a village in Arkhangelsk Oblast, Russia
- Kornilovskaya, a Moscow Metro station
