= Kommunarka (Moscow Metro) =

Moscow Metro station

Kommunarka Коммунарка
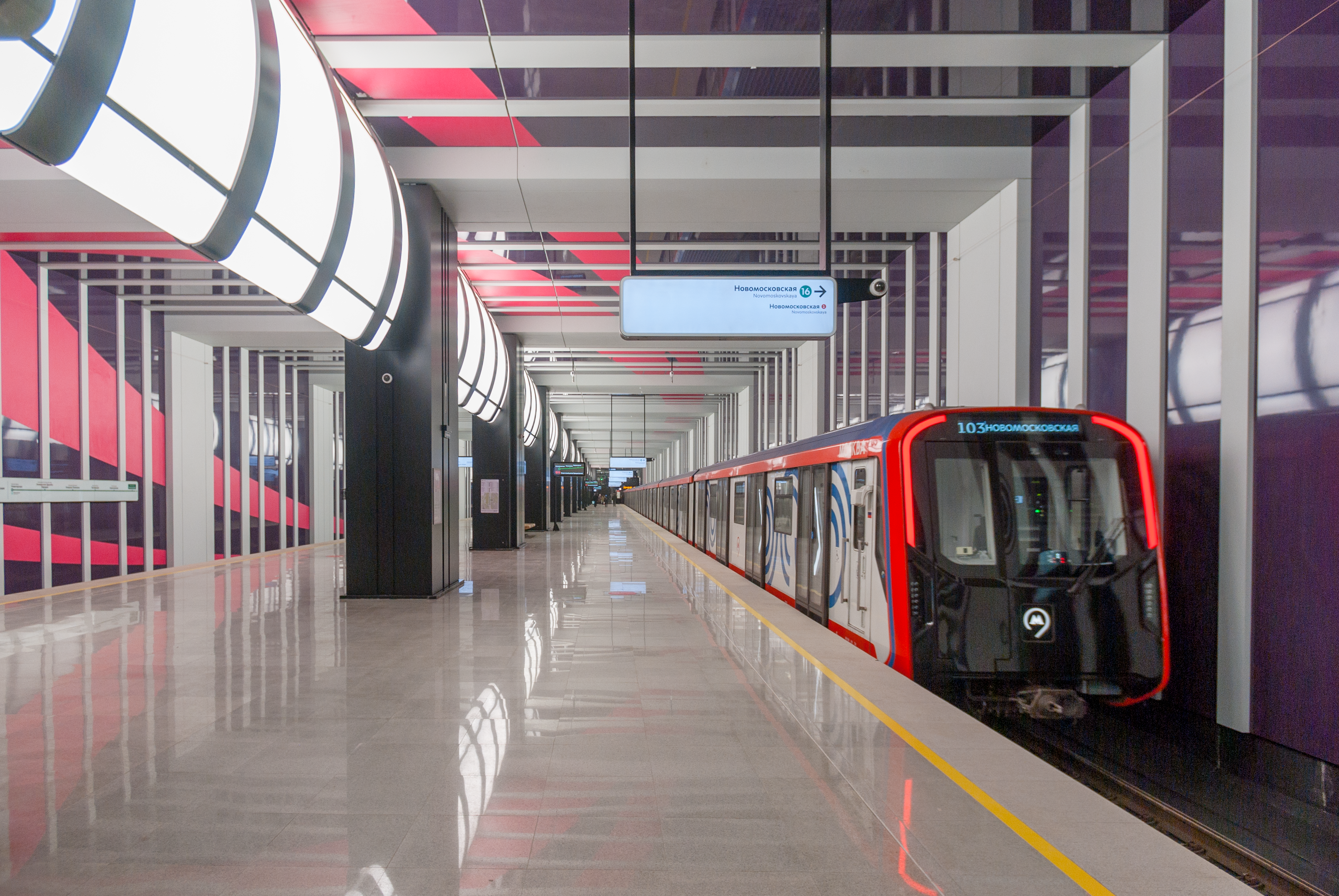
- Southbound train

General information
- Location: NAO; Moscow; Russia
- Coordinates: 55.57464°N 37.46798°E
- System: Moscow Metro station
- Owner: Moskovsky Metropoliten
- Line: Troitskaya line

History
- Opened: 28 December 2024

Services
Preceding station	Moscow Metro	Following station
Novomoskovskaya Terminus	Troitskaya line	Kornilovskaya towards Novatorskaya
Route map
Location
- Location within Moscow Metro

Kommunarka (Russian: Коммунарка) is a station on the Troitskaya line of the Moscow Metro. It was opened on 28 December 2024 as part of the three-station extension of the line, from Tyutchevskaya to Novomoskovskaya. The adjacent stations are Kornilovskaya and Novomoskovskaya.

Before 3 July 2024, the station was known as Bachurinskaya (Бачу́ринская). Kommunarka is the former name of Novomoskovskaya station.
