= Akademicheskaya (Kaluzhsko-Rizhskaya line) =

Moscow Metro station

Akademicheskaya Академическая
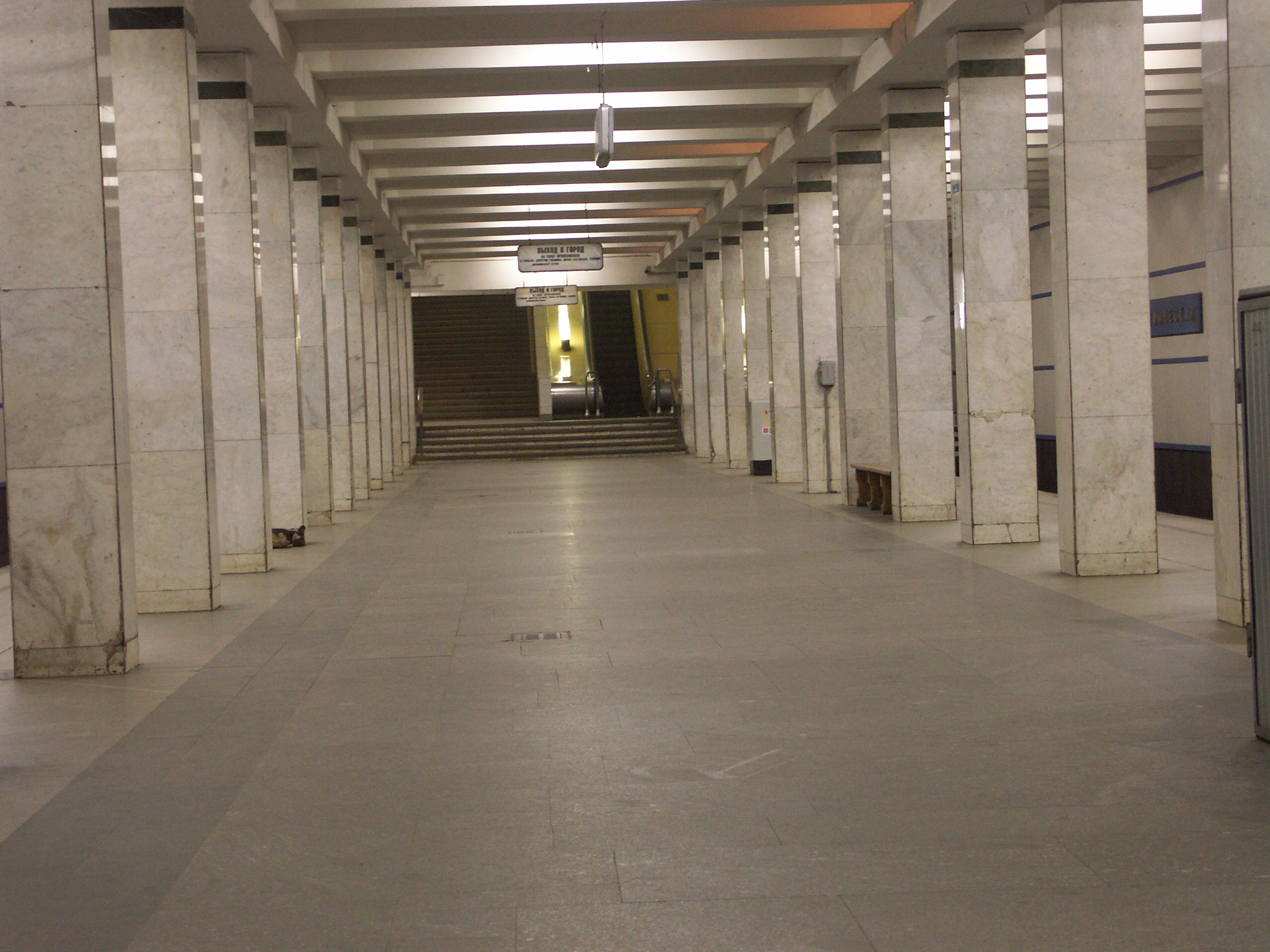
- Southern exit in 2006

General information
- Location: Akademichesky District; South-Western Administrative Okrug; Moscow; Russia
- Coordinates: 55.6877°N 37.5733°E
- System: Moscow Metro station
- Owner: Moskovsky Metropoliten
- Line: Kaluzhsko-Rizhskaya line
- Platforms: 1
- Tracks: 2

Construction
- Structure type: Underground
- Depth: 8.5 metres (28 ft)
- Platform levels: 1
- Parking: No

Other information
- Station code: 101

History
- Opened: 13 October 1962; 63 years ago

Passengers
- 2002: 24,601,000

Services
Preceding station	Moscow Metro	Following station
Profsoyuznaya towards Novoyasenevskaya	Kaluzhsko-Rizhskaya line	Leninsky Prospekt towards Medvedkovo
Vavilovskaya towards Novomoskovskaya	Troitskaya line transfer at Akademicheskaya	Krymskaya towards Novatorskaya
Route map
Location
- Location within Moscow Metro

Akademicheskaya (Russian: Академи́ческая, IPA: [ɐkədʲɪˈmʲitɕɪskəjə], English: Academy's) is a station on the Moscow Metro's Kaluzhsko-Rizhskaya Line.

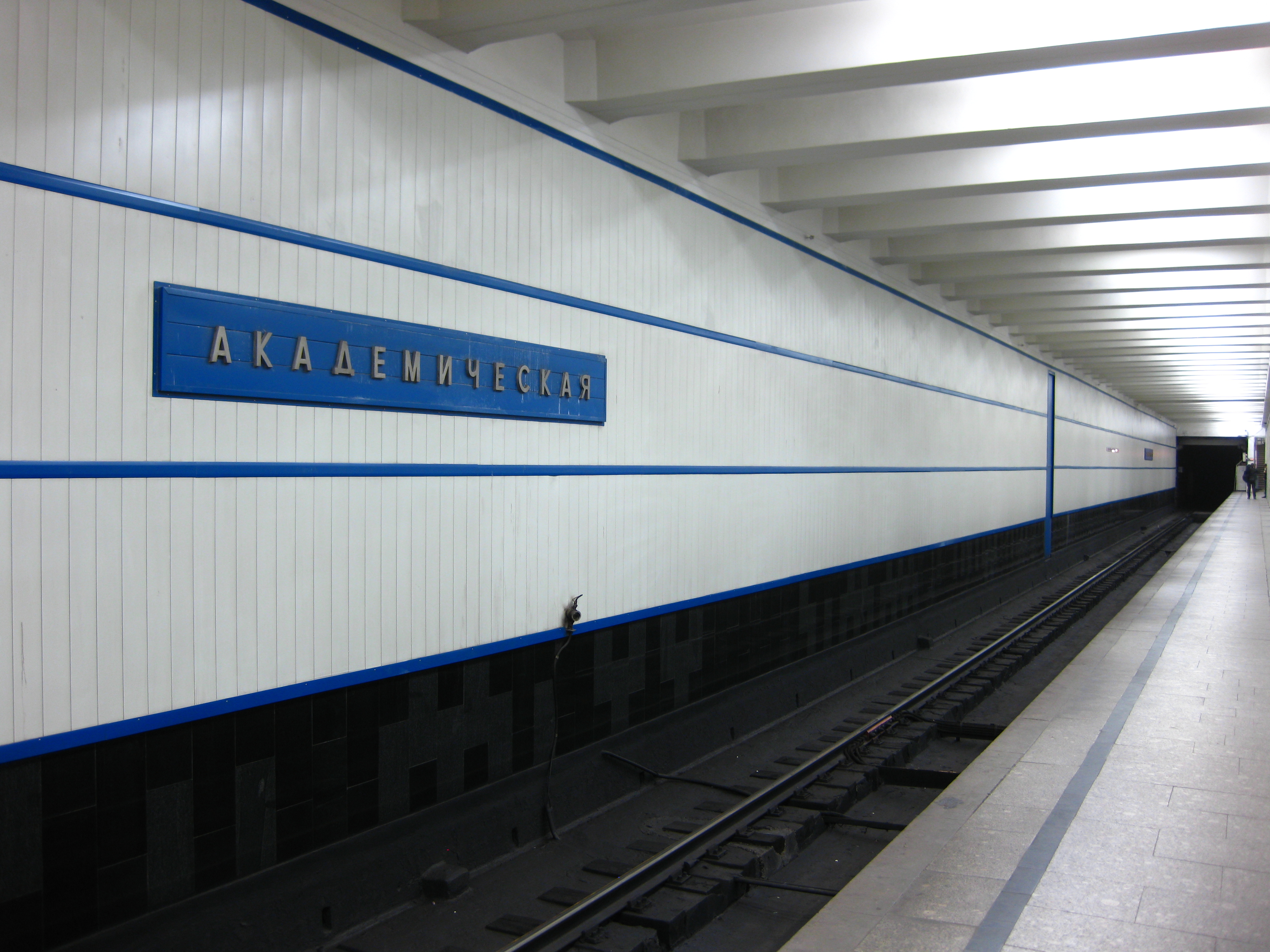
Platform of Akademicheskaya, 2009

The station is named for the several Akademichesky Proyezd streets formerly located nearby, which were themselves named after the Russian Academy of Sciences but have all been renamed since. Akademicheskaya opened on October 13, 1962, and was designed by Yuliya Kolesnikova, Petukhova, and Fokina. Built to the relatively new pillar-trispan design (aka Sorokonozhka, centipede), which became prevalent in the 1960s due to its low construction costs. The station has white marble pillars accented with a stripe of black marble near the top. The walls, originally faced with white tile with four horizontal blue stripes, were re-covered in 2003 with similarly coloured aluminium planes for a cleaner, more modern look.

The entrances to the station are located around Ho Chi Minh Square, at the intersection of Profsoyuznaya and Dmitriy Ulyanov streets. Currently the station serves 67,400 passengers daily.

In September 2025, a transfer to Akademicheskaya opened. The underground transfer tunnel was opened later, in December 2025.
