= Krymskaya (Troitskaya line) =

Moscow Metro station

Krymskaya Крымская
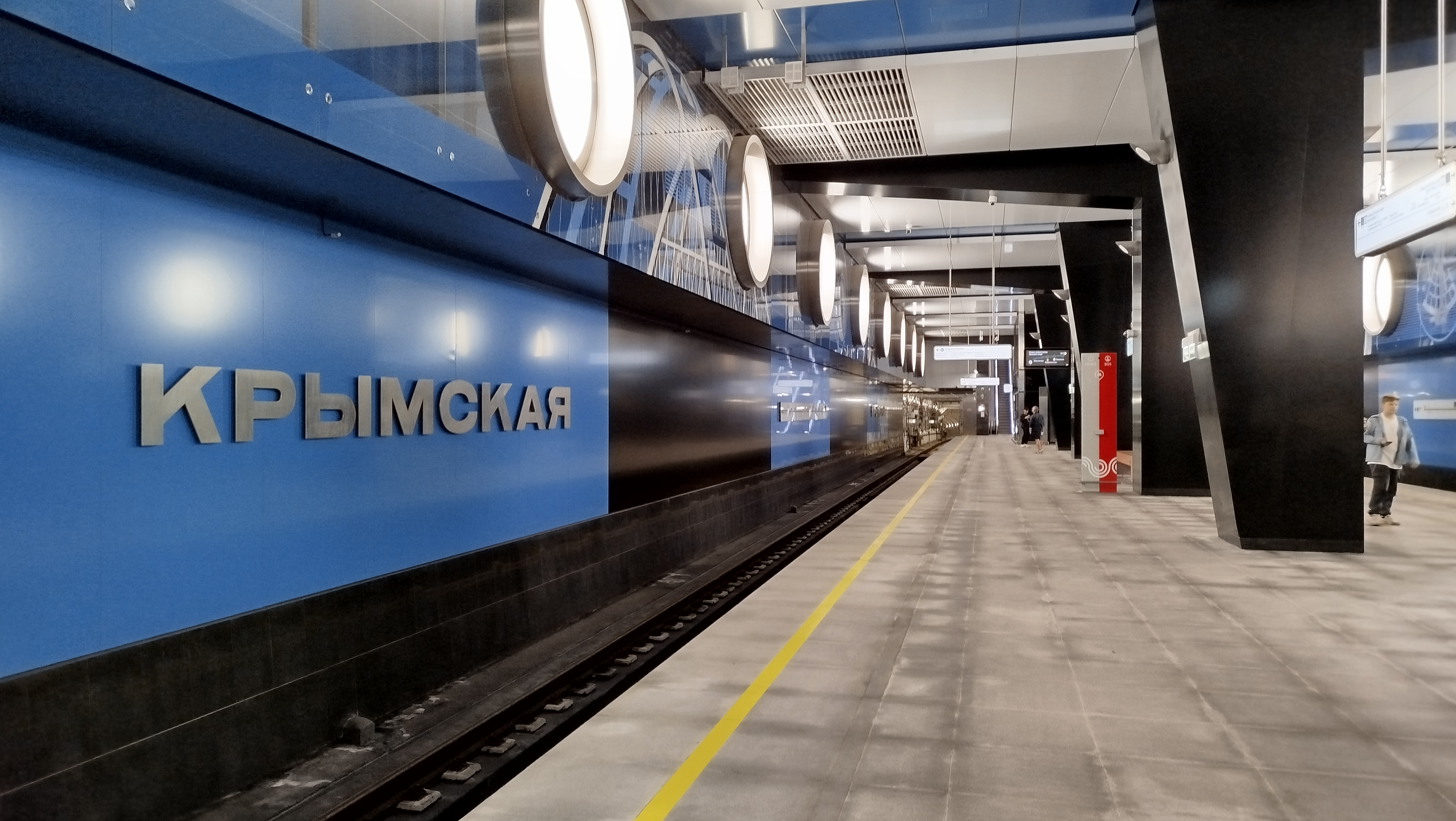

General information
- Location: Donskoy District, SAO; Moscow; Russia
- Coordinates: 55.689863°N 37.607424°E
- System: Moscow Metro station
- Owner: Moskovsky Metropoliten
- Line: Troitskaya line

History
- Opened: 13 September 2025

Services
Preceding station	Moscow Metro	Following station
Akademicheskaya towards Novomoskovskaya	Troitskaya line	ZIL towards Novatorskaya

Out-of-station interchange
Preceding station	Moscow Metro	Following station
Ploshchad Gagarina anticlockwise / outer	Moscow Central Circle transfer at Krymskaya	Verkhniye Kotly clockwise / inner
Route map
Location
- Location within Moscow Metro

Krymskaya (Russian: Крымская) is a Moscow Metro station on the Troitskaya line. It is opened on 13 September 2025 as part of the northern extension of the line, between Novatorskaya and ZIL. It is located between Akademicheskaya and ZIL. There will be a transfer to the eponymous station of the Moscow Central Circle.

The station is located next to Sevastopolsky Avenue.
