= ZIL (Moscow Central Circle) =

Station on the Moscow Central Circle

ZIL ЗИЛ
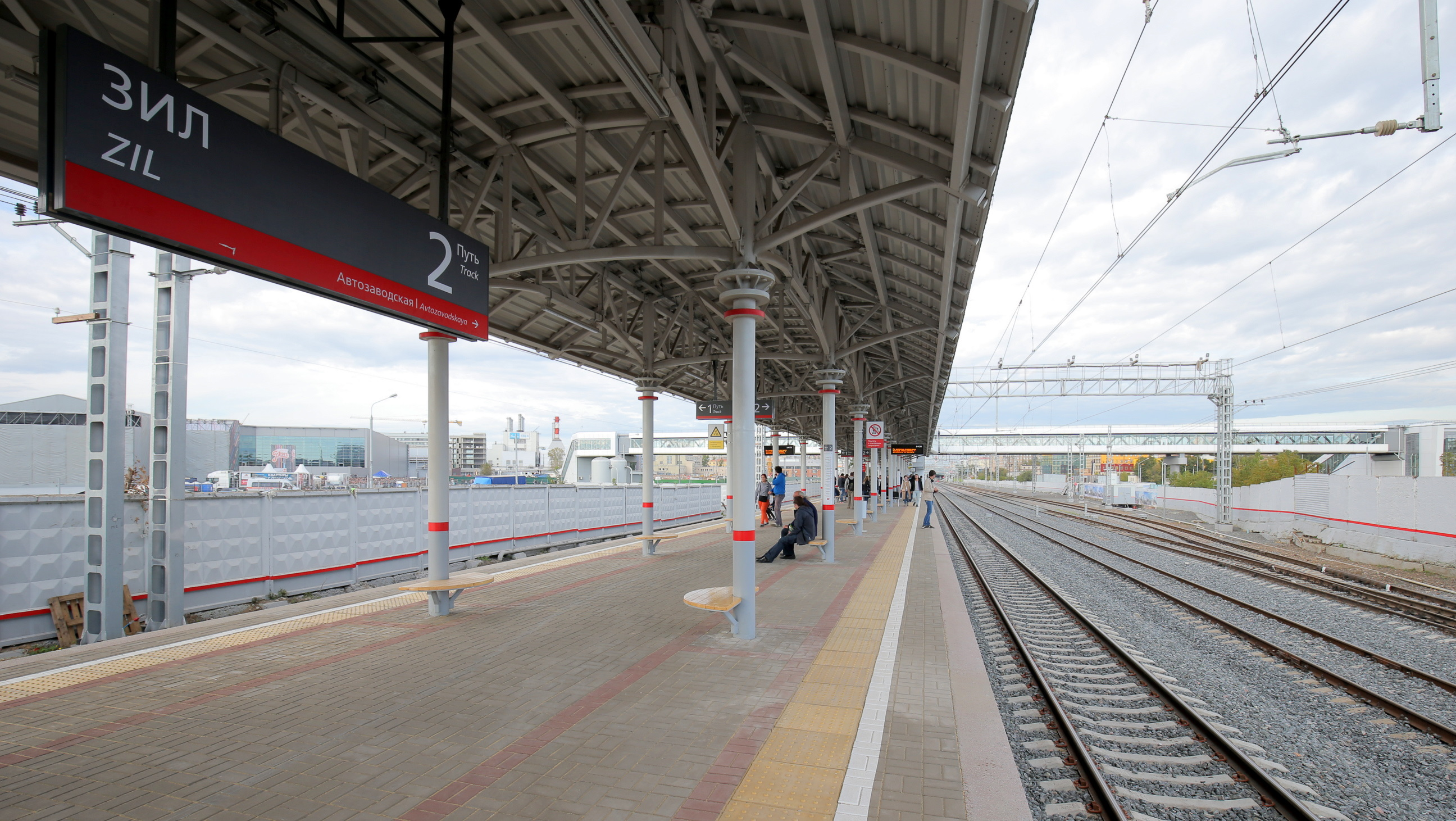

General information
- Coordinates: 55.6978°N 37.6474°E
- System: Moscow Metro
- Line: Moscow Central Circle
- Platforms: 1 island platform
- Tracks: 2

History
- Opened: 10 September 2016; 9 years ago

Services
Preceding station	Moscow Metro	Following station
Avtozavodskaya anticlockwise / outer	Moscow Central Circle	Verkhniye Kotly clockwise / inner

Out-of-station interchange
Preceding station	Moscow Metro	Following station
Krymskaya towards Novomoskovskaya	Troitskaya line transfer at ZIL	Terminus
Route map
Location
- Location within Moscow Metro

ZIL (Russian: ЗИЛ) is a station on the Moscow Central Circle of the Moscow Metro that opened in September 2016. The station is named for ZiL a former automobile manufacturer that operated on the site until 2012.

On 13 September 2025, a transfer to the eponymous station of the Troitskaya line has opened and a transfer to the Biryulyovskaya line in 2028 is planned.
