= Nagatinskaya =

Moscow Metro station

Nagatinskaya Нагатинская
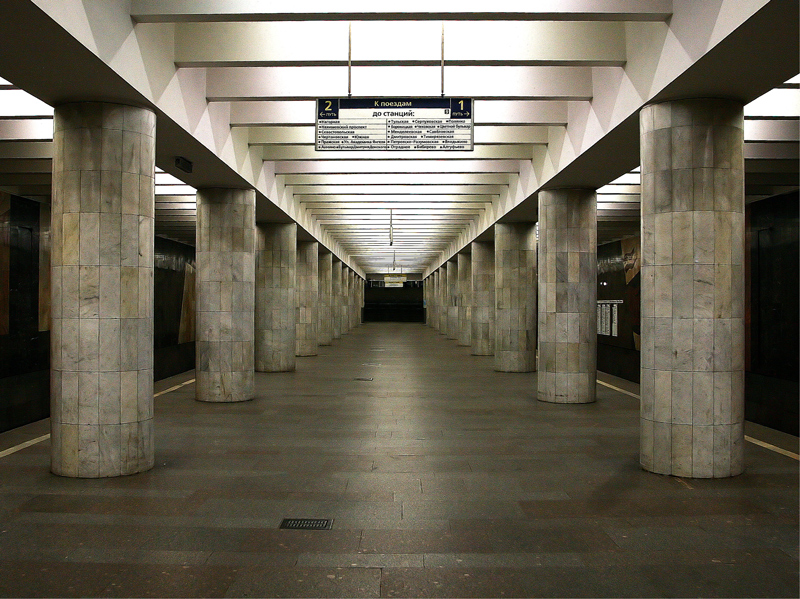

General information
- Location: Nagorny District; Nagatino-Sadovniki District; Southern Administrative Okrug; Moscow; Russia
- Coordinates: 55.6830°N 37.6224°E
- System: Moscow Metro station
- Owner: Moskovsky Metropoliten
- Line: Serpukhovsko-Timiryazevskaya line
- Platforms: 1
- Tracks: 2

Construction
- Depth: 13.5 metres (44 ft)
- Platform levels: 1
- Parking: No

Other information
- Station code: 144

History
- Opened: 8 November 1983; 42 years ago

Services
Preceding station	Moscow Metro	Following station
Tulskaya towards Altufyevo	Serpukhovsko-Timiryazevskaya line	Nagornaya towards Bulvar Dmitriya Donskogo
Out-of-station interchange
ZIL anticlockwise / outer	Moscow Central Circle transfer at Verkhniye Kotly	Krymskaya clockwise / inner
Route map
Location
- Location within Moscow Metro

Nagatinskaya (Russian: Нагатинская) is a station of Serpukhovsko-Timiryazevskaya line of Moscow Metro. It was opened together with several other stations of the southern part of the line on 8 November 1983. It lies underneath the surface with the depth of 13.5 metres (44 ft). The passenger dynamics for the station are 54,900 per hour on entry and 57,500 on exit.

== Design ==
There are 2 rows with 26 columns each. The distance between columns is 6.5 metres (21 ft). The walls are faced with marble of very rich palette where red and black are dominant. Also in these colors there are thematic pietre dure Ancient history of Moscow panels made by E. Zharenova and V. Vasiltsov. These compositions are devoted to the history of construction of Temples and to the start of construction of the Kremlin. An Unusual feature for the Metro is the white columns are made of soft and easy in production koelga marble.

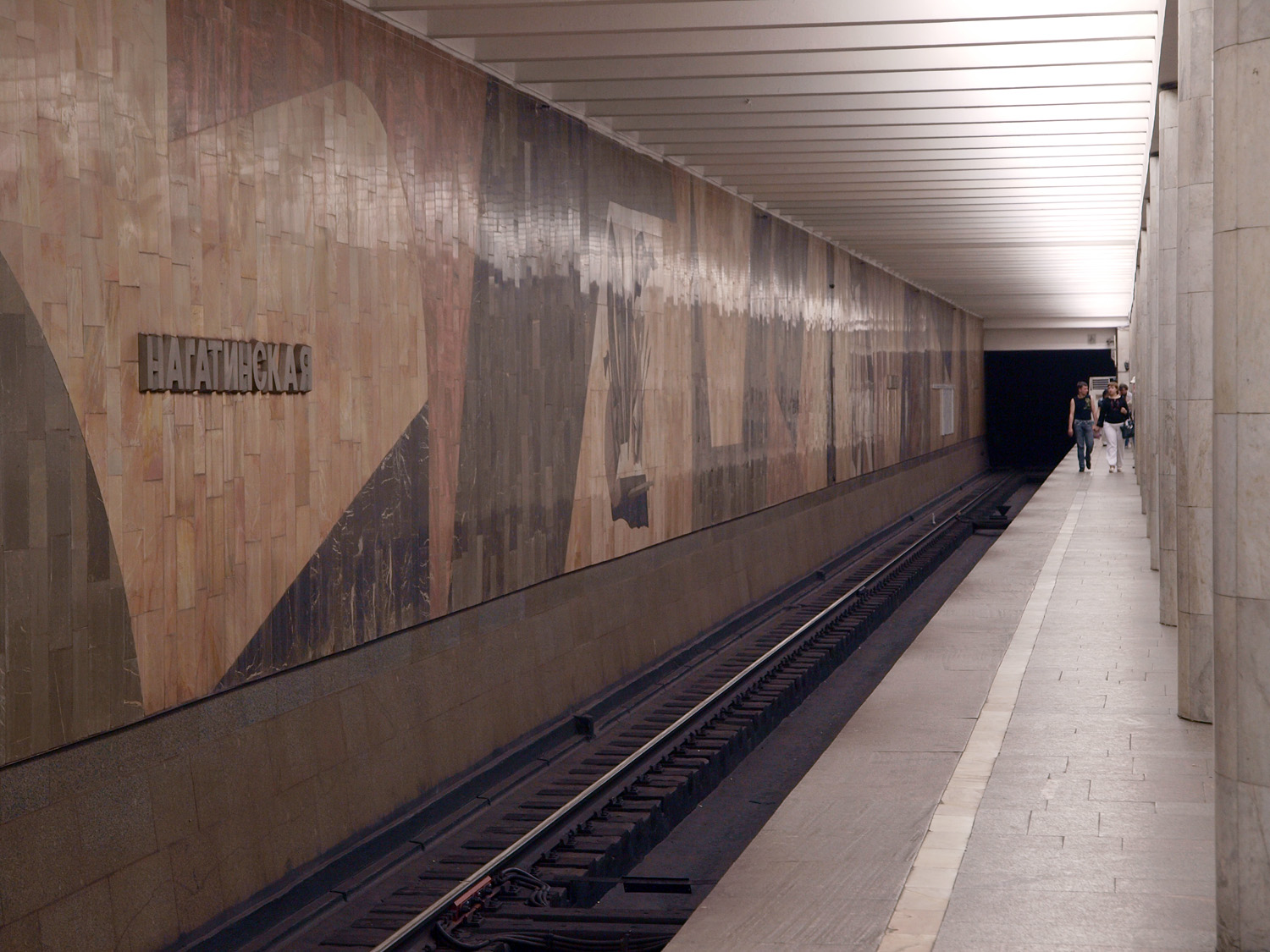
Station platform

== Exits ==
The exit is to the subway located under the Varshavskoye Highway. Nagatinskaya railway station of the Paveletsky suburban railway line is located nearby.
