= Kornilovskaya (Moscow Metro) =

Moscow Metro station

Kornilovskaya Корниловская
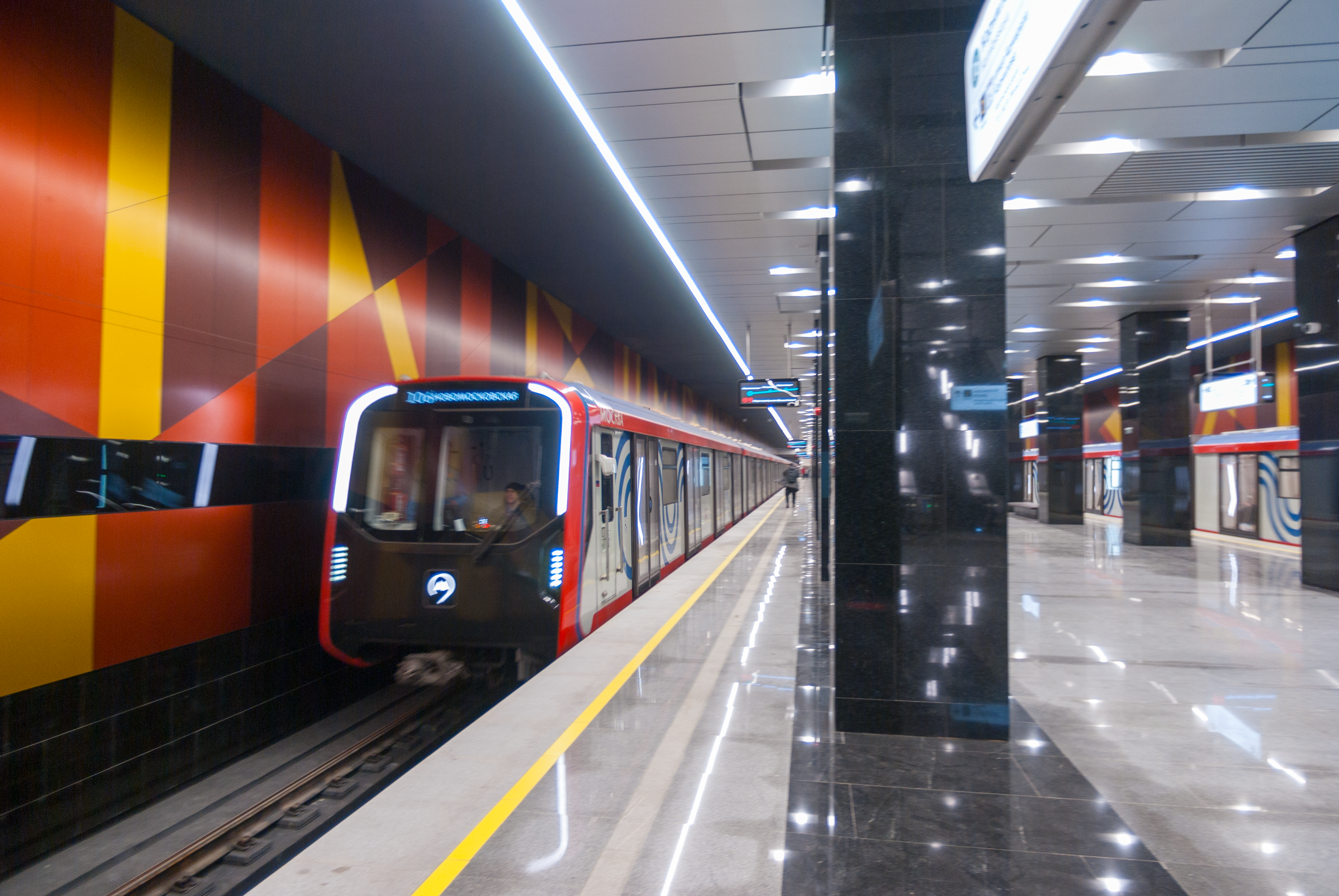
- Train on station

General information
- Location: Moscow; Russia
- Coordinates: 55.5984°N 37.4790°E
- System: Moscow Metro station
- Owner: Moskovsky Metropoliten
- Line: Troitskaya line

History
- Opened: 28 December 2024
- Former names: Mamyri

Services
Preceding station	Moscow Metro	Following station
Kommunarka towards Novomoskovskaya	Troitskaya line	Tyutchevskaya towards Novatorskaya
Route map
Location
- Location within Moscow Metro

Kornilovskaya (Russian: Корниловская) is a station on the Troitskaya line of the Moscow Metro which was opened on 28 December 2024 as a part of the extension from Tyutchevskaya to Novomoskovskaya. It is located between Tyutchevskaya and Kommunarka.

Before October 2021 it was known as Mamyri (Russian: Мамыри), after the village previously located here. The new name was given after Admiral Kornilov Street nearby.

== Gallery ==
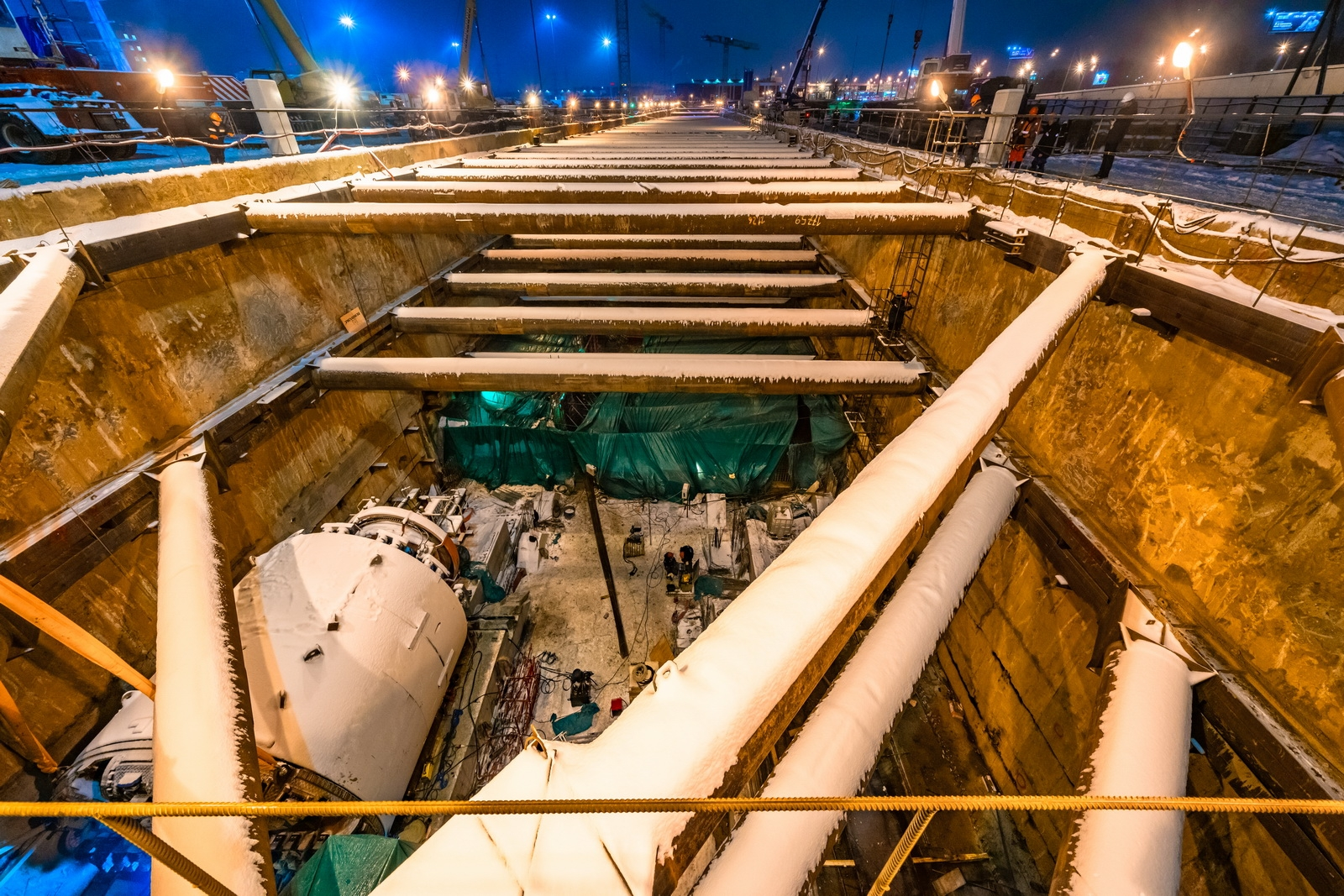
December 2020

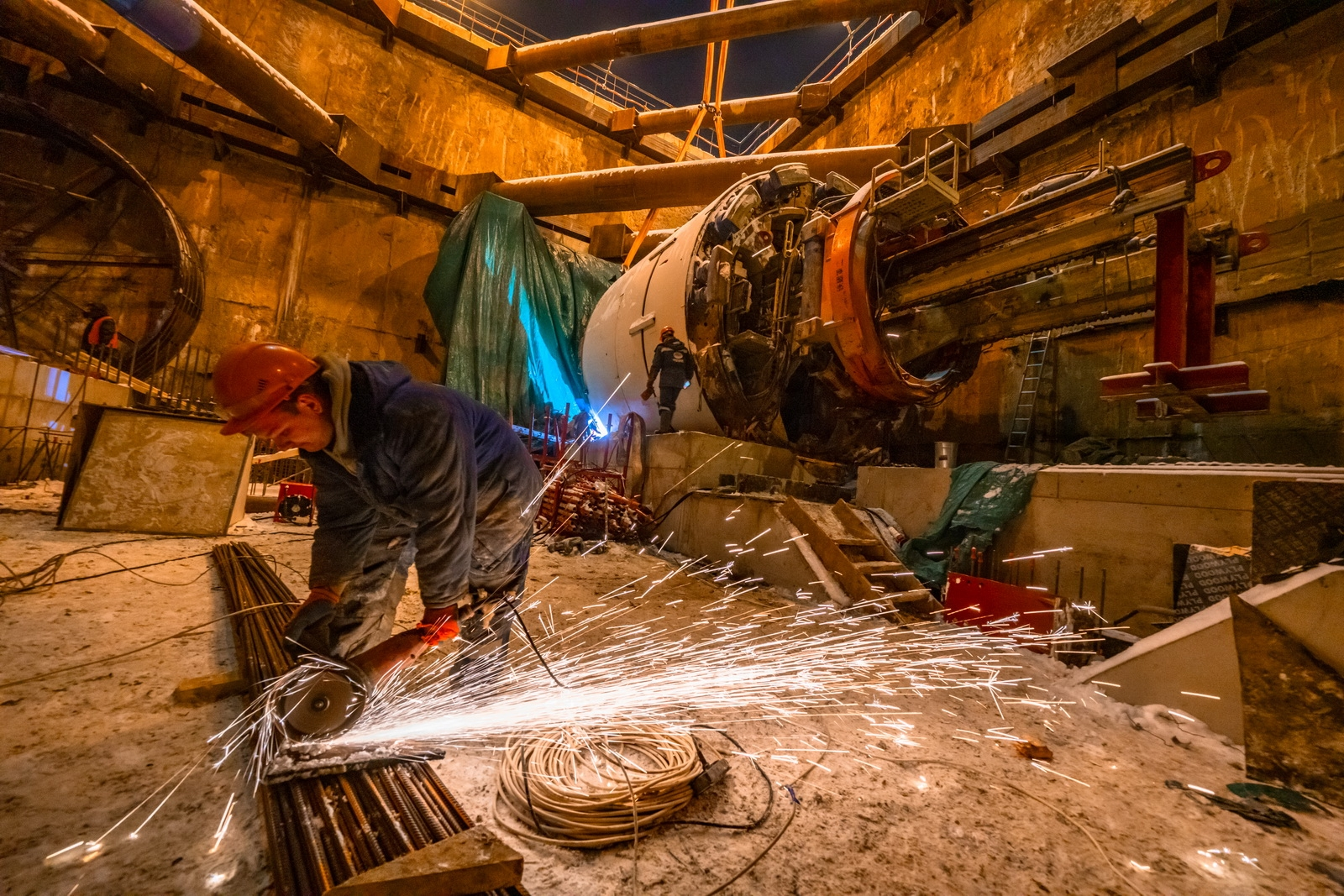

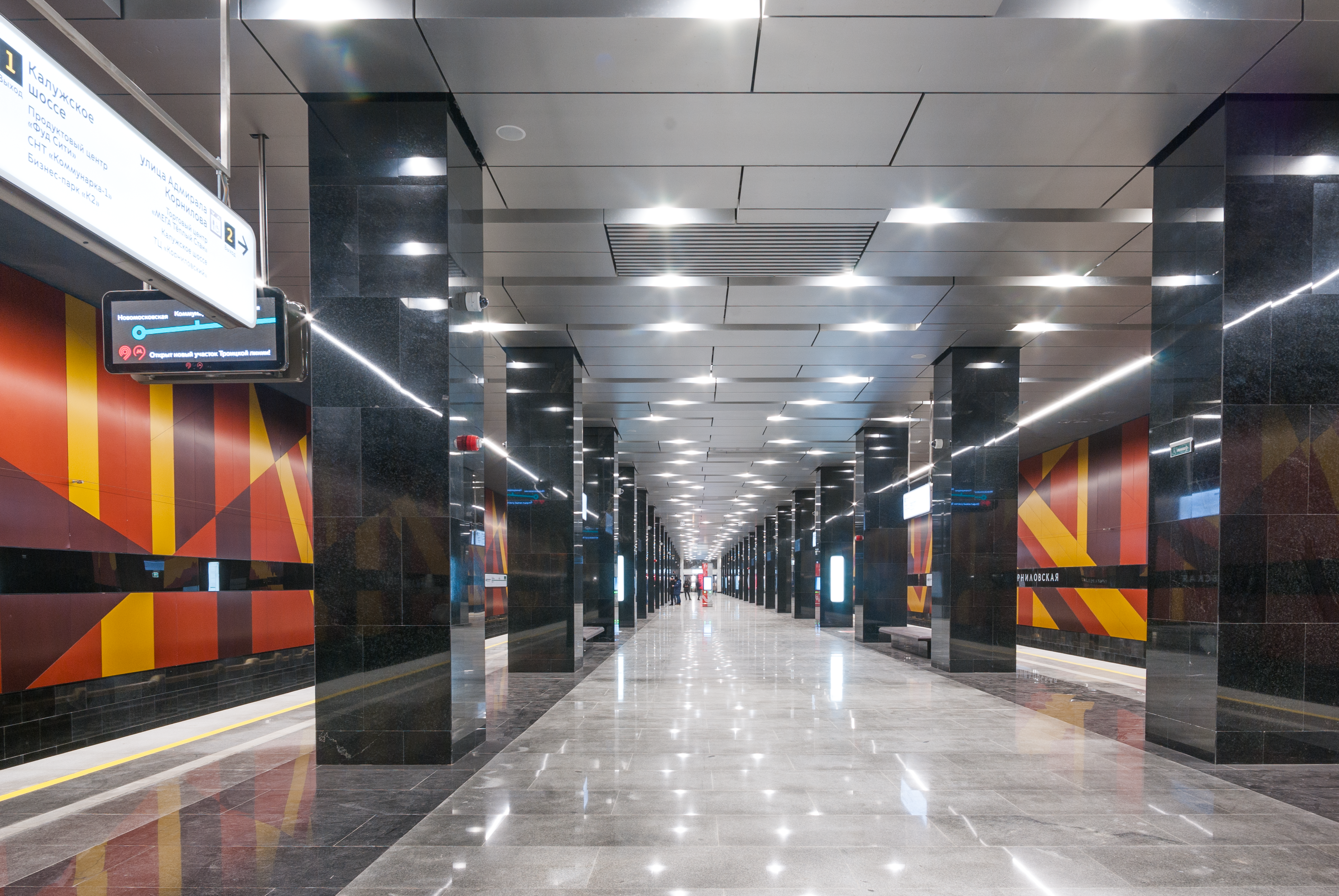
Station main hall

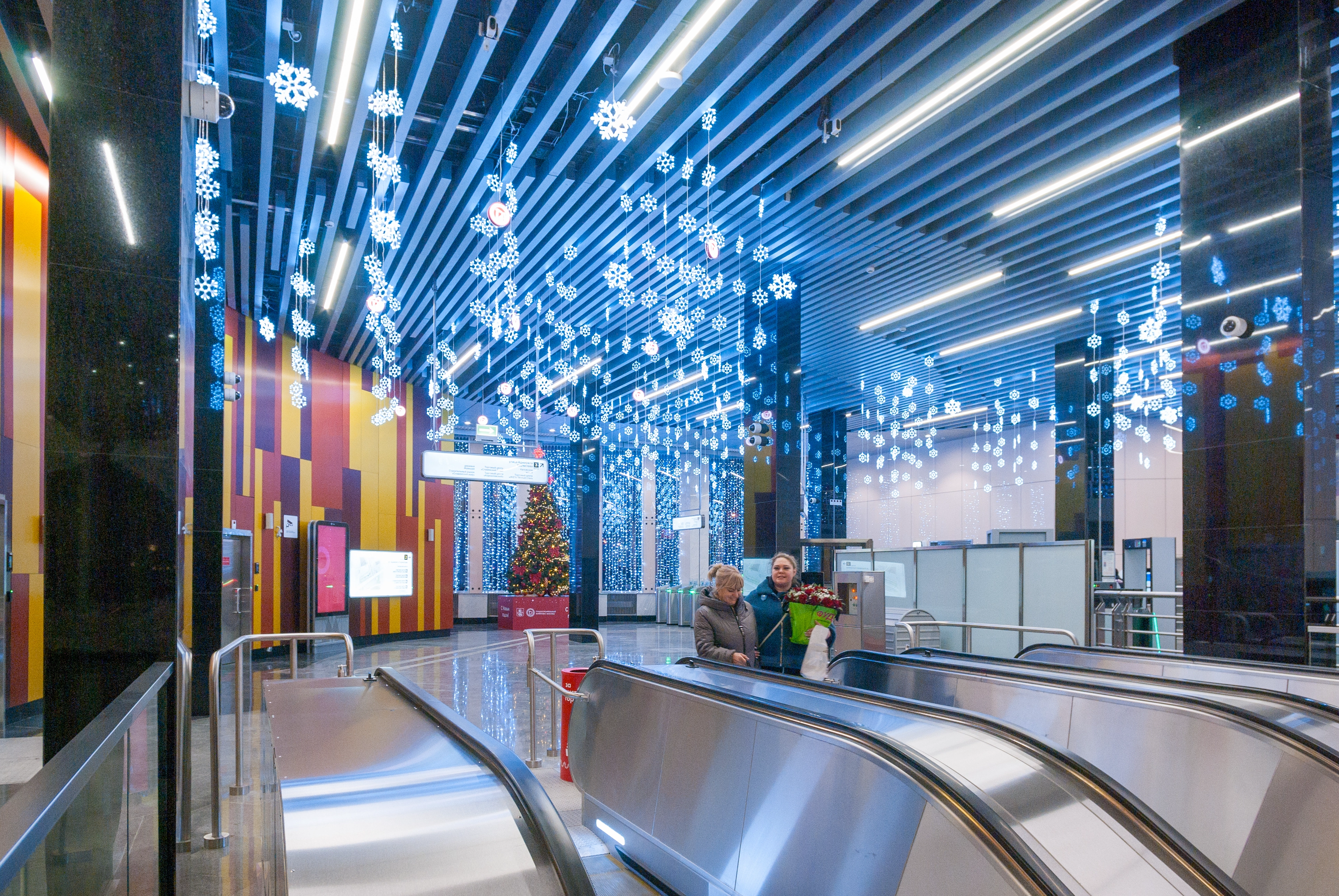
Entrance hall interior
