= Universitet Druzhby Narodov (Moscow Metro) =

Moscow Metro station

Universitet Druzhby Narodov Университет Дружбы Народов
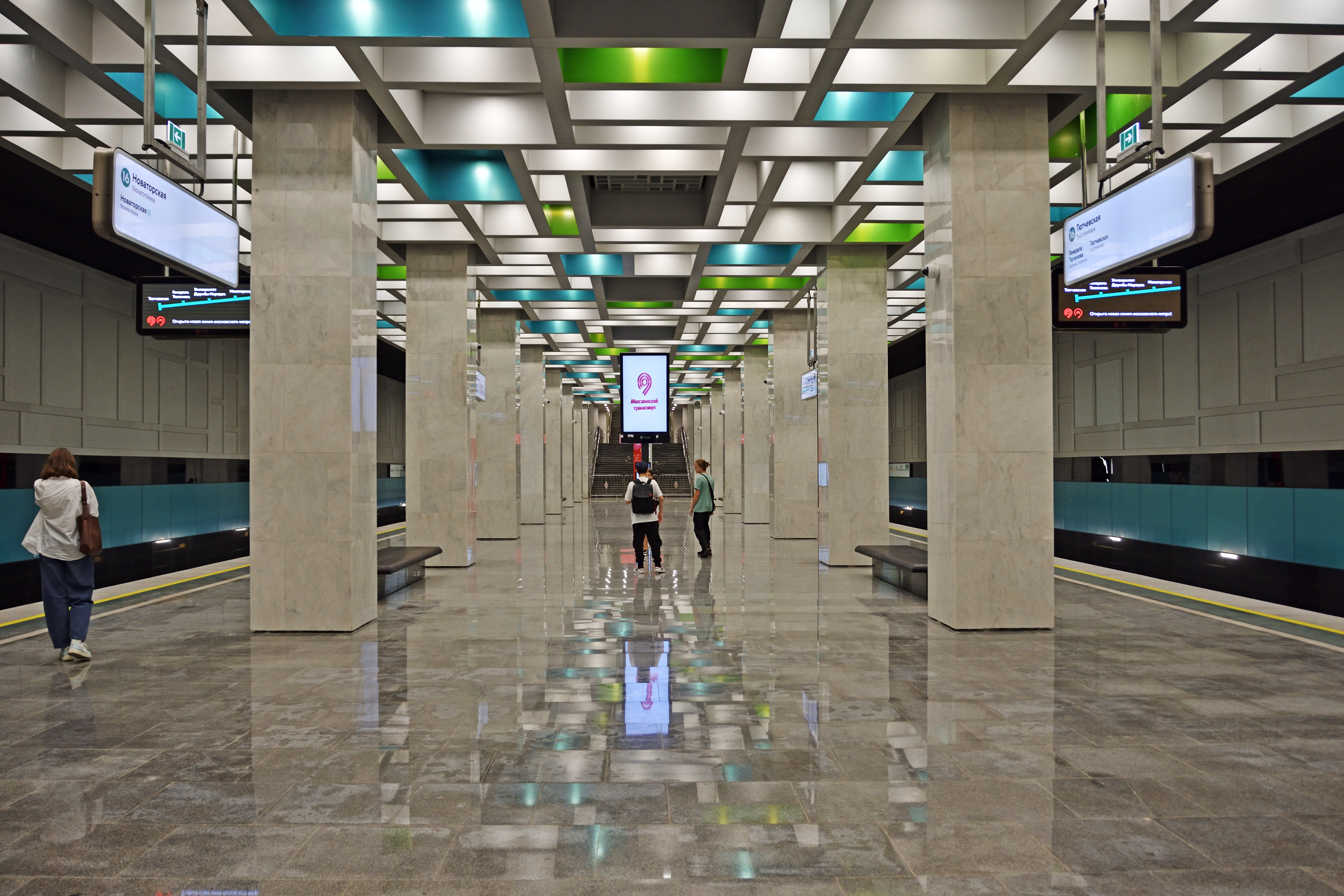

General information
- Location: Obruchevsky District, SWAO; Moscow; Russia
- Coordinates: 55.64871°N 37.50813°E
- System: Moscow Metro station
- Owner: Moskovsky Metropoliten
- Line: Troitskaya line

History
- Opened: 7 September 2024

Services
Preceding station	Moscow Metro	Following station
Generala Tyuleneva towards Novomoskovskaya	Troitskaya line	Novatorskaya Terminus
Route map
Location
- Location within Moscow Metro

Universitet Druzhby Narodov (Russian: Университет Дружбы Народов) is a Moscow Metro station located on Troitskaya line. It was opened on 7 September 2024 as part of the inaugural segment of the line, between Novatorskaya and Tyutchevskaya.

Universitet Druzhby Narodov is located between Novatorskaya and Generala Tyuleneva.

The station is built at the intersection of Miklukho-Maklaya Street and Akademika Oparina Street, close to the Patrice Lumumba Peoples' Friendship University of Russia, hence the name.

== Gallery ==
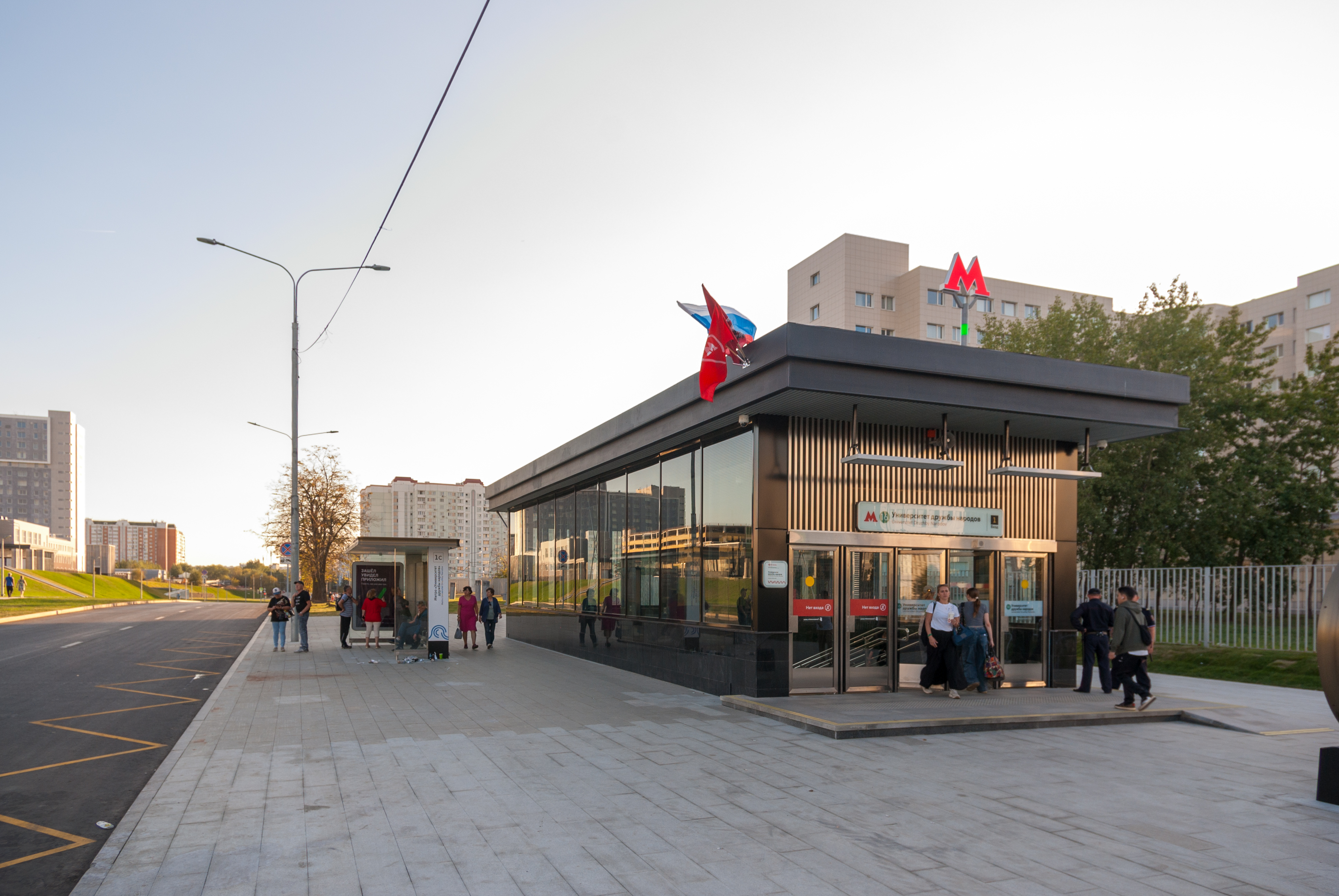

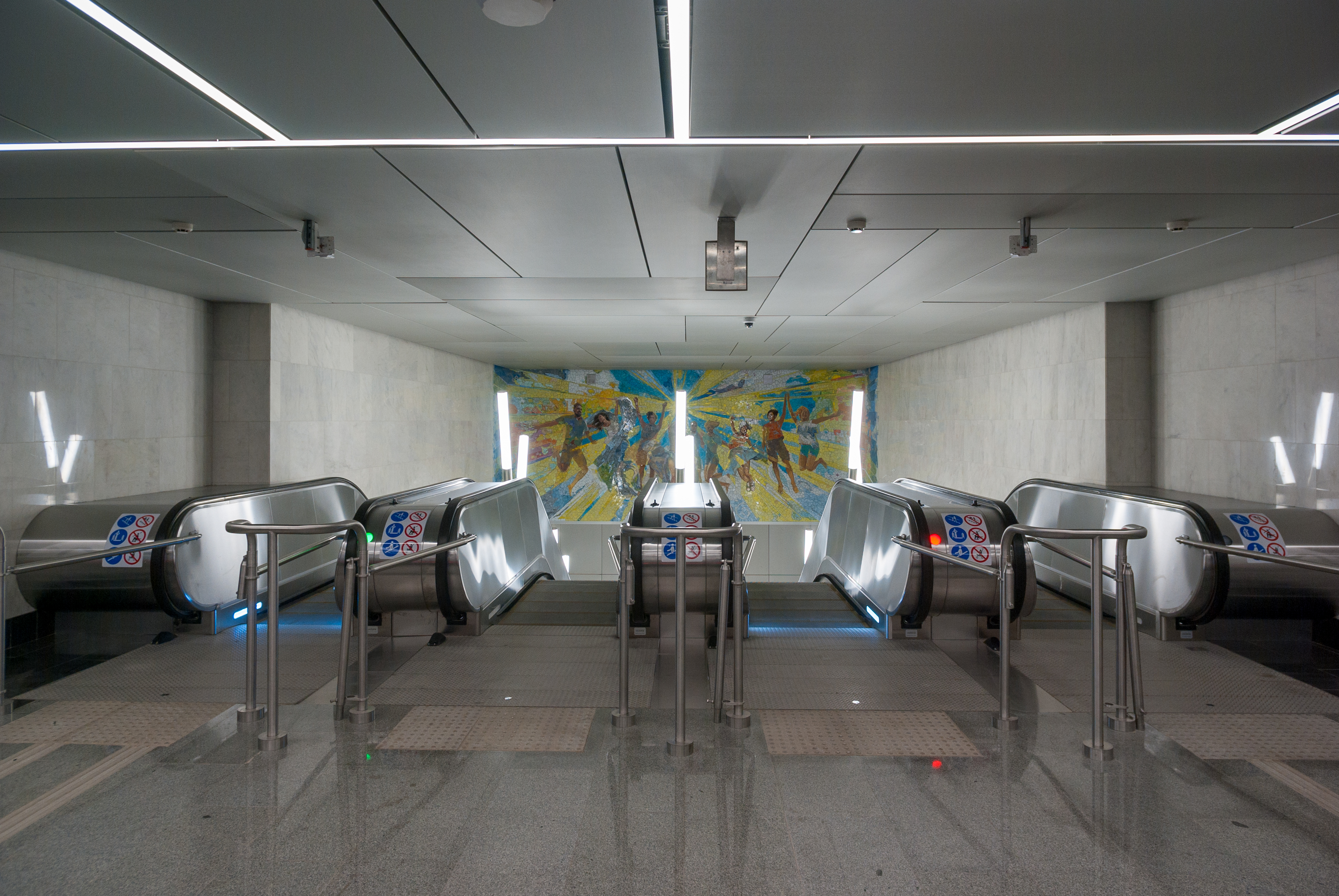

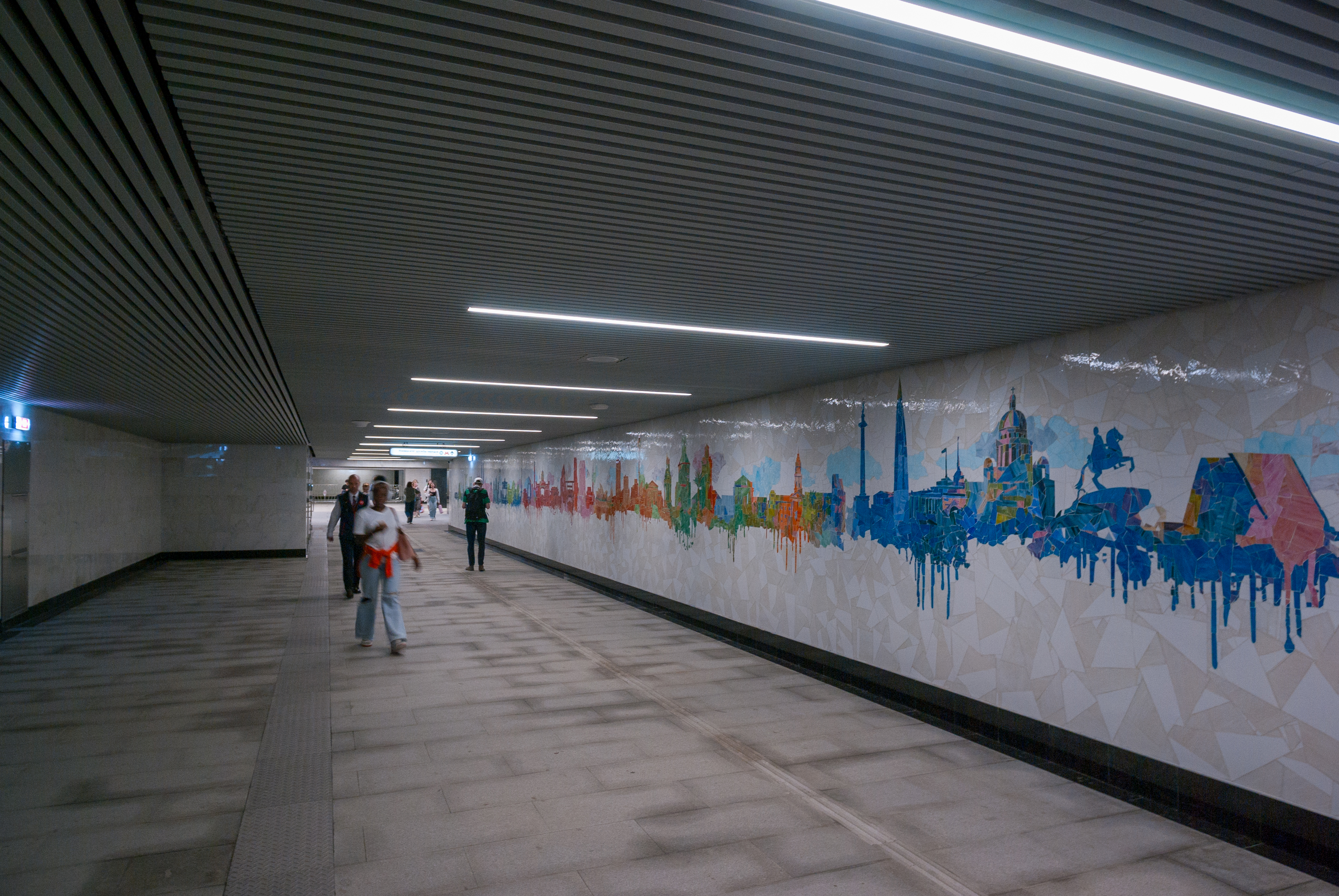
