= Vavilovskaya (Moscow Metro) =

Moscow Metro station

Vavilovskaya Вавиловская
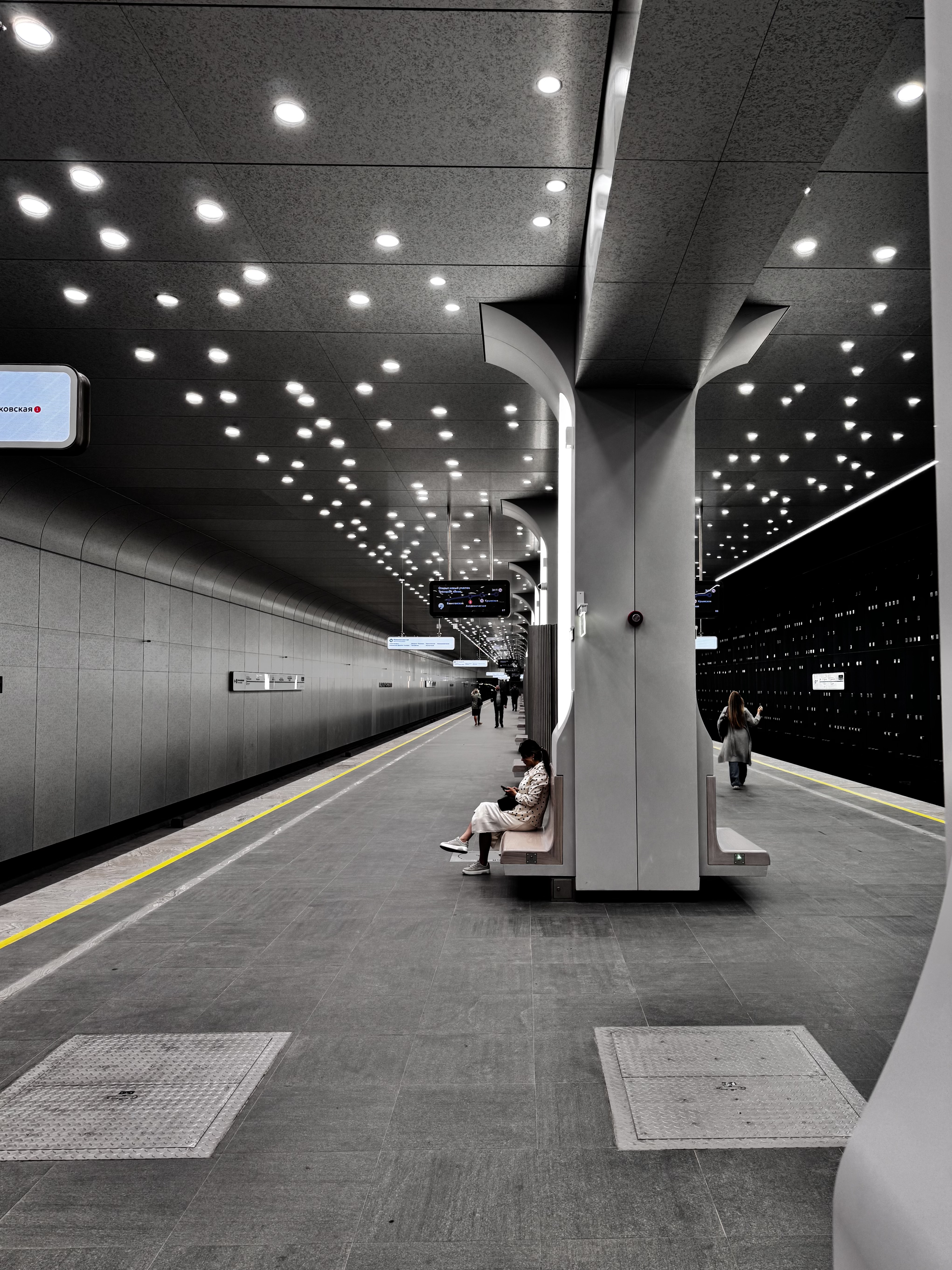

General information
- Location: Gagarinsky District, SWAO; Moscow; Russia
- Coordinates: 55.686688°N 37.543706°E
- System: Moscow Metro station
- Owner: Moskovsky Metropoliten
- Line: Troitskaya line

History
- Opened: 13 September 2025

Services
| Preceding station | Moscow Metro | Following station |
|---|---|---|
| Novatorskaya towards Novomoskovskaya | Troitskaya line | Akademicheskaya towards Novatorskaya |
Route map
Location
- Location within Moscow Metro

Vavilovskaya (Russian: Вавиловская) is a Moscow Metro station on the Troitskaya line. It is opened on 13 September 2025 as part of the northern extension of the line, between Novatorskaya and ZIL. It is located between Novatorskaya and Akademicheskaya.

The station is located at the intersection of Leninsky Avenue and Lomonosovsky Avenue.
