= ZIL (Troitskaya line) =

Moscow Metro station

ZIL ЗИЛ
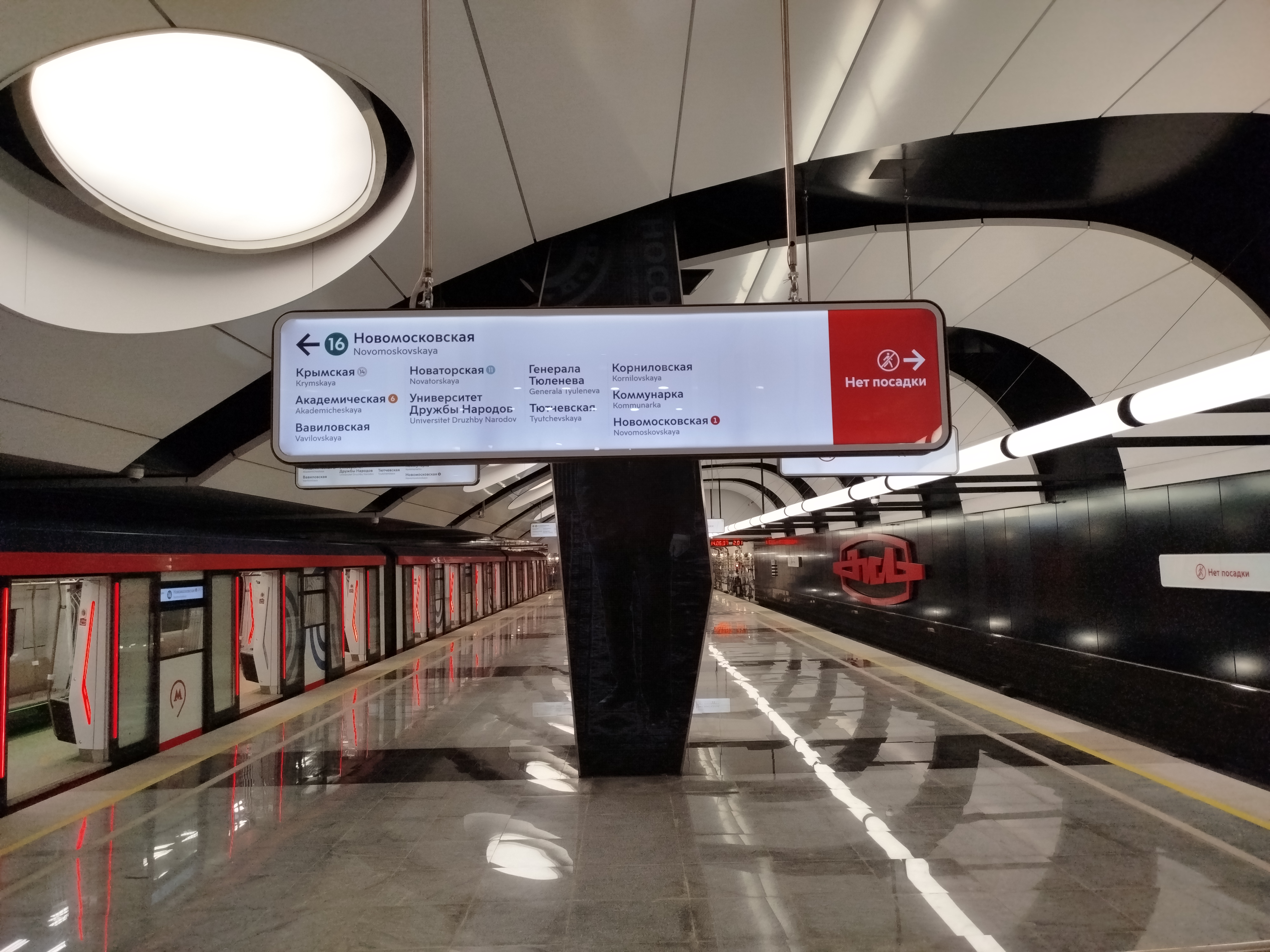

General information
- Location: Danilovsky District, SAO; Moscow; Russia
- Coordinates: 55.699332°N 37.649621°E
- System: Moscow Metro station
- Owner: Moskovsky Metropoliten
- Line: Troitskaya line

History
- Opened: 13 September 2025

Services
Preceding station	Moscow Metro	Following station
Krymskaya towards Novomoskovskaya	Troitskaya line	Terminus

Out-of-station interchange
Preceding station	Moscow Metro	Following station
Avtozavodskaya anticlockwise / outer	Moscow Central Circle transfer at ZIL	Verkhniye Kotly clockwise / inner
Route map
Location
- Location within Moscow Metro

ZIL (Russian: ЗИЛ) is a Moscow Metro station on Troitskaya line. It opened on 13 September 2025 as part of the northern extension of the line, between Novatorskaya and ZIL. It is the northern terminus of the line; the adjacent station will be Krymskaya. There is a transfer to the eponymous station of the Moscow Central Circle.

The station is located next to Likhachyov Avenue, in the area which formerly belonged to the Likhachyov Car Factory (ZiL). The factory was demolished and the land redeveloped for the construction of apartment buildings.

== Construction ==
Construction of the station began in 2021 as part of a large-scale redevelopment project of the ZiL industrial zone. Tunneling of the right running tunnel towards Krymskaya station began in August 2022, while the left tunnel was started in September 2022. Reversal sidings were built for train turnarounds.

The project provides one ground-level vestibule with exits to Lisitskogo Street and Likhachyov Avenue, near the park «Tyufeleva roshcha». Interior finishing works were fully completed by November 2024.

On 21 March 2024, Moscow mayor Sergey Sobyanin approved the official name of the station as "ZIL".

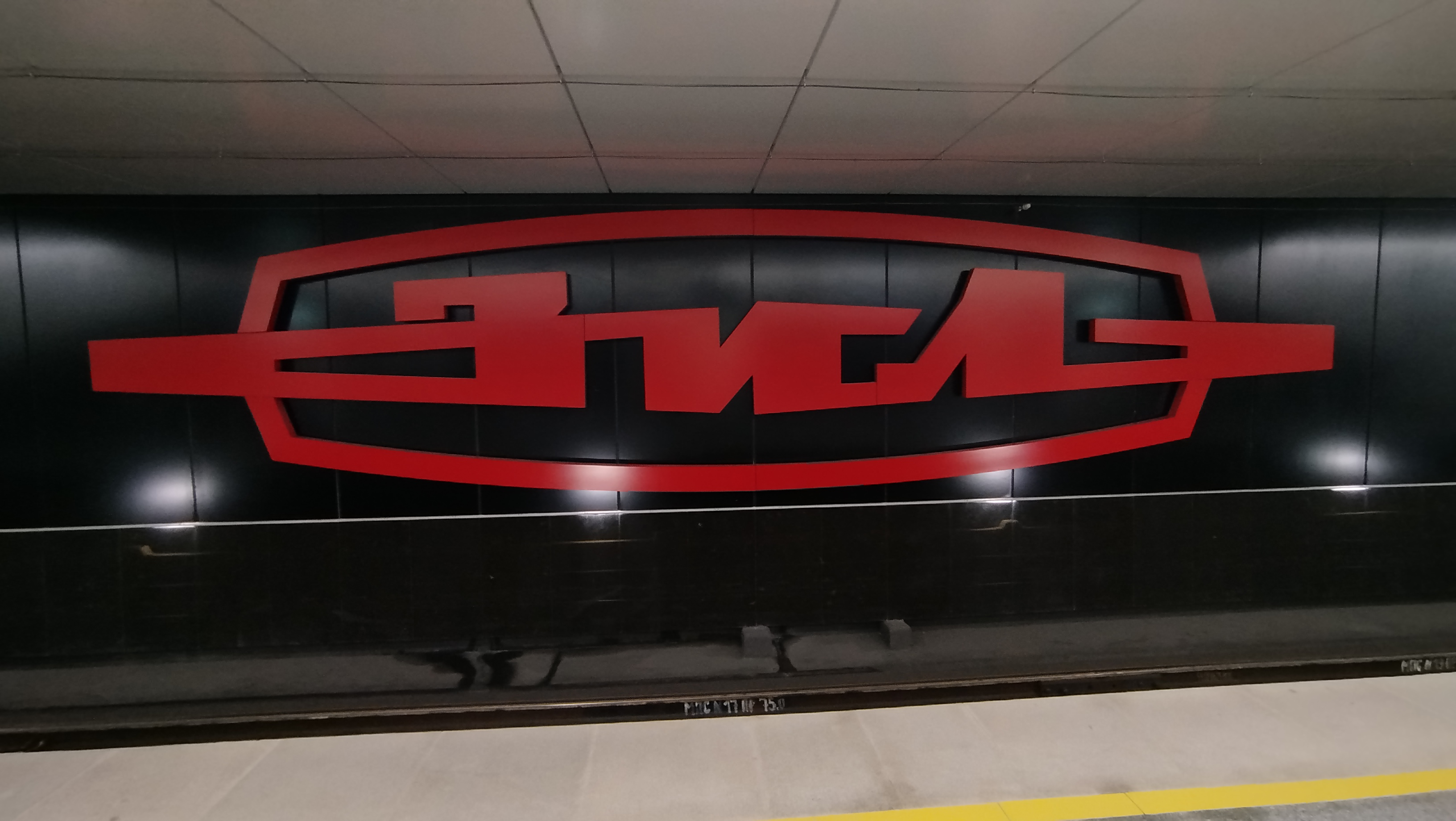
The ZiL emblem incorporated into the station wall
