= Biryulyovskaya line =

Metro line in Moscow

Overview
- Native name: Бирюлёвская линия
- Locale: Moscow
- Stations: 10 (first stage)

Service
- Type: Rapid transit
- System: Moscow Metro
- Operator: Moskovsky Metropoliten

Technical
- Line length: 22.2 kilometres (13.8 mi) (first stage)
- Character: Underground
- Track gauge: 1,520 mm (4 ft 11 27/32 in)
- Electrification: Third rail

Biryulyovskaya line (Russian: Бирюлёвская линия) (Line 18, Ruby line) is a line of the Moscow Metro under construction since 2021 which is scheduled to open in 2028+. In the future, it will be connected with Rublyovo-Arkhangelskaya line.

== Stations ==
Station Name		Transfer
English	Russian	Transfer
ZIL	ЗИЛ	ZIL ZIL
Ostrov Mechty	Остров мечты	Tekhnopark
Klenovy Bulvar	Кленовый бульвар	Klenovy Bulvar
Kuryanovo	Курьяново	
Moskvorechye	Москворечье	
Luganskaya	Луганская	
Kaspiyskaya	Каспийская	
Lipetskaya	Липецкая	
Lebedyanskaya	Лебедянская	
Biryulyovo	Бирюлёво	МЦД-5 Biryulyovo-Passazhirskaya
