= Tulskaya (Moscow Metro) =

Moscow Metro station

Tulskaya Tульская
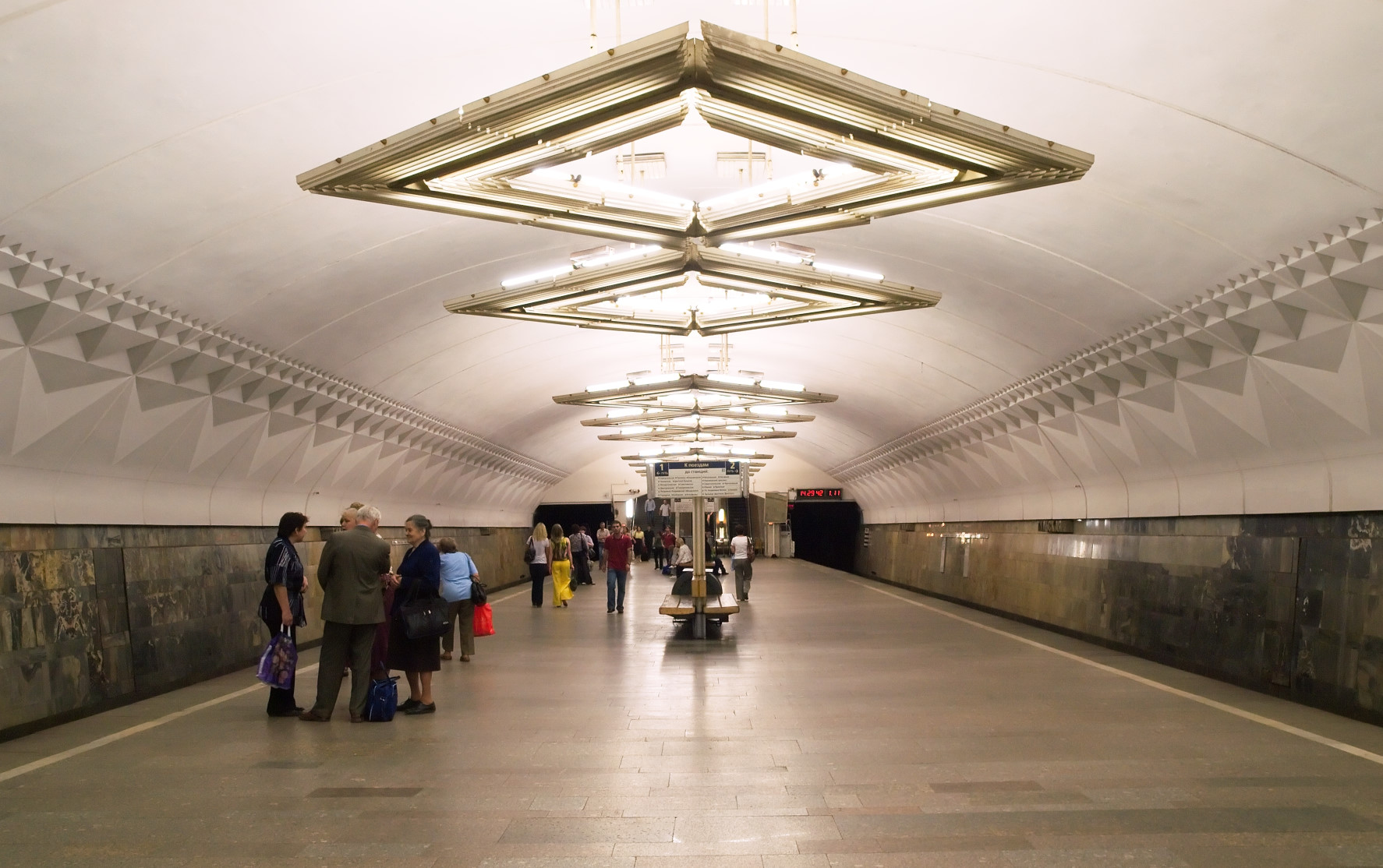

General information
- Location: Danilovsky District; Southern Administrative Okrug; Moscow; Russia
- Coordinates: 55.7087°N 37.6229°E
- System: Moscow Metro station
- Owner: Moskovsky Metropoliten
- Line: Serpukhovsko-Timiryazevskaya line
- Platforms: 1 island platform
- Tracks: 2

Construction
- Structure type: shallow level single-vault station
- Depth: 9.5 metres (31 ft)
- Platform levels: 1
- Parking: No

Other information
- Station code: 143

History
- Opened: 8 November 1983; 42 years ago

Services
Preceding station	Moscow Metro	Following station
Serpukhovskaya towards Altufyevo	Serpukhovsko-Timiryazevskaya line	Nagatinskaya towards Bulvar Dmitriya Donskogo
Route map
Location
- Location within Moscow Metro

Tulskaya (Russian: Tульская) is a station of the Serpukhovsko-Timiryazevskaya Line of the Moscow Metro. It was opened in 1983 as part of the pilot stage of the line. The station is a single vault located underneath the Tulskaya square, named after the city of Tula.

There are future plans to construct a transfer station with the same name to the Rublyovo-Arkhangelskaya and Biryulyovskaya lines when they fusion together.
