= Verkhniye Kotly =

Station on the Moscow Central Circle

Verkhniye Kotly Верхние Котлы
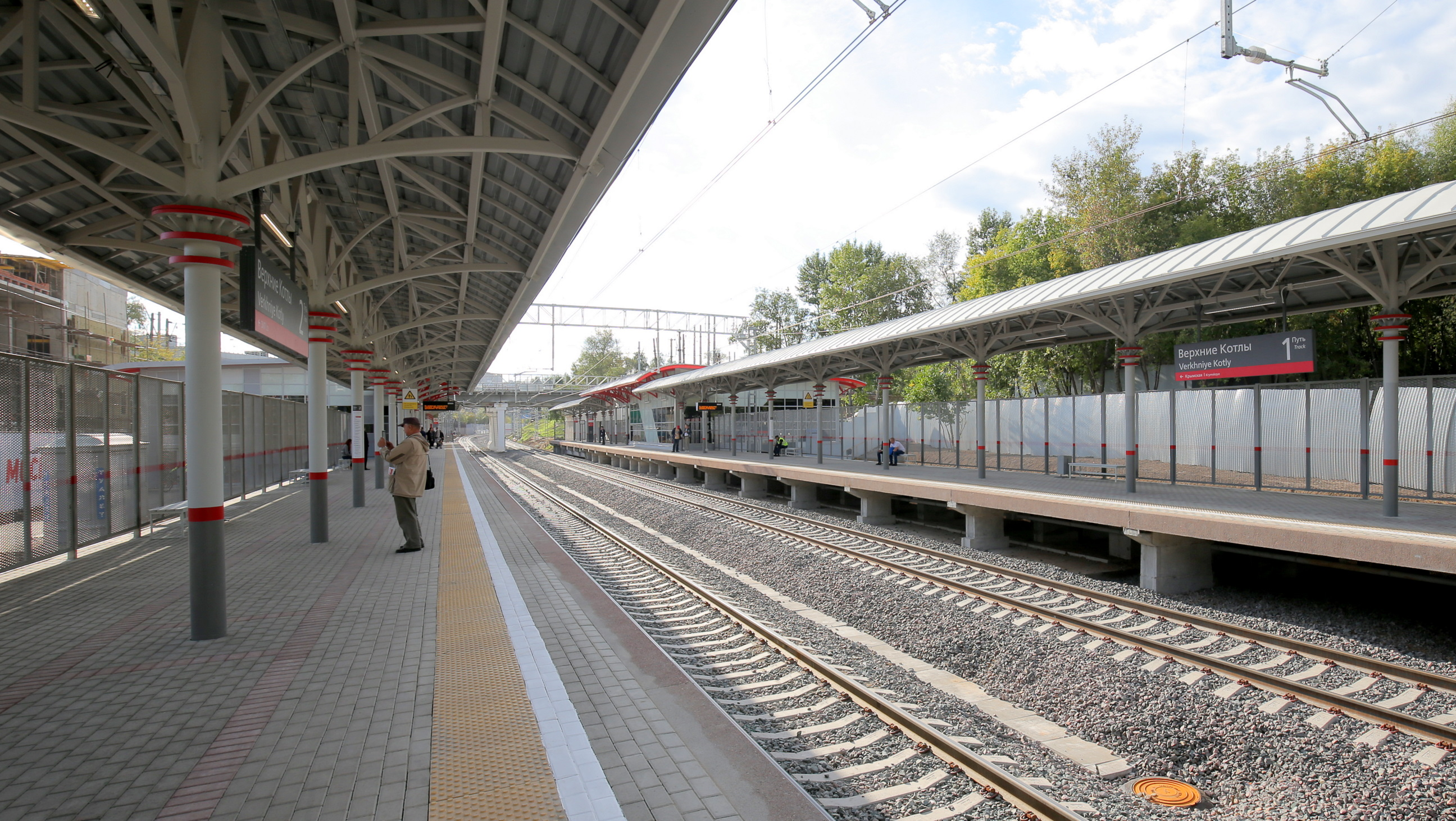

General information
- Location: Nagornyy Proyezd, 2А, Moscow; Russia
- Coordinates: 55.6902°N 37.6193°E
- System: Moscow Metro station
- Owner: Government of Moscow (MKZD)
- Operator: Russian Railways (within Moscow Metro)
- Line: Moscow Central Circle
- Platforms: 2 side platforms
- Tracks: 2
- Train operators: Russian Railways
- Connections: Moscow Railway Platform: Verkhnie Kotly railway station

Construction
- Structure type: At-grade

History
- Opened: 10 September 2016; 9 years ago

Services
Preceding station	Moscow Metro	Following station
ZIL anticlockwise / outer	Moscow Central Circle	Krymskaya clockwise / inner
Out-of-station interchange
Preceding station	Moscow Metro	Following station
Tulskaya towards Altufyevo	Serpukhovsko-Timiryazevskaya line transfer at Nagatinskaya	Nagornaya towards Bulvar Dmitriya Donskogo
Location
- Location within Moscow Metro

Verkhniye Kotly (Russian: Верхние Котлы) is a station on the Moscow Central Circle of the Moscow Metro that opened in September 2016.

== Name ==
The station is named for the former village of Verkhniye Kotly, which was annexed to Moscow in 1932. The name of the station was changed from the originally planned Varshavskoye Shosse in August 2016.
