= Kornilovskaya, Arkhangelsk Oblast =

Kornilovskaya Корниловская
- Village
- Location within Arkhangelsk Oblast Location within Russia
- Coordinates: 62°05′N 45°13′E
- Country: Russia
- Region: Arkhangelsk Oblast
- District: Verkhnetoyemsky District
- Time zone: UTC+3:00

Kornilovskaya (Russian: Корниловская) is a rural locality (a village) in Dvinskoye Rural Settlement of Verkhnetoyemsky District, Arkhangelsk Oblast, Russia. The population was 16 as of 2010.

== Geography ==
Kornilovskaya is located on the Sodonga River, 24 km southeast of Verkhnyaya Toyma (the district's administrative centre) by road. Isakovskaya is the nearest rural locality.
