= Akademichesky District =

Akademichesky District Академический район (Russian)
- District
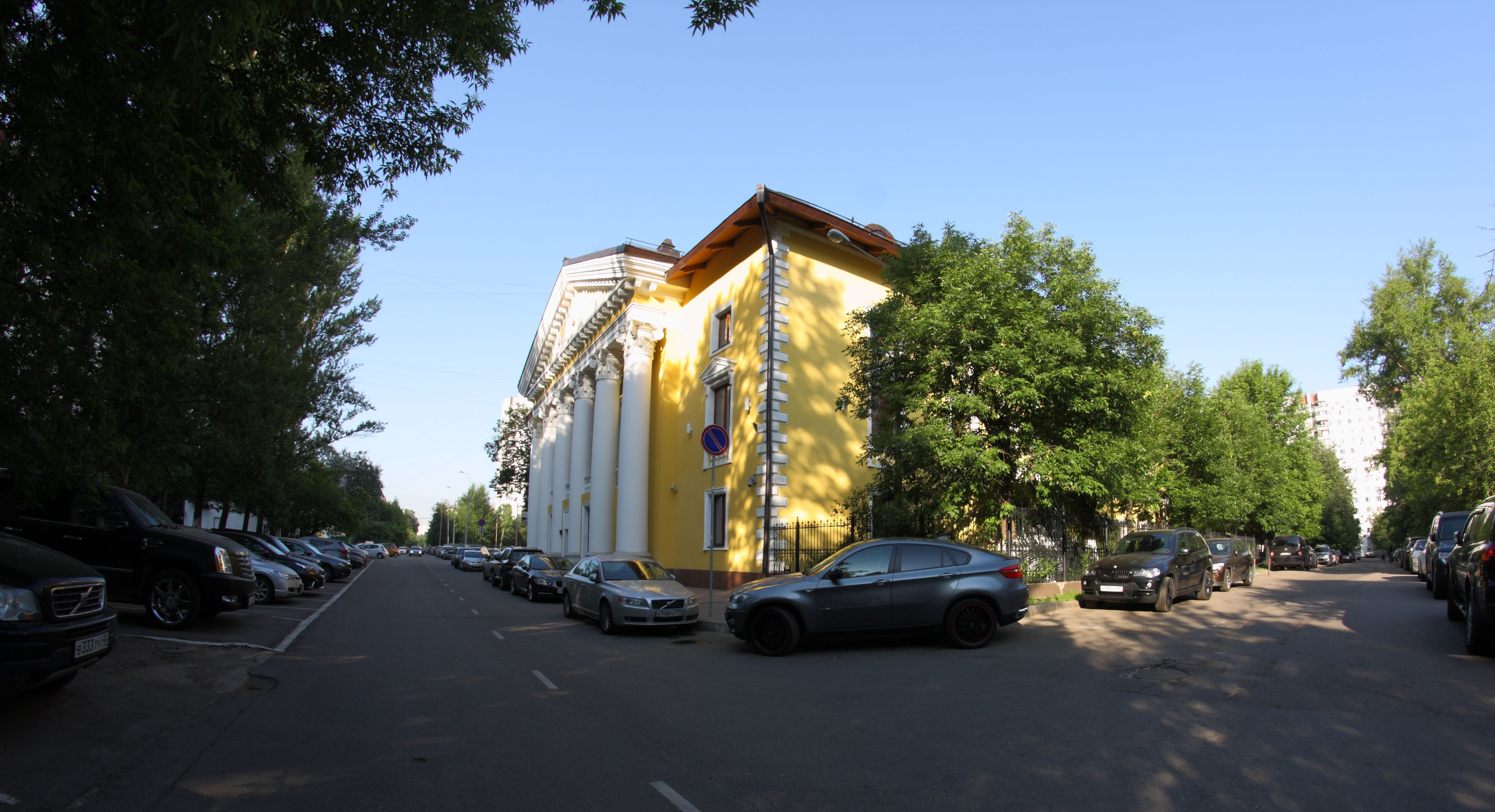
- Former House of Culture "Novator", Akademichesky District

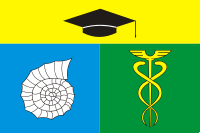
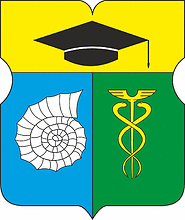
- Flag Coat of arms
- Location of Akademichesky District on the map of Moscow
- Coordinates: 55°41′23″N 37°34′23″E
- Country: Russia
- Federal subject: Moscow

Area
  - Total: 5.57 km^{2} (2.15 sq mi)

Population
  - Estimate (2017): 109,000
- Time zone: UTC+
- OKTMO ID: 45397000
- Website: http://akademichesky.mos.ru/

Akademichesky District (Russian: Академи́ческий райо́н, literally "academic district") is an administrative district (raion) of South-Western Administrative Okrug, and one of the 125 raions of Moscow, Russia. The area of the district is 5.57 square kilometers (2.15 sq mi). Population: 109,000 (2017 est.). The district contains a number of scientific organizations and research institutions. The streets in the district are named after famous scientists and engineers. The Akademichesky metro station is on the Kaluzhsko-Rizhskaya line (No. 6), with a transfer to the planned Troitskaya line (No. 16).

== See also ==
- Administrative divisions of Moscow
