= Troitskaya line =

Moscow Metro line

Overview
- Owner: Moskovsky Metropoliten
- Locale: Moscow
- Termini: Novomoskovskaya (west); ZIL (east)
- Stations: 11 (6 opening in 2030)

Service
- Type: Rapid transit
- System: Moscow Metro
- Operator: Moskovsky Metropoliten
- Rolling stock: 81-775.2

History
- Opened: 7 September 2024; 2 years ago
- Last extension: 2025

Technical
- Line length: 23.9 km (14.9 mi)
- Character: Underground
- Track gauge: 1,520 mm (4 ft 11 27/32 in)
- Electrification: Third rail

The Troitskaya line (Russian: Троицкая ли́ния, named after its planned terminus in the town of Troitsk) (Line 16; Emerald Line), previously Kommunarskaya Line, Russian: Коммунарская ли́ния, after the suburb of Kommunarka is a line of the Moscow Metro that will initially extend to the settlement of Kommunarka in the Novomoskovsky Administrative Okrug, or New Moscow from Novatorskaya station. Future expansion plans will extend the line to the town of Troitsk. The first section of the line from Novatorskaya to Tyutchevskaya opened on 7 September 2024.

== Development ==
Following the expansion of the city of Moscow, which doubled the city’s size, the city administration sought to increase public transit into the area, known as New Moscow. In 2014, the Mayor of Moscow, Sergey Sobyanin, undertook a visit to China where he signed an agreement with the China Railway Construction Corporation (CRCC) and China International Fund to build a line to New Moscow and finance construction by developing real estate at the stations. With the fall of the ruble in late 2014, negotiations over costs were held up and the Deputy Mayor for Construction Marat Khusnullin announced that the city would continue development using its own funds.

By 2016, the city was again negotiating with CRCC for construction of the line. Rather than CRCC handling the whole project, the city wanted to split the work between Russian and Chinese workers. The parties agreed not only on construction of the Troitskaya line, but also three stations of the Bolshaya Koltsevaya line: Michurinsky Prospekt, Aminyevskaya, and Prospekt Vernadskogo.

On 19 June 2019, construction began on the Universitet Druzhby Narodov station, and on 17 July it was announced that construction work at various stages was already underway at all stations of the first section.

On 26 August 2019 Sergei Sobyanin officially announced the extension of line 16 to the south from Kommunarka to Troitsk. According to him, the southern section will be 14.6 kilometres (9.1 mi) long and will have six stations. Part of the section from Sosenki to Desna will be at-ground.

On 25 November 2019 the construction of the first tunnel of the line between "Ulitsa Novatorov" and "Universitet Druzhby Narodov" began. On 4 December 2020, tunneling was completed, the shield passed 2.7 kilometres (1.7 mi) at a depth of up to 30 metres (98 ft).

In September 2021, construction from Krimskaya to ZIL stations was confirmed. In June 2023, planning for the second major segment of the line, from Kommunarka to Kedrovaya stations, was confirmed, and in October 2023, planning was extended to Troitsk station.

On 7 September 2024, Moscow City Day, the first segment from Novatorskaya to Tyutchevskaya opened.

On 28 December 2024, the second segment from Tyutchevskaya to Novomoskovskaya opened.

On 13 September 2025, the third segment from Novatorskaya to ZIL opened.

== Future ==
The Institute of the General Plan of Moscow assumes to extend the line future from ZIL, along MCC and to Nizhegorodskaya to connect the line with Nekrasovskaya line.

== Stations ==
| Station Name | | Transfers | Status |
| English | Russian | Transfers | Status |
|---|---|---|---|
| ZIL | ЗИЛ | ZIL; ZIL | Open |
| Krymskaya | Крымская | Krymskaya | Open |
| Akademicheskaya | Академическая | Akademicheskaya | Open |
| Vavilovskaya | Вавиловская | | |
| Novatorskaya | Новаторcкая | Novatorskaya | Open |
| Universitet Druzhby Narodov | Университет Дружбы Народов | | Open |
| Generala Tyuleneva | Генерала Тюленева | | Open |
| Tyutchevskaya | Тютчевская | | Open |
| Kornilovskaya | Корниловская | | Open |
| Kommunarka | Коммунарка | | Open |
| Novomoskovskaya | Новомоско́вская | Novomoskovskaya | Open |
| Sosenki | Сосенки | | Under construction |
| Rakitki | Ракитки | | Under construction |
| Desna | Десна | | Under construction |
| Kedrovaya | Кедровая | Kedrovaya | Under construction |
| Vatutinki | Ватутинки | | Under construction |
| Troitsk | Троицк | | Under construction |
| Krasnaya Pakhra | Красная Пахра | | Planned |
| Moskino | Москино | | Planned |
