= Tyutchevskaya (Moscow Metro) =

Moscow Metro station

Tyutchevskaya Тютчевская
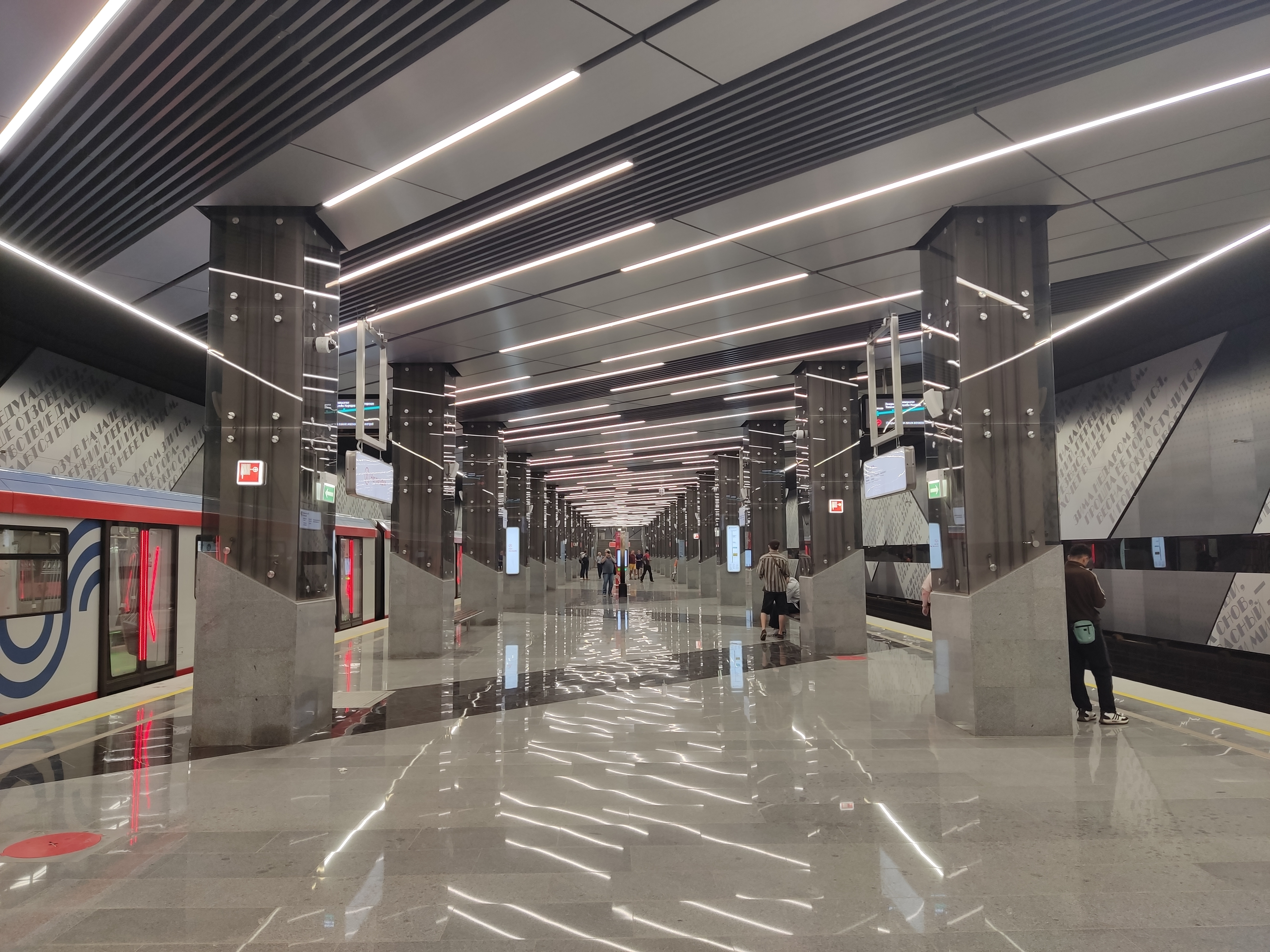

General information
- Location: Mosrentgen settlement, NAO; Moscow; Russia
- Coordinates: 55.61909°N 37.48103°E
- System: Moscow Metro station
- Owner: Moskovsky Metropoliten
- Line: Troitskaya line

History
- Opened: 7 September 2024

Services
Preceding station	Moscow Metro	Following station
Kornilovskaya towards Novomoskovskaya	Troitskaya line	Generala Tyuleneva towards Novatorskaya
Route map
Location
- Location within Moscow Metro

Tyutchevskaya (Russian: Тютчевская) is a station on the Troitskaya line of the Moscow Metro. It was opened on 7 September 2024 as part of the inaugural segment of the line, between Novatorskaya and Tyutchevskaya. The adjacent stations are Generala Tyuleneva and Kornilovskaya.

Tyutchevskaya served as the southern terminus of the line until 28 December 2024, when the southern extension of Troitskaya Line to Novomoskovskaya was opened.

== Name ==
Initial name of the station was Slavyansky Mir (Russian: Славянский мир "Slavic World") after a market located on the projected location of the construction works. On 15 November 2020, the head of Mosrentgen municipality O. A. Mitrofanov confirmed the new name for the station Tyutchevskaya. It is associated with the former Troitskoye estate which was located nearby and was owned by the well-known 19th century Russian poet Fyodor Tyutchev.

== Gallery ==
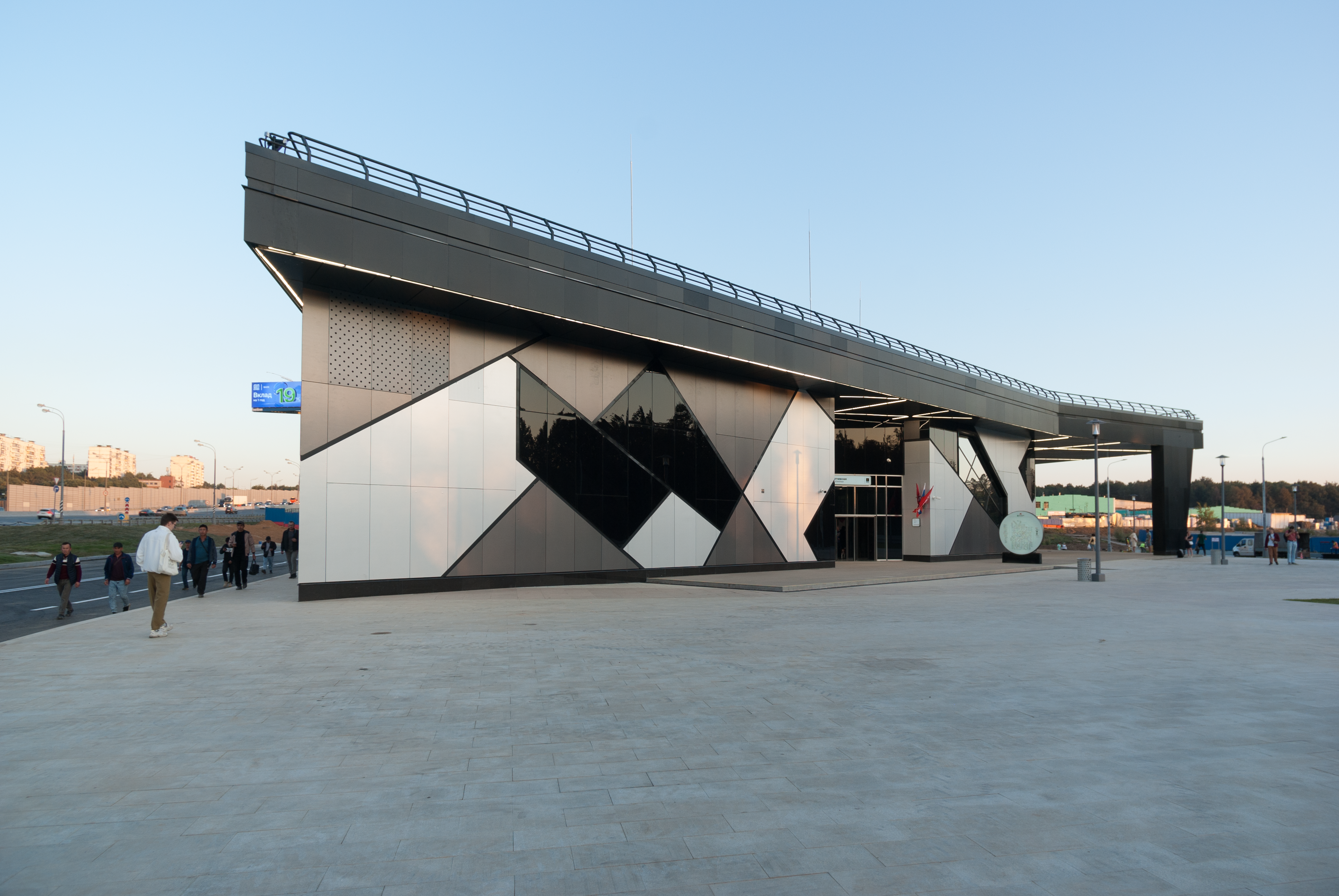

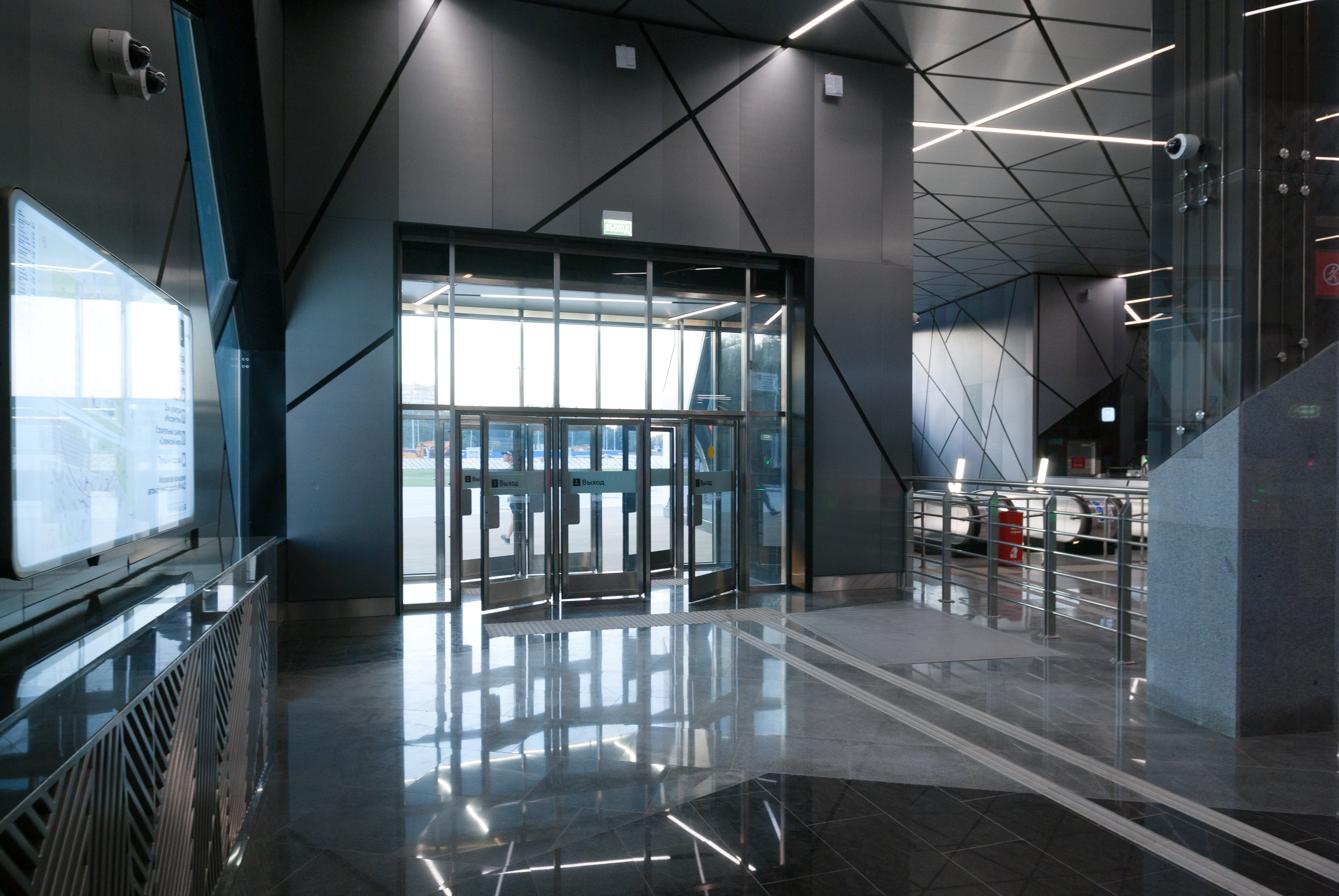

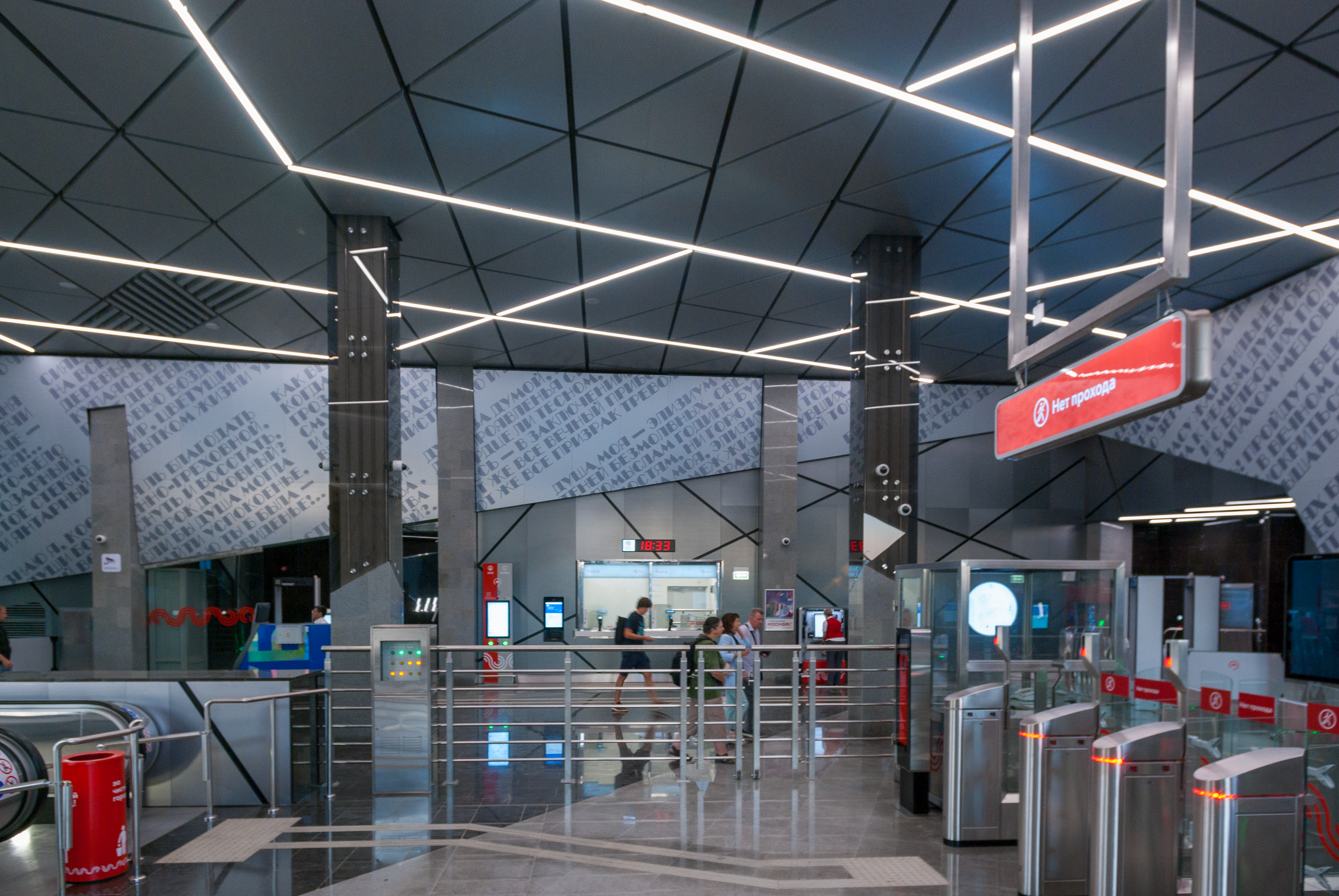
