= Novatorskaya (Troitskaya line) =

Moscow Metro station

Novatorskaya Новаторская
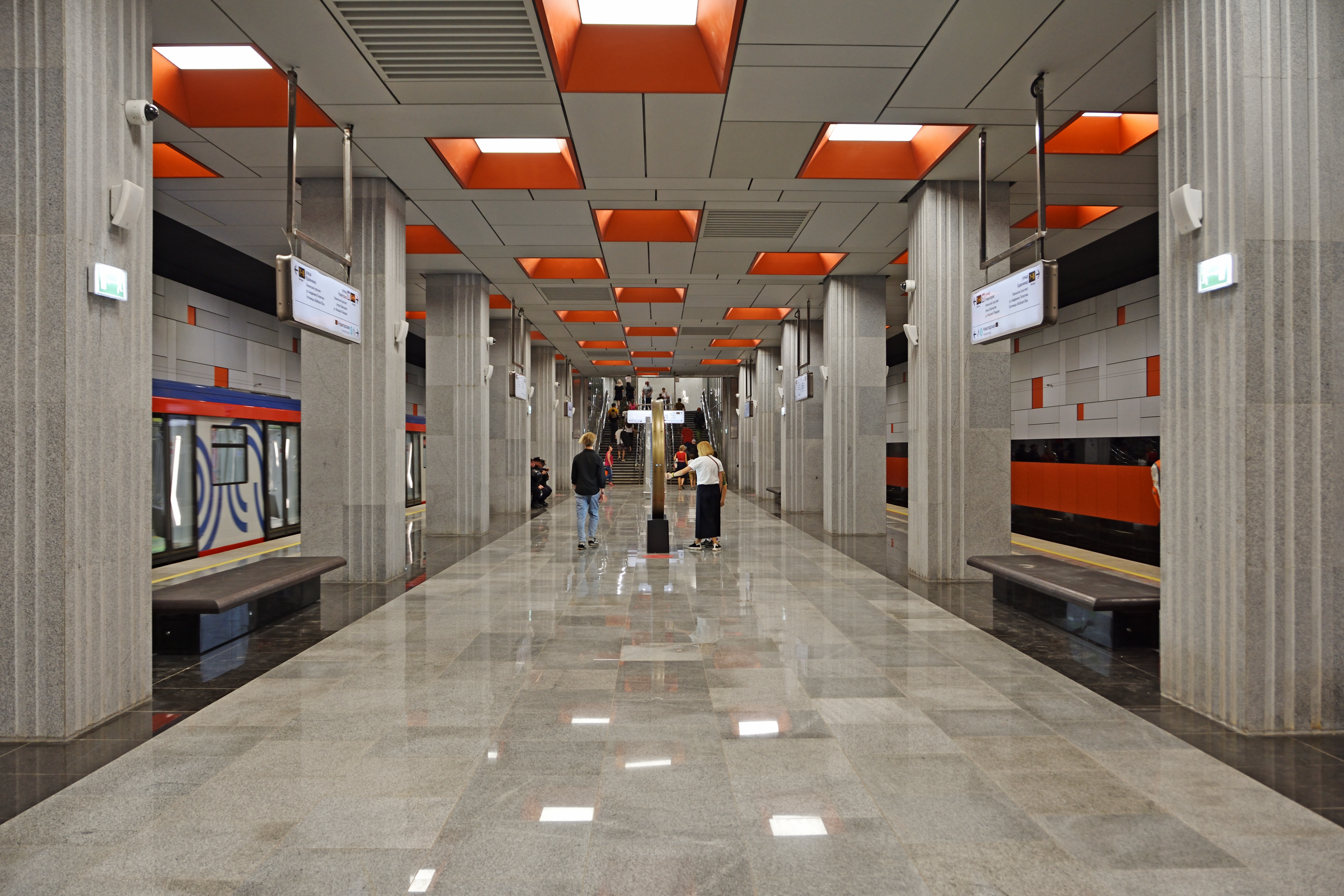

General information
- Location: Obruchevsky District, SWAO; Moscow; Russia
- Coordinates: 55.671516°N 37.521331°E
- System: Moscow Metro station
- Owner: Moskovsky Metropoliten
- Line: Troitskaya line

History
- Opened: 7 September 2024

Services
Preceding station	Moscow Metro	Following station
Universitet Druzhby Narodov towards Novomoskovskaya	Troitskaya line	Vavilovskaya towards Novatorskaya
Prospekt Vernadskogo anticlockwise / outer	Bolshaya Koltsevaya line transfer at Novatorskaya	Vorontsovskaya clockwise / inner
Route map
Location
- Location within Moscow Metro

Novatorskaya (Russian: Новаторская) is a Moscow Metro station. It is currently the northern terminus of Troitskaya line. It was opened on 7 September 2024 as part of the inaugural segment of the line, between Novatorskaya and Tyutchevskaya.

There is a transfer to the eponymous station of Bolshaya Koltsevaya line. The adjacent station is Universitet Druzhby Narodov.

The station is located at the intersection of Leninsky Avenue and Novatorov Street, hence the name of the station.

== Gallery ==
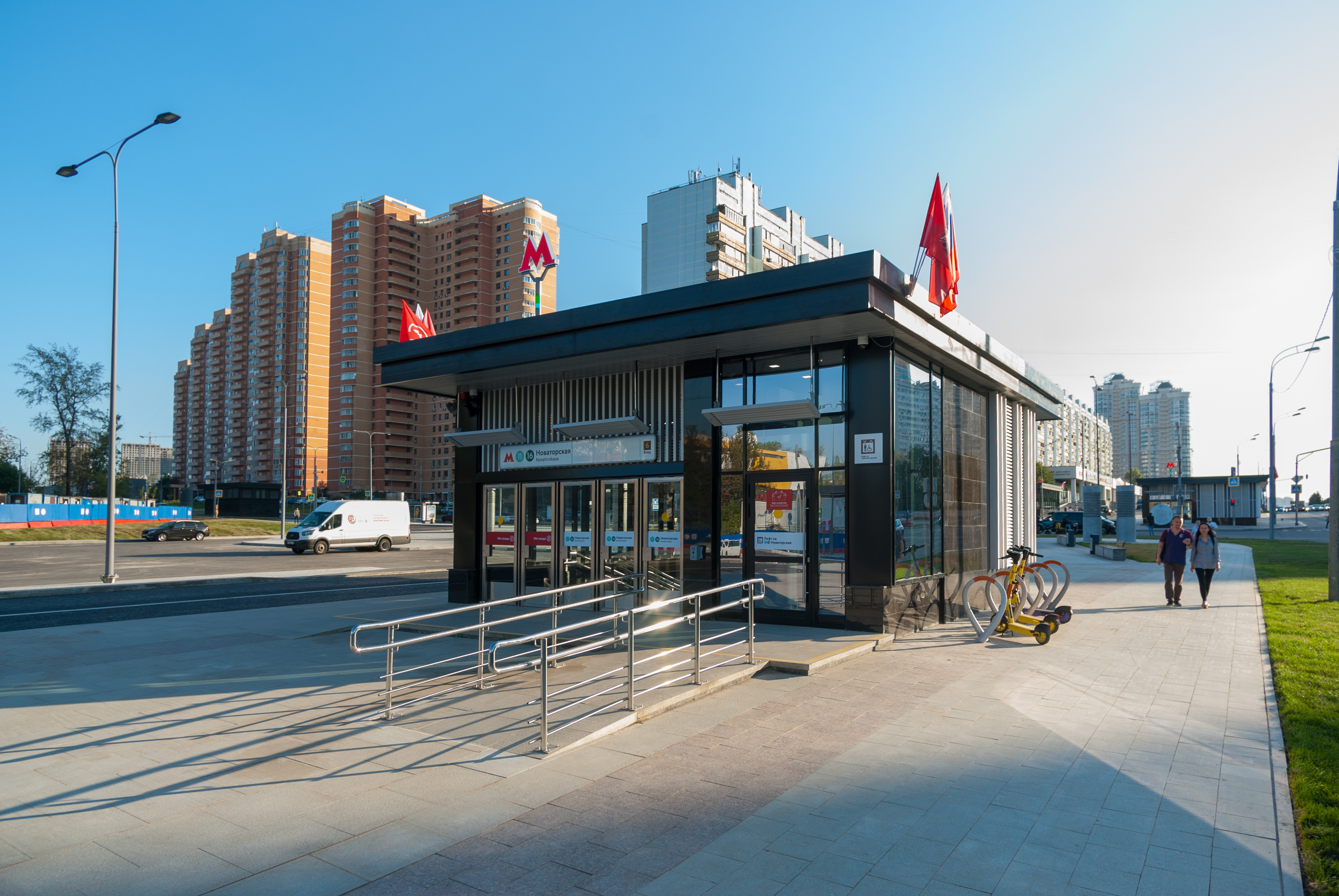

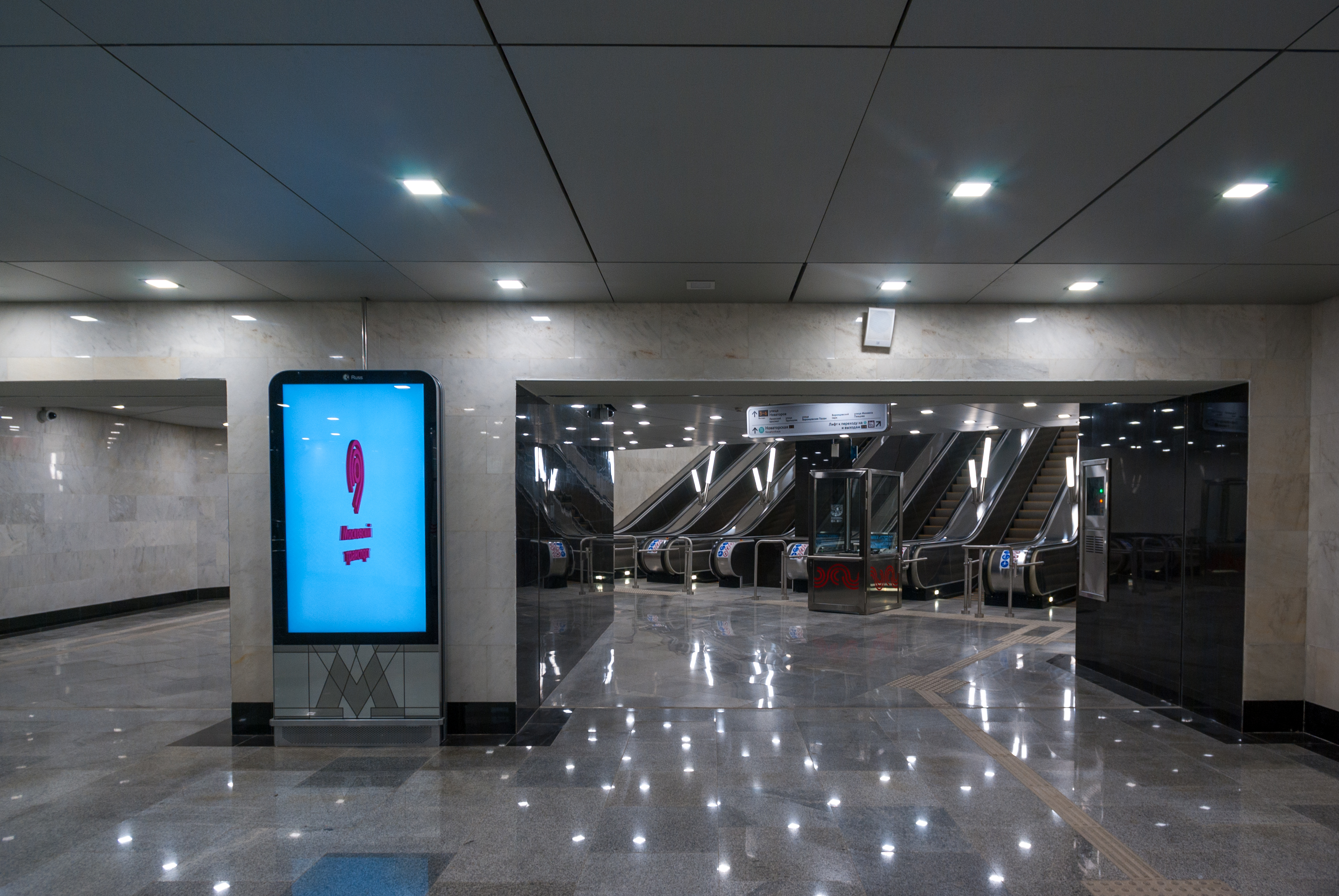

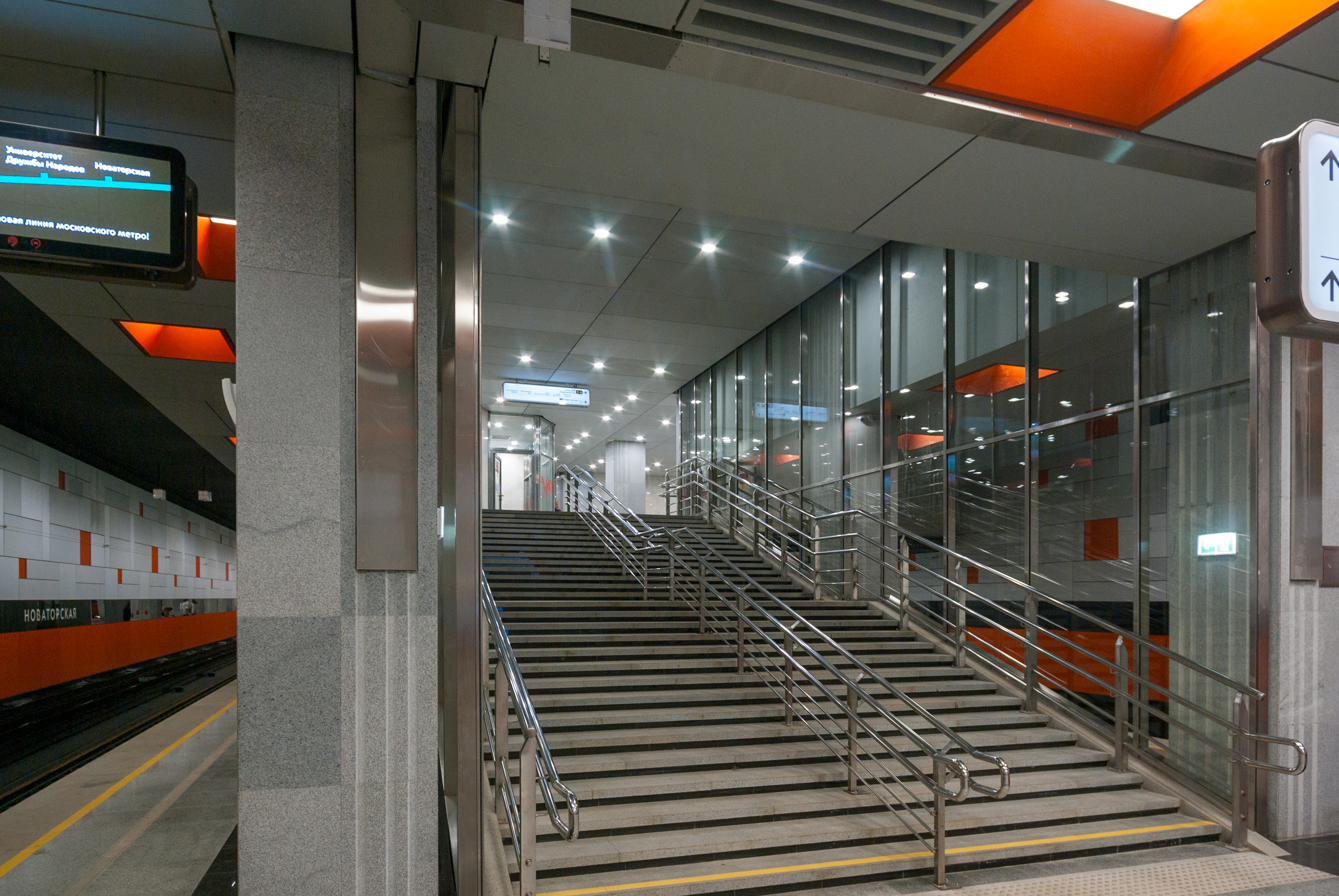
