= Novomoskovskaya (Troitskaya line) =

Moscow Metro station

Novomoskovskaya Новомосковская
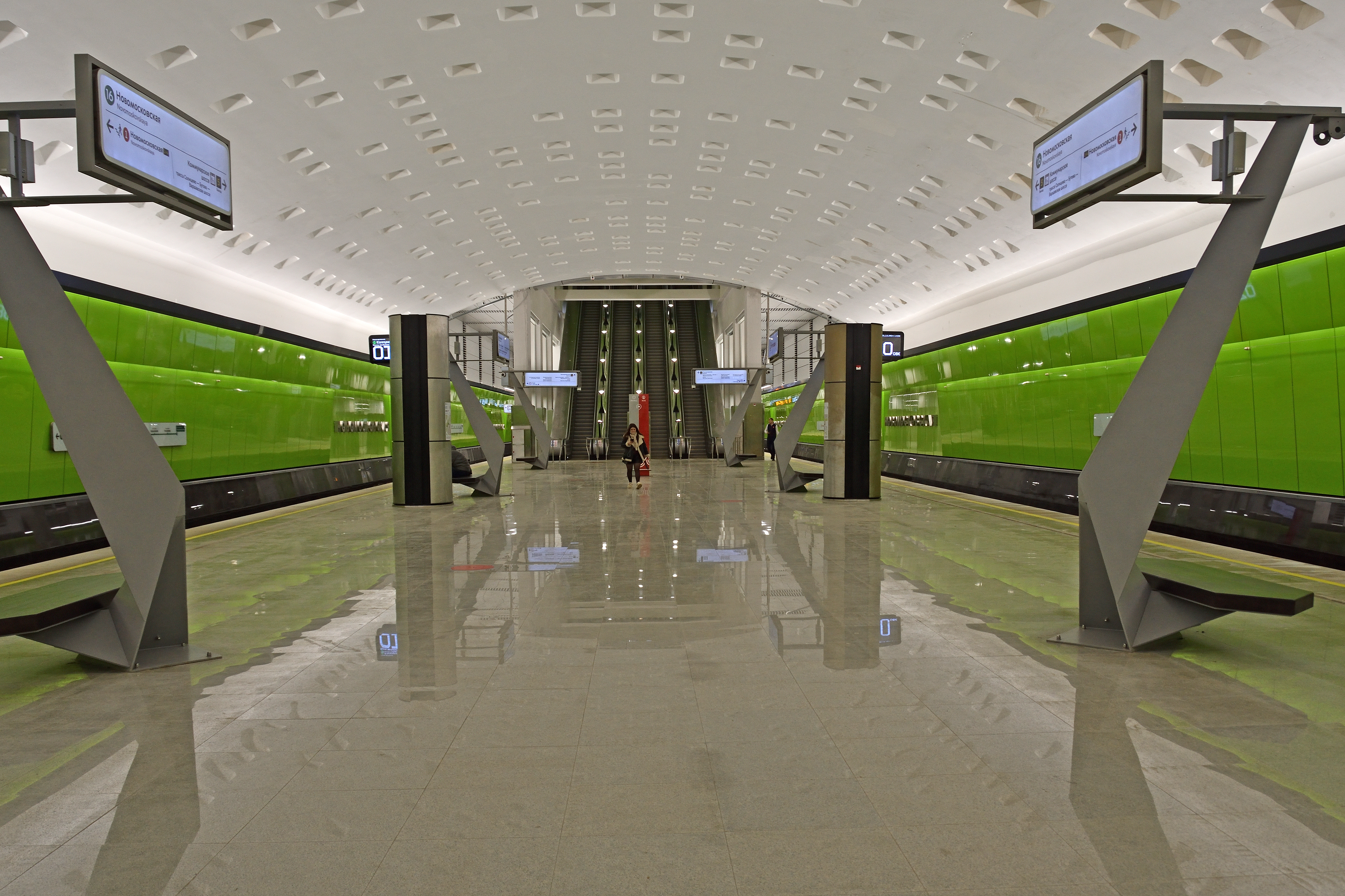

General information
- Location: NAO; Moscow; Russia
- Coordinates: 55.5606°N 37.4653°E
- System: Moscow Metro station
- Owner: Moskovsky Metropoliten
- Line: Troitskaya line

History
- Opened: 28 December 2024

Services
Preceding station	Moscow Metro	Following station
Terminus	Troitskaya line	Kommunarka towards Novatorskaya
Potapovo Terminus	Sokolnicheskaya line transfer at Novomoskovskaya	Olkhovaya towards Bulvar Rokossovskogo
Route map
Location
- Location within Moscow Metro

Novomoskovskaya (Russian: Новомосковская) is a station and the southern terminus of the Troitskaya line of the Moscow Metro. It was opened on 28 December 2024 as part of the three-station extension of the line, from Tyutchevskaya to Novomoskovskaya. It is the transfer station to Novomoskovskaya of the Sokolnicheskaya line. The adjacent station is Kommunarka.
