= Narodnoye Opolcheniye (Bolshaya Koltsevaya line) =

Moscow Metro station

Narodnoye Opolcheniye Народное Ополчение
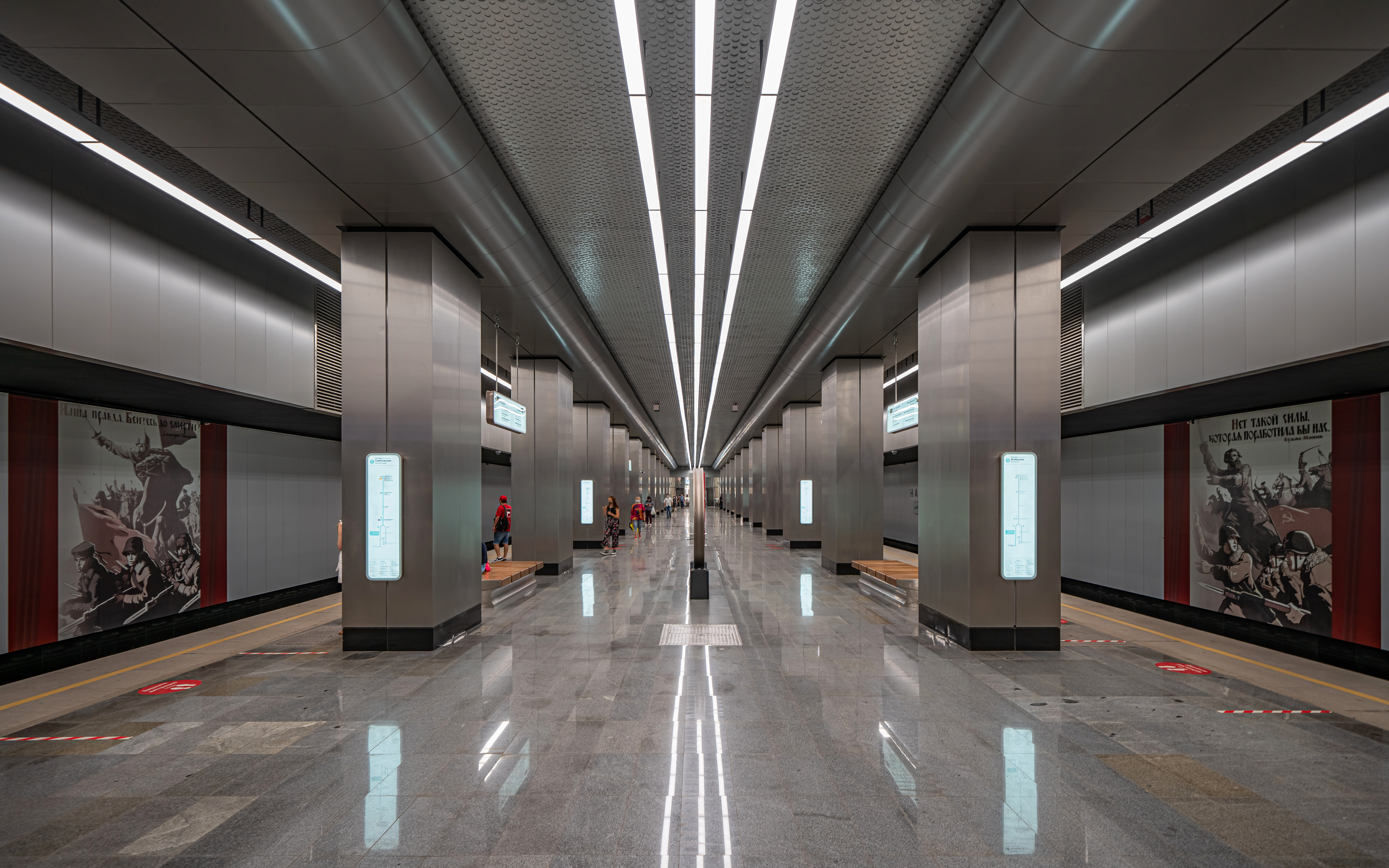

General information
- Location: Khoroshyovo-Mnyovniki District, North-Western Administrative Okrug; Moscow; Russia
- Coordinates: 55.7753°N 37.4844°E
- System: Moscow Metro station
- Owner: Moskovsky Metropoliten
- Line: Bolshaya Koltsevaya line
- Platforms: 1 island platform
- Tracks: 2

Construction
- Structure type: Shallow column station
- Depth: 28 metres (92 ft)
- Platform levels: 1

History
- Opened: 1 April 2021

Services
Preceding station	Moscow Metro	Following station
Mnyovniki anticlockwise / outer	Bolshaya Koltsevaya line	Khoroshyovskaya clockwise / inner
Preceding station	Moscow Metro	Following station
Bulvar Generala Karbysheva towards Ilyinskaya	Rublyovo-Arkhangelskaya line	Zvenigorodskaya towards Delovoy Tsentr
Route map
Bolshaya Koltsevaya line
Location
- Location within Moscow Metro

Video of station interiors (2021)

Narodnoye Opolcheniye (Russian: Народное Ополчение) is a station on the Bolshaya Koltsevaya line of the Moscow Metro. It opened on 1 April 2021.

== Name ==
During the construction of the Bolshaya Koltsevaya line, the station was named Ulitsa Narodnogo Opolcheniya ("People's Militia Street") after the nearby street of the same name. From March to May 2020, the station was named Mnyovniki in the design documentation (while the current Mnyovniki was planned to be renamed Terekhovo). In November 2020, it was proposed to name the station "Karamyshevskaya", and on December 8, Mayor of Moscow Sergey Sobyanin signed a decree assigning this name to the station. This was done for the convenience of navigation, since the Oktyabrskoe Pole station of Line 7 already exists on Narodnogo Opolcheniya Street. The name "Karamyshevskaya" was given after the Karamyshevo defence line constructed during the 1941 Battle of Moscow, which was defended by the 3rd Communist division of the People's Militia. In turn, the defence line was named after the village of Karamyshevo, which was located in this area and later became part of Moscow.

On 23 March 2021, a poll was initiated on the Active Citizen portal to change the station name. 55% of the poll participants voted for "Narodnoye Opolcheniye" and about 36% for "Karamyshevskaya".

On 5 September 2026, a transfer to the eponymous station of Rublyovo-Arkhangelskaya line was opened.
