= List of Moscow Metro stations =

There are 311 active stations of the Moscow Metro. Of these, 280 are on Moscow Metro proper and 31 stations are on the Moscow Central Circle. Two stations have been closed (the old Kaluzhskaya and the old Pervomayskaya stations). The monorail with six stations was also closed in June 2025.

By number of stations the Moscow Metro is ranked 8th, cf. List of metro systems. The deepest station of Moscow Metro, Park Pobedy, is the third-deepest metro station of the world.

== Active stations ==
=== Physical characteristics ===
Of the Moscow Metro's 236 stations, 80 are deep underground, 114 are shallow, and 42 (25 of them on the Central Circle) are at or above ground level. Of the latter there are 12 ground-level stations, four elevated stations, and one station (Vorobyovy Gory) on a bridge.

The deep stations comprise 55 triple-vaulted pylon stations, 19 triple-vaulted column stations, and one single-vault station.

The shallow stations comprise 72 spanned column stations (a large portion of them following the "centipede" design), 33 single-vaulted stations (Kharkov technology), and three single-spanned stations.

Two stations have three tracks, and one has double halls. Seven of the stations have side platforms (only one of which is subterranean). In addition, there were two temporary stations within rail yards.

==== Gallery of station types ====
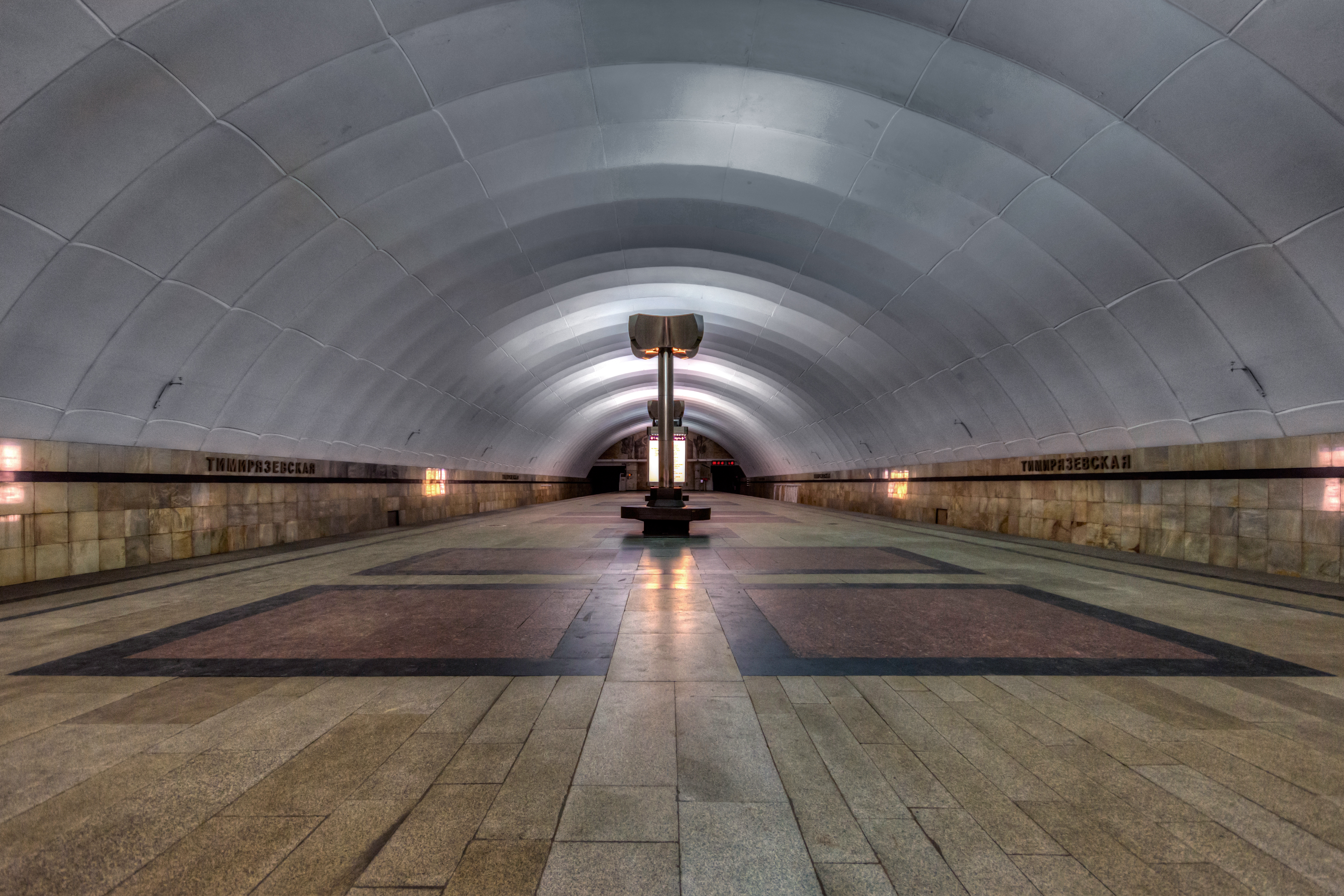
Timiryazevskaya – single-span underground station

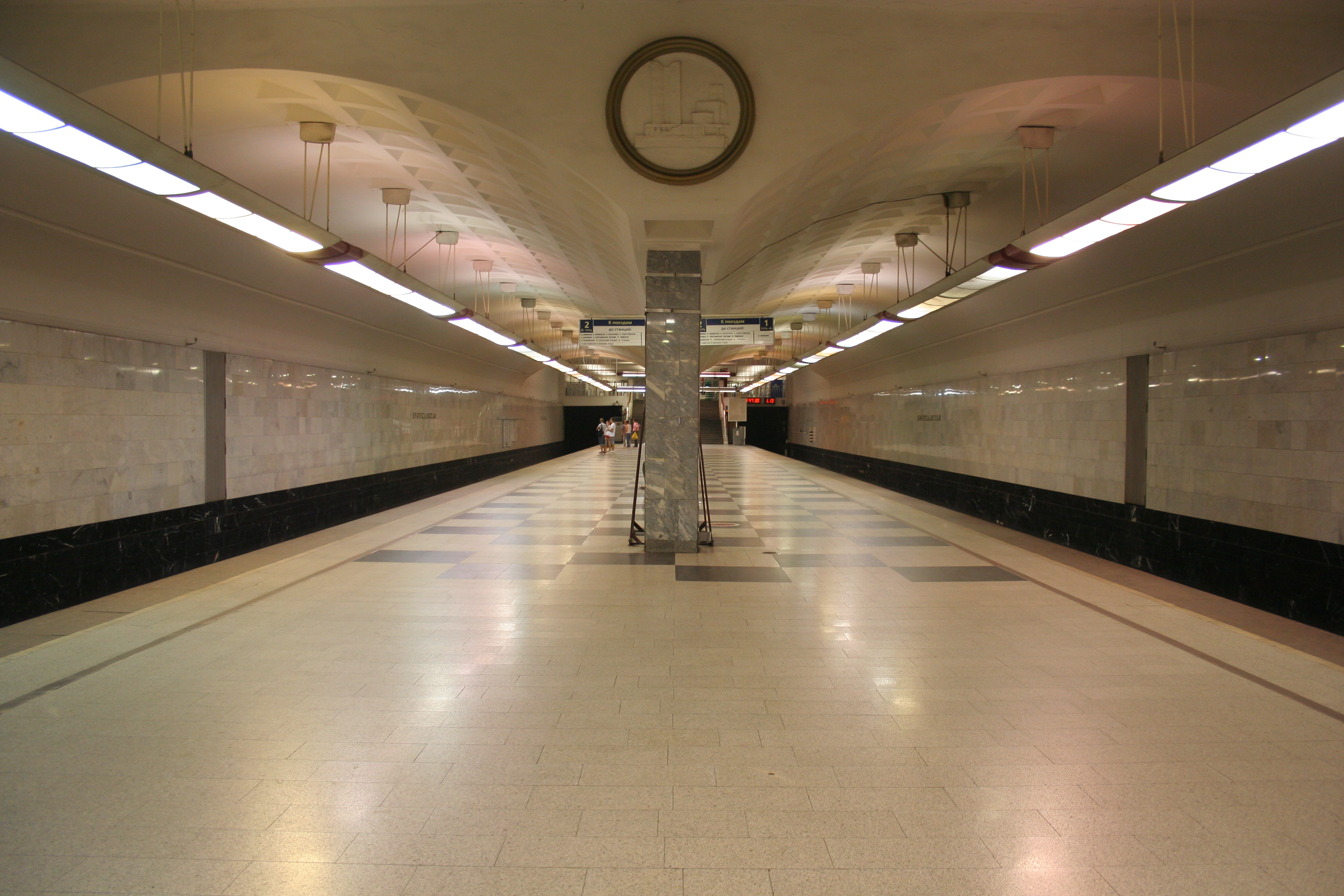
Bratislavskaya – double-span column underground station

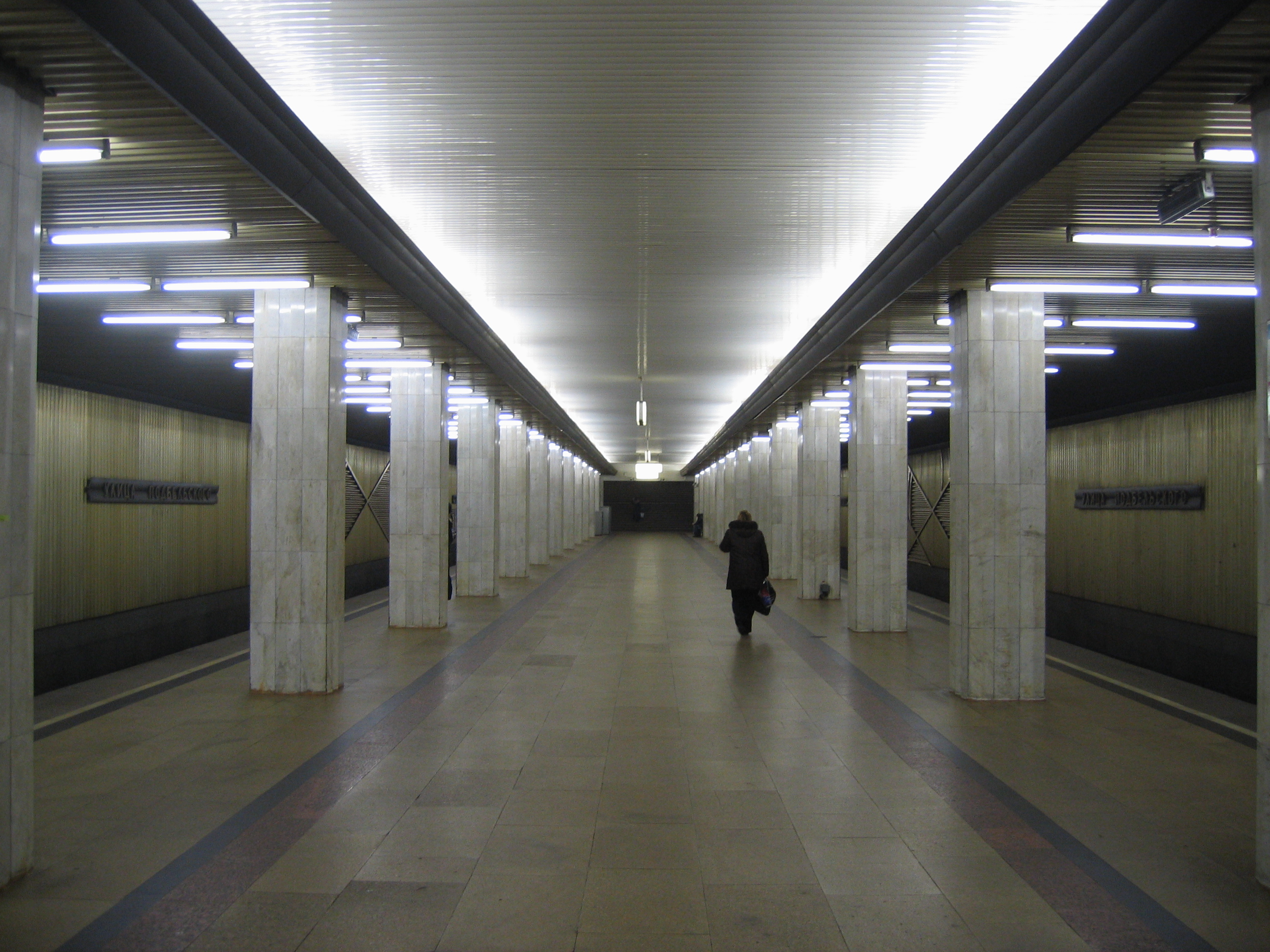
Bulvar Rokossovskogo – triple-span column underground station

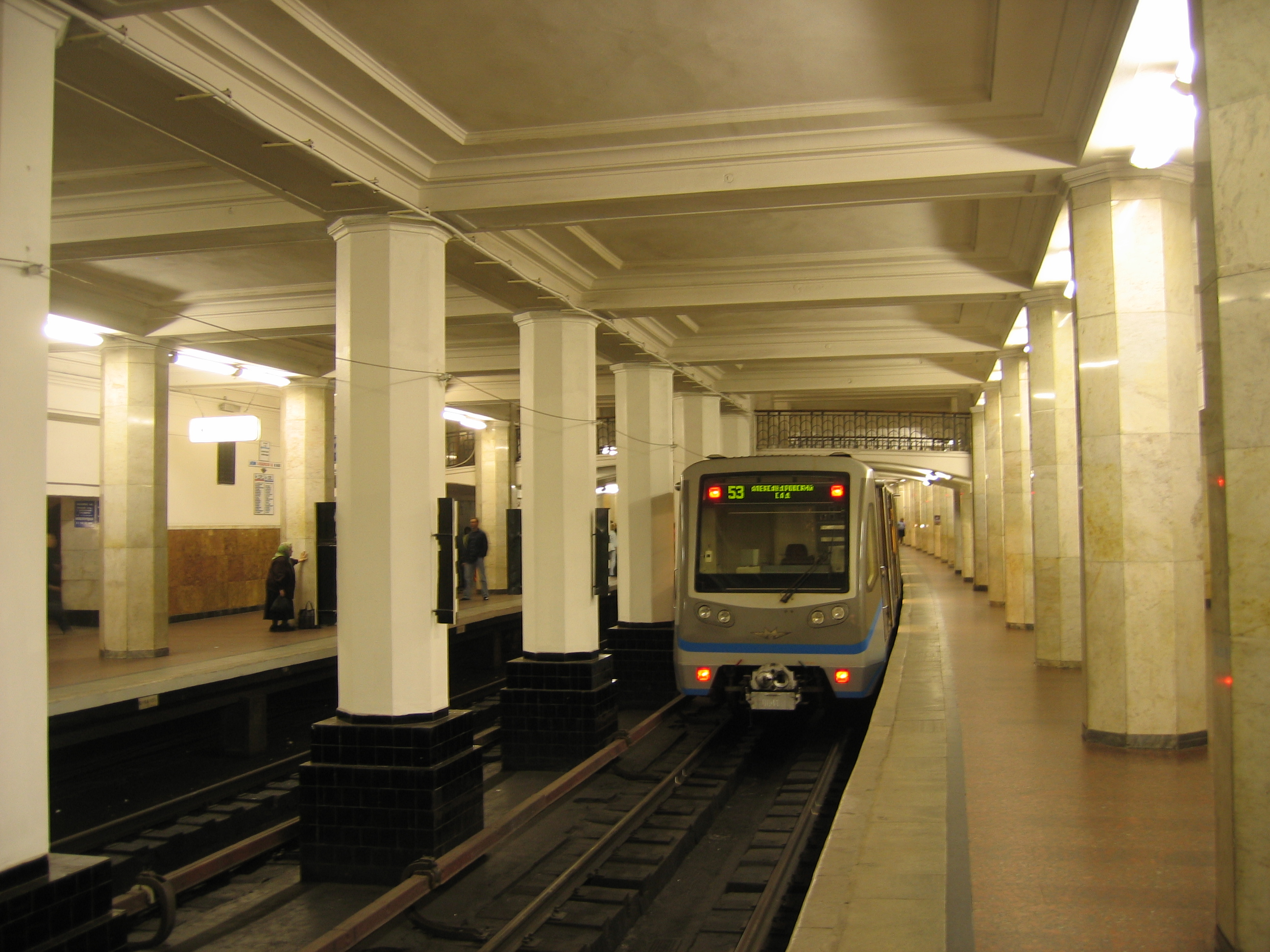
Aleksandrovsky Sad, the only four-span column station

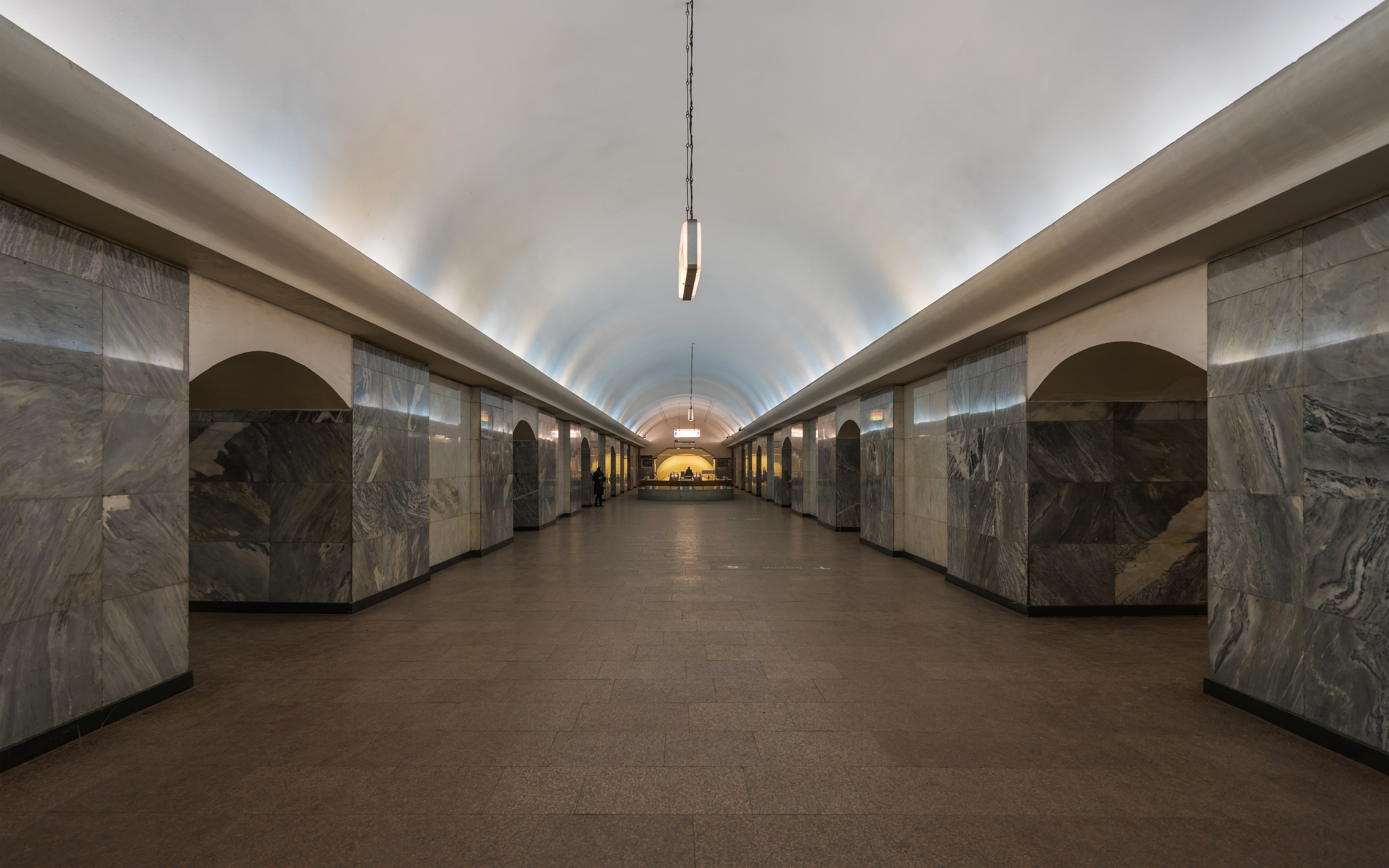
Chistyye Prudy – triple-vault pylon underground station

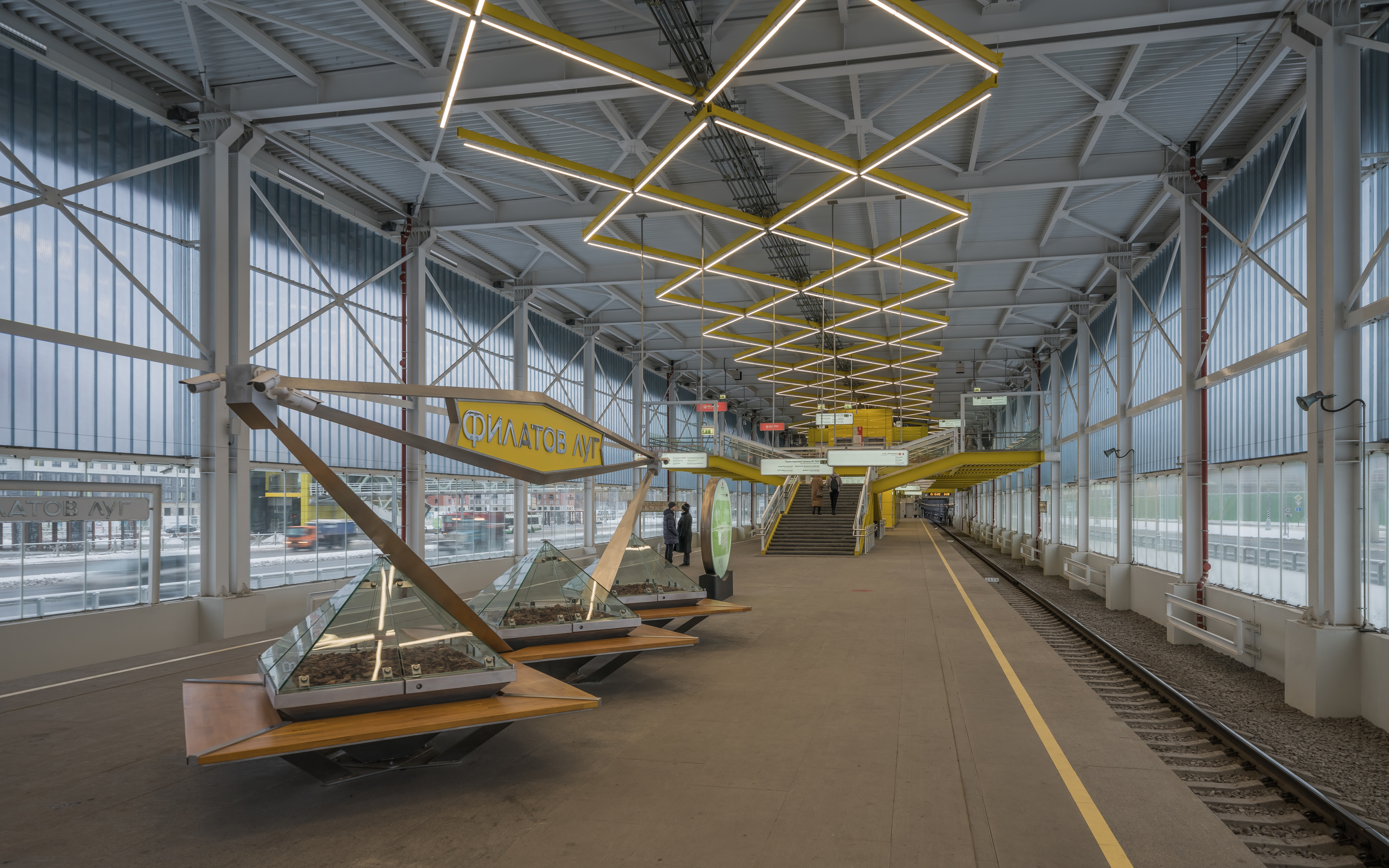
Filatov Lug, open surface station

=== Key to transfer details ===
Symbol	Description	Exit fare-paid area?
none	Direct connection to other station	no
( )	Indirect connection via station on another line	no
[ ]	Cross-platform interchange with other line	no
{ }	Out of station interchange inside dedicated transport hub	yes
< >	Out of station interchange across street	yes

=== List ===
L	English transcription	Russian Cyrillic	Transfer	Opened	Elev.	Type	Coordinates	Pic.
#1 Sokolnicheskaya line	Bulvar Rokossovskogo; Ulitsa Podbelskogo (1990–2014)	Бульвар Рокоссовского; Улица Подбельского (1990–2014)	<>	1990-08-01	−8 m	column, triple-span	55.8148°N 37.7342°E	Category:Bulvar Rokossovskogo (Moscow Metro) on Wikimedia Commons
#1 Sokolnicheskaya line	Cherkizovskaya	Черкизовская	{ }	1990-08-01	−9 m	single-vault, shallow	55.8038°N 37.7448°E	Category:Cherkizovskaya on Wikimedia Commons
#1 Sokolnicheskaya line	Preobrazhenskaya Ploshchad	Преображенская площадь		1965-12-31	−8 m	column, triple-span	55.7963°N 37.7151°E	Category:Preobrazhenskaya Ploshchad on Wikimedia Commons
#1 Sokolnicheskaya line	Sokolniki	Сокольники	Transfer for #11 Bolshaya Koltsevaya line at Sokolniki	1935-05-15	−9 m	column, triple-span	55.7888°N 37.6802°E	Category:Sokolniki (Sokolnicheskaya Line) on Wikimedia Commons
#1 Sokolnicheskaya line	Krasnoselskaya	Красносельская		1935-05-15	−8 m	column, double-span	55.7801°N 37.6673°E	Category:Krasnoselskaya (Moscow Metro) on Wikimedia Commons
#1 Sokolnicheskaya line	Komsomolskaya	Комсомольская	Transfer for #5 Koltsevaya line at Komsomolskaya	1935-05-15	−8 m	column, triple-span	55.7753°N 37.6562°E	Category:Komsomolskaya-Radialnaya on Wikimedia Commons
#1 Sokolnicheskaya line	Krasnye Vorota; Lermontovskaya (1962–1986)	Красные ворота Лермонтовская (1962–1986)		1935-05-15	−31 m	pylon, triple-vault	55.7690°N 37.6487°E	Category:Krasniye Vorota on Wikimedia Commons
#1 Sokolnicheskaya line	Chistye Prudy; Kirovskaya (1935–1990)	Чистые пруды Кировская (1935–1990)	Transfer for #6 Kaluzhsko-Rizhskaya line at Turgenevskaya Transfer for #10 Lyublinsko-Dmitrovskaya line at Sretensky Bulvar	1935-05-15	−35 m	pylon, triple-vault	55.7657°N 37.6388°E	Category:Chistiye Prudy (Moscow Metro) on Wikimedia Commons
#1 Sokolnicheskaya line	Lubyanka; Dzerzhinskaya (1935–1990)	Лубянка; Дзержинская (1935–1990)	Transfer for #7 Tagansko-Krasnopresnenskaya line at Kuznetsky Most	1935-05-15	−32.5 m	pylon, triple-vault	55.7597°N 37.6272°E	Category:Lubyanka (Moscow Metro) on Wikimedia Commons
#1 Sokolnicheskaya line	Okhotny Ryad; Imeni Kaganovicha (1955–1957); Prospekt Marksa (1961–1990)	Охотный ряд Имени Кагановича (1955–1957); Проспект Маркса (1961–1990)	Transfer for #2 Zamoskvoretskaya line at Teatralnaya Transfer for #3 Arbatsko-Pokrovskaya line at Ploshchad Revolyutsii	1935-05-15	−15 m	pylon, triple-vault	55.7577°N 37.6166°E	Category:Okhotny Ryad (Moscow Metro) on Wikimedia Commons
#1 Sokolnicheskaya line	Biblioteka Imeni Lenina	Библиотека имени Ленина	Transfer for #3 Arbatsko-Pokrovskaya line at Arbatskaya Transfer for #4 Filyovskaya line at Aleksandrovsky Sad Transfer for #4A Filyovskaya line at Aleksandrovsky Sad Transfer for #9 Serpukhovsko-Timiryazevskaya line at Borovitskaya	1935-05-15	−12 m	single-vault, shallow	55.7512°N 37.6100°E	Category:Biblioteka Imeni Lenina on Wikimedia Commons
#1 Sokolnicheskaya line	Kropotkinskaya; Dvorets Sovetov (1935–1957)	Кропоткинская; Дворец Советов (1935–1957)		1935-05-15	−13 m	column, triple-span	55.7453°N 37.6037°E	Category:Kropotkinskaya on Wikimedia Commons
#1 Sokolnicheskaya line	Park Kultury; TsPKiO imeni Gorkogo (1935–1980)	Парк культуры ЦПКиО имени Горького (1935–1980)	Transfer for #5 Koltsevaya line at Park Kultury	1935-05-15	−10.5 m	column, triple-span	55.7356°N 37.5943°E	Category:Park Kultury-Radialnaya on Wikimedia Commons
#1 Sokolnicheskaya line	Frunzenskaya	Фрунзенская		1957-05-01	−42 m	pylon, triple-vault	55.7267°N 37.5786°E	Category:Frunzenskaya (Moscow Metro) on Wikimedia Commons
#1 Sokolnicheskaya line	Sportivnaya	Спортивная	<>	1957-05-01	−42 m	pylon, triple-vault	55.7233°N 37.5639°E	Category:Sportivnaya (Moscow Metro) on Wikimedia Commons
#1 Sokolnicheskaya line	Vorobyovy Gory; Leninskiye Gory (1959–1983)	Воробьёвы горы Ленинские горы (1959–1983)		1959-01-12	+10 m	within bridge	55.7103°N 37.5592°E	Category:Vorobyovy Gory (Moscow Metro) on Wikimedia Commons
#1 Sokolnicheskaya line	Universitet	Университет		1959-01-12	−26.5 m	pylon, triple-vault	55.6926°N 37.5333°E	Category:Universitet (Moscow Metro) on Wikimedia Commons
#1 Sokolnicheskaya line	Prospekt Vernadskogo	Проспект Вернадского	Transfer for #11 Bolshaya Koltsevaya line at Prospekt Vernadskogo	1963-12-30	−8 m	column, triple-span	55.6771°N 37.5060°E	Category:Prospekt Vernadskogo (Sokolnicheskaya Line) on Wikimedia Commons
#1 Sokolnicheskaya line	Yugo-Zapadnaya	Юго-Западная		1963-12-30	−8 m	column, triple-span	55.6637°N 37.4833°E	Category:Yugo-Zapadnaya (Moscow Metro) on Wikimedia Commons
#1 Sokolnicheskaya line	Troparyovo	Тропарёво		2014-12-08	−12 m	single-vault, shallow	55.6459°N 37.4725°E	Category:Troparyovo (Moscow Metro) on Wikimedia Commons
#1 Sokolnicheskaya line	Rumyantsevo	Румянцево		2016-01-18	−12 m	column, triple-span	55.6330°N 37.4419°E	Category:Rumyantsevo (Moscow Metro) on Wikimedia Commons
#1 Sokolnicheskaya line	Salaryevo	Саларьево		2016-02-15	−12 m	column, triple-span	55.6227°N 37.4240°E	Category:Salaryevo (Moscow Metro) on Wikimedia Commons
#1 Sokolnicheskaya line	Filatov Lug	Филатов Луг		2019-06-20	0 m	surface, open	55.601367°N 37.407645°E	Category:Filatov Lug (Moscow Metro) on Wikimedia Commons
#1 Sokolnicheskaya line	Prokshino	Прокшино		2019-06-20	0 m	surface, open	55.586242°N 37.433802°E	Category:Prokshino (Moscow Metro) on Wikimedia Commons
#1 Sokolnicheskaya line	Olkhovaya	Ольховая		2019-06-20	−5 m	single-span, shallow	55.568643°N 37.459332°E	Category:Olkhovaya (Moscow Metro) on Wikimedia Commons
#1 Sokolnicheskaya line	Novomoskovskaya; Kommunarka (2019–2024)	Новомосковская; Коммунарка (2019–2024)	Transfer for #16 Troitskaya line at Novomoskovskaya	2019-09-05	−5 m	column, triple-span	55.560396°N 37.468220°E	Category:Potapovo (Moscow Metro) on Wikimedia Commons
#1 Sokolnicheskaya line	Potapovo	Потапово		2024-09-05			55.552640°N 37.492765°E	Category:Novomoskovskaya (Moscow Metro, Sokolnicheskaya Line) on Wikimedia Commons
#2 Zamoskvoretskaya line	Khovrino	Ховрино		2017-12-31	−14 m	column, double-span	55.8791°N 37.4822°E	Category:Khovrino (Moscow Metro) on Wikimedia Commons
#2 Zamoskvoretskaya line	Belomorskaya	Беломорская		2018-12-20	−25 m	column, double-span	55.8658°N 37.4764°E	Category:Belomorskaya (Moscow Metro) on Wikimedia Commons
#2 Zamoskvoretskaya line	Rechnoy Vokzal	Речной вокзал		1964-12-31	−6 m	column, triple-span	55.8549°N 37.4761°E	Category:Rechnoy Vokzal (Moscow Metro) on Wikimedia Commons
#2 Zamoskvoretskaya line	Vodny Stadion	Водный стадион		1964-12-31	−6 m	column, triple-span	55.8398°N 37.4867°E	Category:Vodny Stadion on Wikimedia Commons
#2 Zamoskvoretskaya line	Voykovskaya	Войковская	<>	1964-12-31	−7 m	column, triple-span	55.8190°N 37.4980°E	Category:Voykovskaya on Wikimedia Commons
#2 Zamoskvoretskaya line	Sokol	Сокол		1938-09-11	−9.6 m	column, double-span	55.8051°N 37.5153°E	Category:Sokol (Moscow Metro) on Wikimedia Commons
#2 Zamoskvoretskaya line	Aeroport	Аэропорт		1938-09-11	−10 m	single-vault, shallow	55.8003°N 37.5329°E	Category:Aeroport (Moscow Metro) on Wikimedia Commons
#2 Zamoskvoretskaya line	Dinamo	Динамо	Transfer for #11 Bolshaya Koltsevaya line at Petrovsky Park	1938-09-11	−39.6 m	pylon, triple-vault	55.7897°N 37.5580°E	Category:Dinamo (Moscow Metro) on Wikimedia Commons
#2 Zamoskvoretskaya line	Belorusskaya	Белорусская	Transfer for #5 Koltsevaya line at Belorusskaya	1938-09-11	−33.1 m	pylon, triple-vault	55.7767°N 37.5835°E	Category:Belorusskaya-Radialnaya on Wikimedia Commons
#2 Zamoskvoretskaya line	Mayakovskaya	Маяковская		1938-09-11	−33.1 m	column, triple-vault	55.7701°N 37.5958°E	Category:Mayakovskaya (Moscow Metro station) on Wikimedia Commons
#2 Zamoskvoretskaya line	Tverskaya; Gorkovskaya (1979–1990)	Тверская; Горьковская (1979–1990)	Transfer for #7 Tagansko-Krasnopresnenskaya line at Pushkinskaya Transfer for #9 Serpukhovsko-Timiryazevskaya line at Chekhovskaya	1979-07-20	−42 m	pylon, triple-vault	55.7647°N 37.6065°E	Category:Tverskaya (Moscow Metro) on Wikimedia Commons
#2 Zamoskvoretskaya line	Teatralnaya; Ploshchad Sverdlova (1938–1990)	Театральная; Площадь Свердлова (1938–1990)	Transfer for #1 Sokolnicheskaya line at Okhotny Ryad Transfer for #3 Arbatsko-Pokrovskaya line at Ploshchad Revolyutsii	1938-09-11	−33.9 m	pylon, triple-vault	55.7578°N 37.6190°E	Category:Teatralnaya (Moscow Metro) on Wikimedia Commons
#2 Zamoskvoretskaya line	Novokuznetskaya	Новокузнецкая	Transfer for #6 Kaluzhsko-Rizhskaya line at Tretyakovskaya Transfer for #8 Kalininskaya line at Tretyakovskaya	1943-11-20	−37.5 m	pylon, triple-vault	55.7415°N 37.6295°E	Category:Novokuznetskaya (Moscow Metro) on Wikimedia Commons
#2 Zamoskvoretskaya line	Paveletskaya	Павелецкая	Transfer for #5 Koltsevaya line at Paveletskaya	1943-11-20	−33.5 m	column, triple-vault	55.7305°N 37.6377°E	Category:Paveletskaya-Radialnaya on Wikimedia Commons
#2 Zamoskvoretskaya line	Avtozavodskaya; Zavod imeni Stalina (1943–1956)	Автозаводская; Завод имени Сталина (1943–1956)	<>	1943-01-01	−11 m	column, triple-span	55.7074°N 37.6576°E	Category:Avtozavodskaya (Moscow Metro) on Wikimedia Commons
#2 Zamoskvoretskaya line	Tekhnopark	Технопарк		2015-12-28	0 m	surface, open	55.6950°N 37.6641°E	Category:Tekhnopark (Moscow Metro) on Wikimedia Commons
#2 Zamoskvoretskaya line	Kolomenskaya	Коломенская		1969-08-11	−9 m	column, triple-span	55.6785°N 37.6638°E	Category:Kolomenskaya (Moscow Metro) on Wikimedia Commons
#2 Zamoskvoretskaya line	Kashirskaya	Каширская	Transfer for #11 Bolshaya Koltsevaya line at Kashirskaya	1969-08-11	−7 m	column, triple-span	55.6551°N 37.6487°E	Category:Kashirskaya (Moscow Metro) on Wikimedia Commons
#2 Zamoskvoretskaya line	Kantemirovskaya	Кантемировская		1984-12-30	−8 m	single-vault, shallow	55.6358°N 37.6564°E	Category:Kantemirovskaya (Moscow Metro) on Wikimedia Commons
#2 Zamoskvoretskaya line	Tsaritsyno; Lenino (1984–1990)	Царицыно; Ленино (1984–1990)		1984-12-30	−8 m	column, triple-span	55.6214°N 37.6694°E	Category:Tsaritsyno (Moscow Metro) on Wikimedia Commons
#2 Zamoskvoretskaya line	Orekhovo	Орехово		1984-12-30	−9 m	column, triple-span	55.6132°N 37.6949°E	Category:Orekhovo (Moscow Metro) on Wikimedia Commons
#2 Zamoskvoretskaya line	Domodedovskaya	Домодедовская		1985-09-07	−9.5 m	column, triple-span	55.6108°N 37.7186°E	Category:Domodedovskaya (Moscow Metro) on Wikimedia Commons
#2 Zamoskvoretskaya line	Krasnogvardeyskaya	Красногвардейская	Transfer for #10 Lyublinsko-Dmitrovskaya line at Zyablikovo	1985-09-07	−9 m	single-vault, shallow	55.6137°N 37.7444°E	Category:Krasnogvardeyskaya (Moscow Metro) on Wikimedia Commons
#2 Zamoskvoretskaya line	Alma-Atinskaya	Алма-Атинская		2012-12-24	−10 m	single-vault, shallow	55.6326°N 37.7660°E	Category:Alma-Atinskaya (Moscow Metro) on Wikimedia Commons
#3 Arbatsko-Pokrovskaya line	Pyatnitskoye Shosse	Пятницкое Шоссе		2012-12-28	−11 m	column, double-span	55.8563°N 37.3544°E	Category:Pyatnitskoye Shosse (Moscow Metro) on Wikimedia Commons
#3 Arbatsko-Pokrovskaya line	Mitino	Митино		2009-12-26	−14 m	single-vault, shallow	55.8457°N 37.3622°E	Category:Mitino (Moscow Metro) on Wikimedia Commons
#3 Arbatsko-Pokrovskaya line	Volokolamskaya	Волоколамская		2009-12-26	−14 m	column, triple-span	55.8354°N 37.3822°E	Category:Volokolamskaya (Moscow Metro) on Wikimedia Commons
#3 Arbatsko-Pokrovskaya line	Myakinino	Мякинино		2009-12-26	0 m	surface, single-span	55.8252°N 37.3852°E	Category:Myakinino (Moscow Metro) on Wikimedia Commons
#3 Arbatsko-Pokrovskaya line	Strogino	Строгино		2008-01-07	−8 m	single-vault, shallow	55.8038°N 37.4031°E	Category:Strogino (Moscow Metro) on Wikimedia Commons
#3 Arbatsko-Pokrovskaya line	Krylatskoye	Крылатское		1989-12-31	−9.5 m	single-vault, shallow	55.7567°N 37.4081°E	Category:Krylatskoe (Moscow Metro) on Wikimedia Commons
#3 Arbatsko-Pokrovskaya line	Molodyozhnaya	Молодёжная		1965-07-05	−6.5 m	column, triple-span	55.7408°N 37.4168°E	Category:Molodyozhnaya (Moscow Metro) on Wikimedia Commons
#3 Arbatsko-Pokrovskaya line	Kuntsevskaya	Кунцевская	[]	2008-01-07	0 m	surface, open	55.7307°N 37.4459°E	Category:Kuntsevskaya (Arbatsko-Pokrovskaya and Filyovskaya Lines) on Wikimedia Commons
#3 Arbatsko-Pokrovskaya line	Slavyansky Bulvar	Славянский бульвар		2008-09-07	−8.5 m	single-vault, shallow	55.7296°N 37.4706°E	Category:Slavyansky Bulvar (Moscow Metro) on Wikimedia Commons
#3 Arbatsko-Pokrovskaya line	Park Pobedy	Парк Победы	[]	2003-05-06	-84 m	pylon, triple-vault	55.7362°N 37.5182°E	Category:Park Pobedy (Moscow Metro) on Wikimedia Commons
#3 Arbatsko-Pokrovskaya line	Kiyevskaya	Киевская	Transfer for #4 Filyovskaya line at Kiyevskaya Transfer for #4A Filyovskaya line at Kiyevskaya Transfer for #5 Koltsevaya line at Kiyevskaya	1953-04-05	−38 m	pylon, triple-vault	55.7442°N 37.5645°E	Category:Kievskaya (Arbatsko-Pokrovskaya Line) on Wikimedia Commons
#3 Arbatsko-Pokrovskaya line	Smolenskaya	Смоленская		1953-04-05	−50 m	pylon, triple-vault	55.7474°N 37.5823°E	Category:Smolenskaya (Arbatsko-Pokrovskaya Line) on Wikimedia Commons
#3 Arbatsko-Pokrovskaya line	Arbatskaya	Арбатская	Transfer for #1 Sokolnicheskaya line at Biblioteka Imeni Lenina Transfer for #4 Filyovskaya line at Aleksandrovsky Sad Transfer for #4A Filyovskaya line at Aleksandrovsky Sad Transfer for #9 Serpukhovsko-Timiryazevskaya line at Borovitskaya	1953-04-05	−41 m	pylon, triple-vault	55.7522°N 37.6061°E	Category:Arbatskaya (Arbatsko-Pokrovskaya Line) on Wikimedia Commons
#3 Arbatsko-Pokrovskaya line	Ploshchad Revolyutsii	Площадь Революции	Transfer for #2 Zamoskvoretskaya line at Teatralnaya Transfer for #1 Sokolnicheskaya line at Okhotny Ryad	1938-03-13	−33.6 m	pylon, triple-vault	55.7566°N 37.6216°E	Category:Ploshchad Revolyutsii (Moscow Metro) on Wikimedia Commons
#3 Arbatsko-Pokrovskaya line	Kurskaya	Курская	Transfer for #5 Koltsevaya line at Kurskaya Transfer for #10 Lyublinsko-Dmitrovskaya line at Chkalovskaya	1938-03-13	−30.7 m	pylon, triple-vault	55.7576°N 37.6577°E	Category:Kurskaya-Radialnaya on Wikimedia Commons
#3 Arbatsko-Pokrovskaya line	Baumanskaya	Бауманская		1944-01-18	−32.5 m	pylon, triple-vault	55.7730°N 37.6806°E	Category:Baumanskaya (Moscow Metro) on Wikimedia Commons
#3 Arbatsko-Pokrovskaya line	Elektrozavodskaya	Электрозаводская	<>	1944-05-15	−31.5 m	pylon, triple-vault	55.7817°N 37.7037°E	Category:Elektrozavodskaya (Arbatsko-Pokrovskaya Line) on Wikimedia Commons
#3 Arbatsko-Pokrovskaya line	Semyonovskaya; Stalinskaya (1944–1961)	Семёновская; Сталинская (1944–1961)		1944-01-18	−40 m	pylon, triple-vault	55.7833°N 37.7208°E	Category:Semyonovskaya (Moscow Metro) on Wikimedia Commons
#3 Arbatsko-Pokrovskaya line	Partizanskaya; Izmailovsky park kultury i otdyha imeni Stalina (1944-1947); Izmailovskaya (1947–1963); Izmailovsky Park (1963–2005)	Партизанская; Измайловский парк культуры и отдыха имени Сталина (1944–1947); Измайловская (1947–1963); Измайловский парк (1963–2005)	<>	1944-01-18	−9 m	column, triple-span	55.7886°N 37.7506°E	Category:Partizanskaya (Moscow Metro) on Wikimedia Commons
#3 Arbatsko-Pokrovskaya line	Izmaylovskaya; Izmailovsky Park (1961–1963)	Измайловская; Измайловский парк (1961–1963)		1961-10-21	0 m	surface, open	55.7878°N 37.7814°E	Category:Izmaylovskaya (Moscow Metro) on Wikimedia Commons
#3 Arbatsko-Pokrovskaya line	Pervomayskaya	Первомайская		1961-10-21	−7 m	column, triple-span	55.7948°N 37.7993°E	Category:Pervomayskaya (Moscow Metro) on Wikimedia Commons
#3 Arbatsko-Pokrovskaya line	Shchyolkovskaya	Щёлковская		1963-07-22	−8 m	column, triple-span	55.8094°N 37.7986°E	Category:Shchyolkovskaya on Wikimedia Commons
#4 Filyovskaya line	Kuntsevskaya	Кунцевская	[]	1965-08-31	0 m	surface, open	55.7307°N 37.4459°E	Category:Kuntsevskaya (Arbatsko-Pokrovskaya and Filyovskaya Lines) on Wikimedia Commons
#4 Filyovskaya line	Pionerskaya	Пионерская		1961-10-13	0 m	surface, open	55.7360°N 37.4671°E	Category:Pionerskaya (Moscow Metro) on Wikimedia Commons
#4 Filyovskaya line	Filyovsky Park	Филёвский парк		1961-10-13	0 m	surface, open	55.7396°N 37.4833°E	Category:Filyovsky Park (Moscow Metro) on Wikimedia Commons
#4 Filyovskaya line	Bagrationovskaya	Багратионовская		1961-10-13	0 m	surface, open	55.7438°N 37.4977°E	Category:Bagrationovskaya on Wikimedia Commons
#4 Filyovskaya line	Fili	Фили		1959-11-07	0 m	surface, open	55.7460°N 37.5150°E	Category:Fili (Moscow Metro) on Wikimedia Commons
#4 Filyovskaya line	Kutuzovskaya	Кутузовская	{ }	1958-11-07	0 m	surface, open	55.7399°N 37.5344°E	Category:Kutuzovskaya (Moscow Metro) on Wikimedia Commons
#4 Filyovskaya line	Studencheskaya	Студенческая		1958-11-07	0 m	surface, open	55.7388°N 37.5483°E	Category:Studencheskaya (Moscow Metro station) on Wikimedia Commons
#4A Filyovskaya line	Moskva-City; Mezhdunarodnaya (2006–2024)	Москва-Сити; Международная (2006–2024)	{ }	2006-08-30	−25 m	column, triple-vault	55.7483°N 37.5339°E	Category:Mezhdunarodnaya (Moscow Metro) on Wikimedia Commons
#4A Filyovskaya line	Delovoy Tsentr; Delovoy Tsentr (2005–2009); Vystavochnaya (2009–2024)	Деловой центр Деловой центр (2005–2009); Выставочная (2009–2024)	Transfer for #8A Solntsevskaya line at Delovoy Tsentr Transfer for #17 Rublyovo-Arkhangelskaya line at Delovoy Tsentr	2005-09-10	−25 m	column, triple-span	55.7502°N 37.5408°E	Category:Vystavochnaya (Moscow Metro) on Wikimedia Commons
#4 Filyovskaya line #4A Filyovskaya line	Kiyevskaya	Киевская	Transfer for #3 Arbatsko-Pokrovskaya line at Kiyevskaya Transfer for #5 Koltsevaya line at Kiyevskaya	1937-03-20	−8.7 m	column, triple-span	55.7436°N 37.5655°E	Category:Kievskaya (Filyovskaya Line) on Wikimedia Commons
#4 Filyovskaya line #4A Filyovskaya line	Smolenskaya	Смоленская		1935-05-15	−8 m	column, triple-span	55.7488°N 37.5825°E	Category:Smolenskaya (Filyovskaya Line) on Wikimedia Commons
#4 Filyovskaya line #4A Filyovskaya line	Arbatskaya	Арбатская		1935-05-15	−8 m	column, triple-span	55.7518°N 37.6007°E	Category:Arbatskaya (Filyovskaya Line) on Wikimedia Commons
#4 Filyovskaya line #4A Filyovskaya line	Aleksandrovsky Sad; Ulitsa Kominterna (1935–1946); Kalininskaya (1946–1990); Vozdvizhenka (1990)	Александровский сад Улица Коминтерна (1935–1946); Калининская (1946–1990); Воздвиженка (1990)	Transfer for #1 Sokolnicheskaya line at Biblioteka Imeni Lenina Transfer for #3 Arbatsko-Pokrovskaya line at Arbatskaya Transfer for #9 Serpukhovsko-Timiryazevskaya line at Borovitskaya	1935-05-15	−7 m	column, four-span	55.7525°N 37.6085°E	Category:Alexandrovsky Sad on Wikimedia Commons
#5 Koltsevaya line	Kiyevskaya	Киевская	Transfer for #3 Arbatsko-Pokrovskaya line at Kiyevskaya Transfer for #4 Filyovskaya line at Kiyevskaya Transfer for #4A Filyovskaya line at Kiyevskaya	1954-03-14	−48 m	pylon, triple-vault	55.7446°N 37.5644°E	Category:Kievskaya-Koltsevaya on Wikimedia Commons
#5 Koltsevaya line	Krasnopresnenskaya	Краснопресненская	Transfer for #7 Tagansko-Krasnopresnenskaya line at Barrikadnaya	1954-03-14	−35.5 m	pylon, triple-vault	55.7613°N 37.5774°E	Category:Krasnopresnenskaya (Moscow Metro) on Wikimedia Commons
#5 Koltsevaya line	Belorusskaya	Белорусская	Transfer for #2 Zamoskvoretskaya line at Belorusskaya	1952-01-30	−42.5 m	pylon, triple-vault	55.7764°N 37.5844°E	Category:Belorusskaya-Koltsevaya on Wikimedia Commons
#5 Koltsevaya line	Novoslobodskaya	Новослободская	Transfer for #9 Serpukhovsko-Timiryazevskaya line at Mendeleyevskaya	1952-01-30	−40 m	pylon, triple-vault	55.7799°N 37.6028°E	Category:Novoslobodskaya (Moscow Metro) on Wikimedia Commons
#5 Koltsevaya line	Prospekt Mira; Botanichesky Sad (1952–1966)	Проспект Мира; Ботанический сад (1952–1966)	Transfer for #6 Kaluzhsko-Rizhskaya line at Prospekt Mira	1952-01-30	−40 m	pylon, triple-vault	55.7798°N 37.6318°E	Category:Prospekt Mira-Koltsevaya on Wikimedia Commons
#5 Koltsevaya line	Komsomolskaya	Комсомольская	Transfer for #1 Sokolnicheskaya line at Komsomolskaya	1952-01-30	−37 m	column, triple-vault	55.7748°N 37.6549°E	Category:Komsomolskaya-Koltsevaya on Wikimedia Commons
#5 Koltsevaya line	Kurskaya	Курская	Transfer for #3 Arbatsko-Pokrovskaya line at Kurskaya Transfer for #10 Lyublinsko-Dmitrovskaya line at Chkalovskaya	1950-01-01	−40 m	column, triple-vault	55.7570°N 37.6595°E	Category:Kurskaya-Koltsevaya on Wikimedia Commons
#5 Koltsevaya line	Taganskaya	Таганская	Transfer for #7 Tagansko-Krasnopresnenskaya line at Taganskaya Transfer for #8 Kalininskaya line at Marksistskaya	1950-01-01	−53 m	pylon, triple-vault	55.7418°N 37.6517°E	Category:Taganskaya-Koltsevaya on Wikimedia Commons
#5 Koltsevaya line	Paveletskaya	Павелецкая	Transfer for #2 Zamoskvoretskaya line at Paveletskaya	1950-01-01	−40 m	pylon, triple-vault	55.7318°N 37.6379°E	Category:Paveletskaya-Koltsevaya on Wikimedia Commons
#5 Koltsevaya line	Dobryninskaya; Serpukhovskaya (1950–1961)	Добрынинская; Серпуховская (1950–1961)	Transfer for #9 Serpukhovsko-Timiryazevskaya line at Serpukhovskaya	1950-01-01	−35.5 m	pylon, triple-vault	55.7291°N 37.6243°E	Category:Dobryninskaya on Wikimedia Commons
#5 Koltsevaya line	Oktyabrskaya; Kaluzhskaya (1950–1961)	Октябрьская; Калужская (1950–1961)	Transfer for #6 Kaluzhsko-Rizhskaya line at Oktyabrskaya	1950-01-01	−40 m	pylon, triple-vault	55.7297°N 37.6091°E	Category:Oktyabrskaya-Koltsevaya on Wikimedia Commons
#5 Koltsevaya line	Park Kultury; Park Kultury imeni Gorkogo (1950–1980)	Парк культуры Парк Культуры имени Горького (1950–1980)	Transfer for #1 Sokolnicheskaya line at Park Kultury	1950-01-01	−40 m	pylon, triple-vault	55.7357°N 37.5915°E	Category:Park Kultury-Koltsevaya on Wikimedia Commons
#6 Kaluzhsko-Rizhskaya line	Medvedkovo	Медведково		1978-09-30	−10 m	column, triple-span	55.8872°N 37.6613°E	Category:Medvedkovo (Moscow Metro) on Wikimedia Commons
#6 Kaluzhsko-Rizhskaya line	Babushkinskaya	Бабушкинская		1978-09-30	−10 m	single-vault, shallow	55.8694°N 37.6644°E	Category:Babushkinskaya (Moscow Metro) on Wikimedia Commons
#6 Kaluzhsko-Rizhskaya line	Sviblovo	Свиблово		1978-09-30	−8 m	column, triple-span	55.8552°N 37.6527°E	Category:Sviblovo (Moscow Metro) on Wikimedia Commons
#6 Kaluzhsko-Rizhskaya line	Botanichesky Sad	Ботанический сад	<>	1978-09-30	−7 m	column, triple-span	55.8449°N 37.6383°E	Category:Botanichesky Sad (Moscow Metro) on Wikimedia Commons
#6 Kaluzhsko-Rizhskaya line	VDNKh; VSKhV (1958–1959)	ВДНХ; ВСХВ (1958–1959)		1958-05-01	−53.5 m	pylon, triple-vault	55.8211°N 37.6411°E	Category:VDNKh (Moscow Metro) on Wikimedia Commons
#6 Kaluzhsko-Rizhskaya line	Alekseyevskaya; Mir (1958–1966); Scherbakovskaya (1966–1990)	Алексеевская; Мир (1958–1966); Щербаковская (1966–1990)		1958-05-01	−51 m	pylon, triple-vault	55.8088°N 37.6390°E	Category:Alexeyevskaya (Moscow Metro) on Wikimedia Commons
#6 Kaluzhsko-Rizhskaya line	Rizhskaya	Рижская	Transfer for #11 Bolshaya Koltsevaya line at Rizhskaya	1958-05-01	−46 m	pylon, triple-vault	55.7936°N 37.6362°E	Category:Rizhskaya (Kaluzhsko-Rizhskaya Line) on Wikimedia Commons
#6 Kaluzhsko-Rizhskaya line	Prospekt Mira; Botanichesky Sad (1958–1966)	Проспект Мира; Ботанический сад (1958–1966)	Transfer for #5 Koltsevaya line at Prospekt Mira	1958-05-01	−50 m	pylon, triple-vault	55.7812°N 37.6318°E	Category:Prospekt Mira-Radialnaya on Wikimedia Commons
#6 Kaluzhsko-Rizhskaya line	Sukharevskaya; Kolkhoznaya (1972–1990)	Сухаревская; Колхозная (1972–1990)		1972-01-05	−43 m	pylon, triple-vault	55.7733°N 37.6319°E	Category:Sukharevskaya (Moscow Metro) on Wikimedia Commons
#6 Kaluzhsko-Rizhskaya line	Turgenevskaya	Тургеневская	Transfer for #1 Sokolnicheskaya line at Chistye Prudy Transfer for #10 Lyublinsko-Dmitrovskaya line at Sretensky Bulvar	1972-01-05	−49 m	pylon, triple-vault	55.7661°N 37.6374°E	Category:Turgenevskaya (Moscow Metro) on Wikimedia Commons
#6 Kaluzhsko-Rizhskaya line	Kitay-gorod; Ploshchad Nogina (1971–1990)	Китай-город; Площадь Ногина (1971–1990)	[]	1971-01-03	−29 m	column, triple-vault	55.7553°N 37.6333°E	Category:Kitay-Gorod (Moscow Metro) on Wikimedia Commons
#6 Kaluzhsko-Rizhskaya line	Tretyakovskaya; Novokuznetskaya (1971–1983)	Третьяковская; Новокузнецкая (1971–1983)	[]	1971-01-03	−46 m	pylon, triple-vault	55.7412°N 37.6274°E	Category:Tretyakovskaya on Wikimedia Commons
#6 Kaluzhsko-Rizhskaya line	Oktyabrskaya	Октябрьская	Transfer for #5 Koltsevaya line at Oktyabrskaya	1962-10-13	−50 m	pylon, triple-vault	55.7306°N 37.6112°E	Category:Oktyabrskaya-Radialnaya on Wikimedia Commons
#6 Kaluzhsko-Rizhskaya line	Shabolovskaya	Шаболовская		1980-11-06	−46.5 m	pylon, triple-vault	55.7198°N 37.6083°E	Category:Shabolovskaya on Wikimedia Commons
#6 Kaluzhsko-Rizhskaya line	Leninsky Prospekt	Ленинский проспект	{ }	1962-10-13	−16 m	column, triple-span	55.7077°N 37.5861°E	Category:Leninsky Prospekt (Moscow Metro) on Wikimedia Commons
#6 Kaluzhsko-Rizhskaya line	Akademicheskaya	Академическая	Transfer for #16 Troitskaya line at Akademicheskaya	1962-10-13	−8.5 m	column, triple-span	55.6877°N 37.5733°E	Category:Akademicheskaya (Kaluzhsko-Rizhskaya Line) on Wikimedia Commons
#6 Kaluzhsko-Rizhskaya line	Profsoyuznaya	Профсоюзная		1962-10-13	−7 m	column, triple-span	55.6780°N 37.5627°E	Category:Profsoyuznaya (Moscow Metro) on Wikimedia Commons
#6 Kaluzhsko-Rizhskaya line	Novye Cheryomushki	Новые Черёмушки		1962-10-13	−7 m	column, triple-span	55.6702°N 37.5544°E	Category:Noviye Cheryomushki on Wikimedia Commons
#6 Kaluzhsko-Rizhskaya line	Kaluzhskaya	Калужская	Transfer for #11 Bolshaya Koltsevaya line at Vorontsovskaya	1974-08-12	−10 m	column, triple-span	55.6571°N 37.5405°E	Category:Kaluzhskaya (Moscow Metro) on Wikimedia Commons
#6 Kaluzhsko-Rizhskaya line	Belyayevo	Беляево		1974-08-12	−12 m	column, triple-span	55.6428°N 37.5257°E	Category:Belyayevo (Moscow Metro) on Wikimedia Commons
#6 Kaluzhsko-Rizhskaya line	Konkovo	Коньково		1987-11-06	−8 m	single-vault, shallow	55.6333°N 37.5188°E	Category:Konkovo (Moscow Metro) on Wikimedia Commons
#6 Kaluzhsko-Rizhskaya line	Tyoply Stan	Тёплый Стан		1987-11-06	−8 m	column, triple-span	55.6191°N 37.5082°E	Category:Tyoply Stan (Moscow Metro) on Wikimedia Commons
#6 Kaluzhsko-Rizhskaya line	Yasenevo	Ясенево		1990-01-17	−8 m	column, triple-span	55.6063°N 37.5333°E	Category:Yasenevo (Moscow Metro) on Wikimedia Commons
#6 Kaluzhsko-Rizhskaya line	Novoyasenevskaya; Bittsevsky Park (1990–2009)	Новоясеневская; Битцевский парк (1990–2009)	Transfer for #12 Butovskaya line at Bittsevsky Park	1990-01-17	−7 m	column, triple-span	55.6010°N 37.5541°E	Category:Novoyasenevskaya (Moscow Metro) on Wikimedia Commons
#7 Tagansko-Krasnopresnenskaya line	Planernaya	Планерная		1975-12-30	−6 m	column, triple-span	55.8607°N 37.4364°E	Category:Planernaya (Moscow Metro) on Wikimedia Commons
#7 Tagansko-Krasnopresnenskaya line	Skhodnenskaya	Сходненская		1975-12-30	−6 m	single-vault, shallow	55.8505°N 37.4396°E	Category:Skhodnenskaya (Moscow Metro) on Wikimedia Commons
#7 Tagansko-Krasnopresnenskaya line	Tushinskaya	Тушинская		1975-12-30	−10.5 m	column, triple-span	55.8267°N 37.4368°E	Category:Tushinskaya (Moscow Metro) on Wikimedia Commons
#7 Tagansko-Krasnopresnenskaya line	Spartak	Спартак		2014-08-27	−10 m	column, triple-span	55.8182°N 37.4352°E	Category:Spartak (Moscow Metro) on Wikimedia Commons
#7 Tagansko-Krasnopresnenskaya line	Shchukinskaya	Щукинская		1975-12-30	−13 m	column, triple-span	55.8086°N 37.4641°E	Category:Shchukinskaya (Moscow Metro) on Wikimedia Commons
#7 Tagansko-Krasnopresnenskaya line	Oktyabrskoye Pole	Октябрьское поле	<>	1972-12-30	-11 m	column, triple-span	55.7935°N 37.4935°E	Category:Oktyabrskoe Pole (Moscow Metro) on Wikimedia Commons
#7 Tagansko-Krasnopresnenskaya line	Polezhayevskaya	Полежаевская	<>	1972-12-30	−10 m	column, triple-span	55.7775°N 37.5192°E	Category:Polezhaevskaya on Wikimedia Commons
#7 Tagansko-Krasnopresnenskaya line	Begovaya	Беговая		1972-12-30	−9 m	column, triple-span	55.7738°N 37.5468°E	Category:Begovaya (Moscow Metro) on Wikimedia Commons
#7 Tagansko-Krasnopresnenskaya line	Ulitsa 1905 Goda	Улица 1905 года		1972-12-30	−11 m	column, triple-span	55.7650°N 37.5613°E	Category:Ulitsa 1905 Goda (metro station) on Wikimedia Commons
#7 Tagansko-Krasnopresnenskaya line	Barrikadnaya	Баррикадная	Transfer for #5 Koltsevaya line at Krasnopresnenskaya	1972-12-30	−30 m	pylon, triple-vault	55.7612°N 37.5795°E	Category:Barrikadnaya (Moscow Metro) on Wikimedia Commons
#7 Tagansko-Krasnopresnenskaya line	Pushkinskaya	Пушкинская	Transfer for #2 Zamoskvoretskaya line at Tverskaya Transfer for #9 Serpukhovsko-Timiryazevskaya line at Chekhovskaya	1975-12-17	−51 m	column, triple-vault	55.7650°N 37.6079°E	Category:Pushkinskaya (Moscow Metro) on Wikimedia Commons
#7 Tagansko-Krasnopresnenskaya line	Kuznetsky Most	Кузнецкий мост	Transfer for #1 Sokolnicheskaya line at Lubyanka	1975-12-17	−39.5 m	column, triple-vault	55.7606°N 37.6259°E	Category:Kuznetsky Most (Moscow Metro) on Wikimedia Commons
#7 Tagansko-Krasnopresnenskaya line	Kitay-gorod; Ploshchad Nogina (1971–1990)	Китай-город; Площадь Ногина (1971–1990)	[]	1971-01-03	−29 m	column, triple-vault	55.7553°N 37.6333°E	Category:Kitay-Gorod (Moscow Metro) on Wikimedia Commons
#7 Tagansko-Krasnopresnenskaya line	Taganskaya	Таганская	Transfer for #5 Koltsevaya line at Taganskaya Transfer for #8 Kalininskaya line at Marksistskaya	1966-12-31	−36 m	pylon, triple-vault	55.7402°N 37.6522°E	Category:Taganskaya-Radialnaya on Wikimedia Commons
#7 Tagansko-Krasnopresnenskaya line	Proletarskaya	Пролетарская	Transfer for #10 Lyublinsko-Dmitrovskaya line at Krestyanskaya Zastava	1966-12-31	−9 m	column, triple-span	55.7319°N 37.6659°E	Category:Proletarskaya (Moscow Metro) on Wikimedia Commons
#7 Tagansko-Krasnopresnenskaya line	Volgogradsky Prospekt	Волгоградский проспект		1966-12-31	−8 m	column, triple-span	55.7253°N 37.6869°E	Category:Volgogradsky Prospekt (Moscow Metro) on Wikimedia Commons
#7 Tagansko-Krasnopresnenskaya line	Tekstilshchiki	Текстильщики	{ }	1966-12-31	−13 m	column, triple-span	55.7088°N 37.7316°E	Category:Tekstilshchiki (Tagansko-Krasnopresnenskaya Line) on Wikimedia Commons
#7 Tagansko-Krasnopresnenskaya line	Kuzminki	Кузьминки		1966-12-31	−8 m	column, triple-span	55.7056°N 37.7656°E	Category:Kuzminki (Moscow Metro) on Wikimedia Commons
#7 Tagansko-Krasnopresnenskaya line	Ryazansky Prospekt	Рязанский проспект		1966-12-31	−6 m	column, triple-span	55.7170°N 37.7933°E	Category:Ryazansky Prospekt (Moscow Metro) on Wikimedia Commons
#7 Tagansko-Krasnopresnenskaya line	Vykhino; Zhdanovskaya (1966−1989)	Выхино; Ждановская (1966−1989)		1966-12-31	0 m	surface, open	55.7156°N 37.8181°E	Category:Vykhino (Moscow Metro) on Wikimedia Commons
#7 Tagansko-Krasnopresnenskaya line	Lermontovsky Prospekt	Лермонтовский проспект	Transfer for #15 Nekrasovskaya line at Kosino	2013-11-09	−12 m	single-vault, shallow	55.7013°N 37.8525°E	Category:Lermontovsky Prospekt (Moscow Metro) on Wikimedia Commons
#7 Tagansko-Krasnopresnenskaya line	Zhulebino	Жулебино		2013-11-09	−15 m	column, double-span	55.6855°N 37.8563°E	Category:Zhulebino (Moscow Metro) on Wikimedia Commons
#7 Tagansko-Krasnopresnenskaya line	Kotelniki	Котельники		2015-09-21	−15 m	column, double-span	55.6743°N 37.8582°E	Category:Kotelniki (Moscow Metro) on Wikimedia Commons
#8 Kalininskaya line	Tretyakovskaya; Novokuznetskaya (1971–1983)	Третьяковская; Новокузнецкая (1971–1983)	[]	1986-01-25	−46 m	pylon, triple-vault	55.7412°N 37.6274°E	Category:Tretyakovskaya on Wikimedia Commons
#8 Kalininskaya line	Marksistskaya	Марксистская	Transfer for #5 Koltsevaya line at Taganskaya Transfer for #7 Tagansko-Krasnopresnenskaya line at Taganskaya	1979-12-30	−60 m	column, triple-vault	55.7411°N 37.6543°E	Category:Marksistskaya (Moscow Metro) on Wikimedia Commons
#8 Kalininskaya line	Ploshchad Ilyicha	Площадь Ильича	Transfer for #10 Lyublinsko-Dmitrovskaya line at Rimskaya	1979-12-30	−46 m	pylon, triple-vault	55.7472°N 37.6824°E	Category:Ploshchad Ilicha on Wikimedia Commons
#8 Kalininskaya line	Aviamotornaya	Авиамоторная	<>	1979-12-30	−53 m	column, triple-vault	55.7524°N 37.7191°E	Category:Aviamotornaya (Kalininskaya Line) on Wikimedia Commons
#8 Kalininskaya line	Shosse Entuziastov	Шоссе Энтузиастов	<>	1979-12-30	−53 m	pylon, triple-vault	55.7576°N 37.7500°E	Category:Shosse Entuziastov (Moscow Metro) on Wikimedia Commons
#8 Kalininskaya line	Perovo	Перово		1979-12-30	−9 m	single-vault, shallow	55.7511°N 37.7866°E	Category:Perovo (Moscow Metro) on Wikimedia Commons
#8 Kalininskaya line	Novogireyevo	Новогиреево		1979-12-30	−9 m	column, triple-span	55.7517°N 37.8166°E	Category:Novogireyevo (Moscow Metro station) on Wikimedia Commons
#8 Kalininskaya line	Novokosino	Новокосино		2012-08-30	−9 m	single-vault, shallow	55.7451°N 37.8638°E	Category:Novokosino (Moscow Metro) on Wikimedia Commons
#8A Solntsevskaya line	Aeroport Vnukovo	Аэропорт Внуково		2023-09-06	0 m	column, double-span		Category:Aeroport Vnukovo (Moscow Metro) on Wikimedia Commons
#8A Solntsevskaya line	Pykhtino	Пыхтино		2023-09-06	0 m	surface, open (semi-underground)		Category:Pykhtino (Moscow Metro) on Wikimedia Commons
#8A Solntsevskaya line	Rasskazovka	Рассказовка		2018-08-30	−12 m	column, double-span	55.6339°N 37.3347°E	Category:Rasskazovka metro station on Wikimedia Commons
#8A Solntsevskaya line	Novoperedelkino	Новопеределкино		2018-08-30	−16 m	column, double-span	55.6396°N 37.3552°E	Category:Novoperedelkino metro station on Wikimedia Commons
#8A Solntsevskaya line	Borovskoye Shosse	Боровское Шоссе		2018-08-30	−20 m	column, double-span	55.6476°N 37.3701°E	Category:Borovskoye Shosse metro station on Wikimedia Commons
#8A Solntsevskaya line	Solntsevo	Солнцево		2018-08-30	−13 m	column, double-span	55.6493°N 37.3909°E	Category:Solntsevo metro station on Wikimedia Commons
#8A Solntsevskaya line	Govorovo	Говорово		2018-08-30	−14 m	column, double-span	55.6595°N 37.4172°E	Category:Govorovo metro station on Wikimedia Commons
#8A Solntsevskaya line	Ozyornaya	Озёрная		2018-08-30	−25 m	column, double-span	55.6709°N 37.4491°E	Category:Ozyornaya metro station on Wikimedia Commons
#8A Solntsevskaya line	Michurinsky Prospekt	Мичуринский проспект	Transfer for #11 Bolshaya Koltsevaya line at Michurinsky Prospekt	2018-08-30	−13 m	column, triple-span	55.6896°N 37.4833°E	Category:Michurinsky Prospekt (Kalininsko-Solntsevskaya Line) on Wikimedia Commons
#8A Solntsevskaya line	Ramenki	Раменки		2017-03-16	−15 m	column, double-span	55.6975°N 37.4984°E	Category:Ramenki (Moscow Metro) on Wikimedia Commons
#8A Solntsevskaya line	Lomonosovsky Prospekt	Ломоносовский проспект		2017-03-16	−15 m	column, double-span	55.7069°N 37.5156°E	Category:Lomonosovsky Prospekt (Moscow Metro) on Wikimedia Commons
#8A Solntsevskaya line	Minskaya	Минская		2017-03-16	−15 m	column, double-span	55.7246°N 37.4970°E	Category:Minskaya (Moscow Metro) on Wikimedia Commons
#8A Solntsevskaya line	Park Pobedy	Парк Победы	[]	2003-05-06	−73.6 m	pylon, triple-vault	55.7362°N 37.5182°E	Category:Park Pobedy (Moscow Metro) on Wikimedia Commons
#8A Solntsevskaya line	Delovoy Tsentr	Деловой центр	Transfer for #4A Filyovskaya line at Delovoy Tsentr Transfer for #17 Rublyovo-Arkhangelskaya line at Delovoy Tsentr	2014-01-31	−30 m	column, triple-span	55.7475°N 37.5319°E	Category:Delovoy Tsentr (Moscow Metro, Kalininsko-Solntsevskaya Line) on Wikimedia Commons
#9 Serpukhovsko-Timiryazevskaya line	Altufyevo	Алтуфьево		1994-07-15	−9 m	single-vault, shallow	55.8980°N 37.5870°E	Category:Altufyevo (Moscow Metro) on Wikimedia Commons
#9 Serpukhovsko-Timiryazevskaya line	Bibirevo	Бибирево		1992-12-31	−9.5 m	column, triple-span	55.8838°N 37.6034°E	Category:Bibirevo (Moscow Metro) on Wikimedia Commons
#9 Serpukhovsko-Timiryazevskaya line	Otradnoye	Отрадное		1991-03-01	−9 m	single-vault, shallow	55.8633°N 37.6047°E	Category:Otradnoye (Moscow Metro) on Wikimedia Commons
#9 Serpukhovsko-Timiryazevskaya line	Vladykino	Владыкино	{ }	1991-03-01	−10.5 m	column, triple-span	55.8473°N 37.5899°E	Category:Vladykino (Moscow Metro) on Wikimedia Commons
#9 Serpukhovsko-Timiryazevskaya line	Petrovsko-Razumovskaya	Петровско-Разумовская	[]	1991-03-01	−61 m	column, triple-vault	55.8351°N 37.5745°E	Category:Petrovsko-Razumovskaya (Moscow Metro) on Wikimedia Commons
#9 Serpukhovsko-Timiryazevskaya line	Timiryazevskaya	Тимирязевская		1991-03-01	−63.5 m	single-vault, deep	55.8176°N 37.5765°E	Category:Timiryazevskaya (Moscow Metro) on Wikimedia Commons
#9 Serpukhovsko-Timiryazevskaya line	Dmitrovskaya	Дмитровская		1991-03-01	−59 m	pylon, triple-vault	55.8069°N 37.5817°E	Category:Dmitrovskaya (Moscow Metro) on Wikimedia Commons
#9 Serpukhovsko-Timiryazevskaya line	Savyolovskaya	Савёловская	Transfer for #11 Bolshaya Koltsevaya line at Savyolovskaya	1988-12-31	−52 m	pylon, triple-vault	55.7927°N 37.5885°E	Category:Savyolovskaya (Serpukhovsko-Timiryazevskaya Line) on Wikimedia Commons
#9 Serpukhovsko-Timiryazevskaya line	Mendeleyevskaya	Менделеевская	Transfer for #5 Koltsevaya line at Novoslobodskaya	1988-12-31	−48.5 m	column, triple-vault	55.7810°N 37.6011°E	Category:Mendeleevskaya (Moscow Metro) on Wikimedia Commons
#9 Serpukhovsko-Timiryazevskaya line	Tsvetnoy Bulvar	Цветной бульвар	Transfer for #10 Lyublinsko-Dmitrovskaya line at Trubnaya	1988-12-31	−50 m	pylon, triple-vault	55.7708°N 37.6187°E	Category:Tsvetnoy Bulvar (Moscow Metro) on Wikimedia Commons
#9 Serpukhovsko-Timiryazevskaya line	Chekhovskaya	Чеховская	Transfer for #2 Zamoskvoretskaya line at Tverskaya Transfer for #7 Tagansko-Krasnopresnenskaya line at Pushkinskaya	1987-12-31	−62 m	pylon, triple-vault	55.7644°N 37.6097°E	Category:Chekhovskaya (Moscow Metro) on Wikimedia Commons
#9 Serpukhovsko-Timiryazevskaya line	Borovitskaya	Боровицкая	Transfer for #1 Sokolnicheskaya line at Biblioteka Imeni Lenina Transfer for #3 Arbatsko-Pokrovskaya line at Arbatskaya Transfer for #4 Filyovskaya line at Aleksandrovsky Sad Transfer for #4A Filyovskaya line at Aleksandrovsky Sad	1986-01-23	−46.5 m	pylon, triple-vault	55.7511°N 37.6072°E	Category:Borovitskaya (Moscow Metro) on Wikimedia Commons
#9 Serpukhovsko-Timiryazevskaya line	Polyanka	Полянка		1986-01-23	−36.5 m	column, triple-vault	55.7379°N 37.6180°E	Category:Polyanka (Moscow Metro) on Wikimedia Commons
#9 Serpukhovsko-Timiryazevskaya line	Serpukhovskaya	Серпуховская	Transfer for #5 Koltsevaya line at Dobryninskaya	1983-11-08	−43 m	pylon, triple-vault	55.7280°N 37.6246°E	Category:Serpukhovskaya (Moscow Metro) on Wikimedia Commons
#9 Serpukhovsko-Timiryazevskaya line	Tulskaya	Тульская		1983-11-08	−9.5 m	single-vault, shallow	55.7087°N 37.6229°E	Category:Tulskaya (Moscow Metro) on Wikimedia Commons
#9 Serpukhovsko-Timiryazevskaya line	Nagatinskaya	Нагатинская		1983-11-08	−13.5 m	column, triple-span	55.6830°N 37.6224°E	Category:Nagatinskaya (Moscow Metro) on Wikimedia Commons
#9 Serpukhovsko-Timiryazevskaya line	Nagornaya	Нагорная		1983-11-08	−9 m	column, triple-span	55.6724°N 37.6104°E	Category:Nagornaya (Moscow Metro) on Wikimedia Commons
#9 Serpukhovsko-Timiryazevskaya line	Nakhimovsky Prospekt	Нахимовский проспект		1983-11-08	−9.5 m	single-vault, shallow	55.6627°N 37.6055°E	Category:Nakhimovsky Prospekt (Moscow Metro) on Wikimedia Commons
#9 Serpukhovsko-Timiryazevskaya line	Sevastopolskaya	Севастопольская	Transfer for #11 Bolshaya Koltsevaya line at Kakhovskaya	1983-11-08	−13 m	column, triple-span	55.6524°N 37.5984°E	Category:Sevastopolskaya (Moscow Metro) on Wikimedia Commons
#9 Serpukhovsko-Timiryazevskaya line	Chertanovskaya	Чертановская		1983-11-08	−10.5 m	column, triple-span	55.6405°N 37.6067°E	Category:Chertanovskaya (Moscow Metro) on Wikimedia Commons
#9 Serpukhovsko-Timiryazevskaya line	Yuzhnaya	Южная		1983-11-08	−10 m	single-vault, shallow	55.6224°N 37.6090°E	Category:Yuzhnaya (Moscow Metro) on Wikimedia Commons
#9 Serpukhovsko-Timiryazevskaya line	Prazhskaya	Пражская		1985-11-06	−9.5 m	column, triple-span	55.6124°N 37.6044°E	Category:Prazhskaya (Moscow Metro) on Wikimedia Commons
#9 Serpukhovsko-Timiryazevskaya line	Ulitsa Akademika Yangelya	Улица Академика Янгеля		2000-08-31	−8 m	single-vault, shallow	55.5949°N 37.6004°E	Category:Ulitsa Akademika Yangelya (Moscow Metro) on Wikimedia Commons
#9 Serpukhovsko-Timiryazevskaya line	Annino	Аннино		2001-12-12	−8 m	single-vault, shallow	55.5828°N 37.5966°E	Category:Annino (Moscow Metro) on Wikimedia Commons
#9 Serpukhovsko-Timiryazevskaya line	Bulvar Dmitriya Donskogo	Бульвар Дмитрия Донского	Transfer for #12 Butovskaya line at Ulitsa Starokachalovskaya	2002-12-26	−10 m	column, triple-span	55.5693°N 37.5769°E	Category:Bulvar Dmitriya Donskogo (Moscow Metro) on Wikimedia Commons
#10 Lyublinsko-Dmitrovskaya line	Fiztekh	Физтех		2023-09-07	>-25 m	column, triple-span		Category:Fiztekh (Moscow Metro) on Wikimedia Commons
#10 Lyublinsko-Dmitrovskaya line	Lianozovo	Лианозово		2023-09-07	>-25 m	column, triple-span		Category:Lianozovo (Moscow Metro) on Wikimedia Commons
#10 Lyublinsko-Dmitrovskaya line	Yakhromskaya	Яхромская		2023-09-07	>-25 m	column, triple-span		Category:Yakhromskaya (Moscow Metro) on Wikimedia Commons
#10 Lyublinsko-Dmitrovskaya line	Seligerskaya	Селигерская		2018-03-22	−20 m	column, triple-span	55.865000°N 37.548333°E	Category:Seligerskaya (Moscow Metro) on Wikimedia Commons
#10 Lyublinsko-Dmitrovskaya line	Verkhniye Likhobory	Верхние Лихоборы		2018-03-22	−65 m	pylon, triple-vault	55.855833°N 37.561111°E	Category:Verkhnie Likhobory (Moscow Metro) on Wikimedia Commons
#10 Lyublinsko-Dmitrovskaya line	Okruzhnaya	Окружная	<>	2018-03-22	−65 m	pylon, triple-vault	55.846000°N 37.574250°E	Category:Okruzhnaya (Moscow Metro) on Wikimedia Commons
#10 Lyublinsko-Dmitrovskaya line	Petrovsko-Razumovskaya	Петровско-Разумовская	[]	1991-03-01	−61 m	column, triple-vault	55.8351°N 37.5745°E	Category:Petrovsko-Razumovskaya (Moscow Metro) on Wikimedia Commons
#10 Lyublinsko-Dmitrovskaya line	Fonvizinskaya	Фонвизинская		2016-09-16	−65 m	pylon, triple-vault	55.8228°N 37.5881°E	Category:Fonvizinskaya on Wikimedia Commons
#10 Lyublinsko-Dmitrovskaya line	Butyrskaya	Бутырская		2016-09-16	−60 m	pylon, triple-vault	55.8133°N 37.6028°E	Category:Butyrskaya (Moscow Metro) on Wikimedia Commons
#10 Lyublinsko-Dmitrovskaya line	Maryina Roshcha	Марьина Роща	Transfer for #11 Bolshaya Koltsevaya line at Maryina Roshcha	2010-06-19	−60 m	pylon, triple-vault	55.7954°N 37.6162°E	Category:Maryina Roshcha (Lyublinsko-Dmitrovskaya Line) on Wikimedia Commons
#10 Lyublinsko-Dmitrovskaya line	Dostoyevskaya	Достоевская		2010-06-19	−60 m	column, triple-vault	55.7816°N 37.6151°E	Category:Dostoevskaya on Wikimedia Commons
#10 Lyublinsko-Dmitrovskaya line	Trubnaya	Трубная	Transfer for #9 Serpukhovsko-Timiryazevskaya line at Tsvetnoy Bulvar	2007-08-30	−60 m	column, triple-vault	55.7688°N 37.6200°E	Category:Trubnaya (Moscow Metro) on Wikimedia Commons
#10 Lyublinsko-Dmitrovskaya line	Sretensky Bulvar	Сретенский бульвар	Transfer for #1 Sokolnicheskaya line at Chistye Prudy Transfer for #6 Kaluzhsko-Rizhskaya line at Turgenevskaya	2007-12-29	−60 m	pylon, triple-vault	55.7668°N 37.6392°E	Category:Sretensky Bulvar (Moscow Metro) on Wikimedia Commons
#10 Lyublinsko-Dmitrovskaya line	Chkalovskaya	Чкаловская	Transfer for #3 Arbatsko-Pokrovskaya line at Kurskaya Transfer for #5 Koltsevaya line at Kurskaya	1995-12-28	−51 m	pylon, triple-vault	55.7565°N 37.6573°E	Category:Chkalovskaya (Moscow Metro) on Wikimedia Commons
#10 Lyublinsko-Dmitrovskaya line	Rimskaya	Римская	Transfer for #8 Kalininskaya line at Ploshchad Ilyicha	1995-12-28	−54 m	column, triple-vault	55.7463°N 37.6819°E	Category:Rimskaya on Wikimedia Commons
#10 Lyublinsko-Dmitrovskaya line	Krestyanskaya Zastava	Крестьянская застава	Transfer for #7 Tagansko-Krasnopresnenskaya line at Proletarskaya	1995-12-28	−47 m	column, triple-vault	55.7331°N 37.6673°E	Category:Krestyanskaya Zastava (Moscow Metro) on Wikimedia Commons
#10 Lyublinsko-Dmitrovskaya line	Dubrovka	Дубровка	<>	1999-12-11	−62 m	column, triple-vault	55.7186°N 37.6760°E	Category:Dubrovka (Moscow Metro) on Wikimedia Commons
#10 Lyublinsko-Dmitrovskaya line	Kozhukhovskaya	Кожуховская	<>	1995-12-28	−12 m	single-vault, shallow	55.7074°N 37.6851°E	Category:Kozhukhovskaya (Moscow Metro) on Wikimedia Commons
#10 Lyublinsko-Dmitrovskaya line	Pechatniki	Печатники	Transfer for #11 Bolshaya Koltsevaya line at Pechatniki	1995-12-28	−4 m	column, triple-span	55.6934°N 37.7270°E	Category:Pechatniki (Lyublinsko-Dmitrovskaya Line) on Wikimedia Commons
#10 Lyublinsko-Dmitrovskaya line	Volzhskaya	Волжская		1995-12-28	−8 m	single-span	55.6909°N 37.7530°E	Category:Volzhskaya (Moscow Metro) on Wikimedia Commons
#10 Lyublinsko-Dmitrovskaya line	Lyublino	Люблино		1996-12-25	−8 m	single-vault, shallow	55.6758°N 37.7618°E	Category:Lyublino (Moscow Metro) on Wikimedia Commons
#10 Lyublinsko-Dmitrovskaya line	Bratislavskaya	Братиславская		1996-12-25	−8 m	column, double-span	55.6597°N 37.7505°E	Category:Bratislavskaya (Moscow Metro) on Wikimedia Commons
#10 Lyublinsko-Dmitrovskaya line	Maryino	Марьино		1996-12-25	−8 m	single-span	55.6500°N 37.7431°E	Category:Maryino (Moscow Metro) on Wikimedia Commons
#10 Lyublinsko-Dmitrovskaya line	Borisovo	Борисово		2011-12-02	−10 m	single-vault, shallow	55.6334°N 37.7436°E	Category:Borisovo (Moscow Metro) on Wikimedia Commons
#10 Lyublinsko-Dmitrovskaya line	Shipilovskaya	Шипиловская		2011-12-02	−10 m	single-vault, shallow	55.6211°N 37.7437°E	Category:Shipilovskaya (Moscow Metro) on Wikimedia Commons
#10 Lyublinsko-Dmitrovskaya line	Zyablikovo	Зябликово	Transfer for #2 Zamoskvoretskaya line at Krasnogvardeyskaya	2011-12-02	−15 m	single-vault, shallow	55.6124°N 37.7453°E	Category:Zyablikovo (Moscow Metro) on Wikimedia Commons
#11 Bolshaya Koltsevaya line	Maryina Roshcha	Марьина Роща	Transfer for #10 Lyublinsko-Dmitrovskaya line at Maryina Roshcha	2023-03-01				Category:Maryina Roshcha (Bolshaya Koltsevaya Line) on Wikimedia Commons
#11 Bolshaya Koltsevaya line	Rizhskaya	Рижская	Transfer for #6 Kaluzhsko-Rizhskaya line at Rizhskaya	2023-03-01				Category:Rizhskaya (Bolshaya Koltsevaya Line) on Wikimedia Commons
#11 Bolshaya Koltsevaya line	Sokolniki	Сокольники	Transfer for #1 Sokolnicheskaya line at Sokolniki	2023-03-01	−34 m		55.7903°N 37.679°E	Category:Sokolniki (Bolshaya Koltsevaya Line) on Wikimedia Commons
#11 Bolshaya Koltsevaya line	Elektrozavodskaya	Электрозаводская	<>	2020-12-31	−20 m	column, triple-span	55.780292°N 37.703013°E	Category:Elektrozavodskaya (Bolshaya Koltsevaya Line) on Wikimedia Commons
#11 Bolshaya Koltsevaya line	Lefortovo	Лефортово		2020-03-27	−23 m	column, double-span	55.764738°N 37.706747°E	Category:Lefortovo (Moscow Metro) on Wikimedia Commons
#11 Bolshaya Koltsevaya line	Aviamotornaya	Авиамоторная	<>	2020-03-27		column, triple-span	55.753670°N 37.719149°E	Category:Aviamotornaya (Bolshaya Koltsevaya Line) on Wikimedia Commons
#11 Bolshaya Koltsevaya line	Nizhegorodskaya	Нижегородская	[ ] { }	2020-03-27	−22 m	column, triple-span	55.731748°N 37.730076°E	Category:Nizhegorodskaya (Moscow Metro) on Wikimedia Commons
#11 Bolshaya Koltsevaya line	Tekstilshchiki	Текстильщики	{ }	2023-03-01	−22 m		55.707°N 37.7284°E	Category:Tekstilshchiki (Bolshaya Koltsevaya Line) on Wikimedia Commons
#11 Bolshaya Koltsevaya line	Pechatniki	Печатники	Transfer for #10 Lyublinsko-Dmitrovskaya line at Pechatniki	2023-03-01			55.694°N 37.727°E	Category:Pechatniki (Bolshaya Koltsevaya Line) on Wikimedia Commons
#11 Bolshaya Koltsevaya line	Nagatinsky Zaton	Нагатинский затон		2023-03-01			55.6845°N 37.7050°E	Category:Nagatinsky Zaton (Moscow Metro) on Wikimedia Commons
#11 Bolshaya Koltsevaya line	Klenovy Bulvar	Кленовый бульвар		2023-03-01			55.6755°N 37.6846°E	Category:Klenovy Bulvar (Moscow Metro) on Wikimedia Commons
#11 Bolshaya Koltsevaya line	Kashirskaya	Каширская	Transfer for #2 Zamoskvoretskaya line at Kashirskaya	1969-08-11	−7 m	column, triple-span	55.6551°N 37.6487°E	Category:Kashirskaya (Moscow Metro) on Wikimedia Commons
#11 Bolshaya Koltsevaya line	Varshavskaya	Варшавская		1969-08-11	−9 m	column, double-span	55.6533°N 37.6194°E	Category:Varshavskaya (Moscow Metro) on Wikimedia Commons
#11 Bolshaya Koltsevaya line	Kakhovskaya	Каховская	Transfer for #9 Serpukhovsko-Timiryazevskaya line at Sevastopolskaya	1969-08-11	−8 m	column, triple-span	55.6530°N 37.5983°E	Category:Kakhovskaya (Moscow Metro) on Wikimedia Commons
#11 Bolshaya Koltsevaya line	Zyuzino	Зюзино		2021-12-07	−17 m	column, double-span	55.6563°N 37.5721°E	Category:Zyuzino (Moscow Metro) on Wikimedia Commons
#11 Bolshaya Koltsevaya line	Vorontsovskaya	Воронцовская	Transfer for #6 Kaluzhsko-Rizhskaya line at Kaluzhskaya	2021-12-07	−23 m	column, triple-span	55.6587°N 37.5399°E	Category:Vorontsovskaya (Moscow Metro) on Wikimedia Commons
#11 Bolshaya Koltsevaya line	Novatorskaya	Новаторская	Transfer for #16 Troitskaya line at Novatorskaya	2021-12-07	−11 m	column, double-span	55.6701°N 37.5218°E	Category:Novatorskaya (Moscow Metro) on Wikimedia Commons
#11 Bolshaya Koltsevaya line	Prospekt Vernadskogo	Проспект Вернадского	Transfer for #1 Sokolnicheskaya line at Prospekt Vernadskogo	2021-12-07	−16 m	column, triple-span	55.6778°N 37.5050°E	Category:Prospekt Vernadskogo (Bolshaya Koltsevaya line) on Wikimedia Commons
#11 Bolshaya Koltsevaya line	Michurinsky Prospekt	Мичуринский проспект	Transfer for #8A Solntsevskaya line at Michurinsky Prospekt	2021-12-07	−19 m	column, triple-span	55.6884°N 37.4851°E	Category:Michurinsky Prospekt (Bolshaya Koltsevaya Line) on Wikimedia Commons
#11 Bolshaya Koltsevaya line	Aminyevskaya	Аминьевская		2021-12-07	−33 m	column, triple-span	55.6972°N 37.4642°E	Category:Aminyevskaya (Moscow Metro) on Wikimedia Commons
#11 Bolshaya Koltsevaya line	Davydkovo	Давыдково		2021-12-07	−33 m	column, double-span	55.7153°N 37.4517°E	Category:Davydkovo (Moscow Metro) on Wikimedia Commons
#11 Bolshaya Koltsevaya line	Kuntsevskaya	Кунцевская	Transfer for #3 Arbatsko-Pokrovskaya line at Kuntsevskaya Transfer for #4 Filyovskaya line at Kuntsevskaya	2021-12-07	−31 m	column, triple-span	55.7304°N 37.4457°E	Category:Kuntsevskaya (Bolshaya Koltsevaya line) on Wikimedia Commons
#11 Bolshaya Koltsevaya line	Terekhovo	Терехово		2021-12-07	−22 m	column, triple-span	55.7492°N 37.4606°E	Category:Terekhovo (Moscow Metro) on Wikimedia Commons
#11 Bolshaya Koltsevaya line	Mnyovniki	Мнёвники		2021-04-01	−28 m	column, triple-span	55.7585°N 37.4708°E	Category:Mnyovniki (Moscow Metro) on Wikimedia Commons
#11 Bolshaya Koltsevaya line	Narodnoye Opolcheniye	Народное Ополчение	Transfer for #17 Rublyovo-Arkhangelskaya line at Narodnoye Opolcheniye	2021-04-01	−27 m	column, triple-span	55.7738°N 37.4844°E	Category:Narodnoye Opolcheniye (Moscow Metro) on Wikimedia Commons
#11 Bolshaya Koltsevaya line	Khoroshyovskaya	Хорошёвская	<>	2018-02-26	−21 m	column, triple-span	55.7768°N 37.5207°E	Category:Khoroshyovskaya (Moscow Metro) on Wikimedia Commons
#11 Bolshaya Koltsevaya line	CSKA	ЦСКА		2018-02-26	−28 m	column, triple-span	55.7866°N 37.5333°E	Category:CSKA (Moscow Metro) on Wikimedia Commons
#11 Bolshaya Koltsevaya line	Petrovsky Park	Петровский парк	Transfer for #2 Zamoskvoretskaya line at Dinamo	2018-02-26	−25 m	column, triple-span	55.7918°N 37.5571°E	Category:Petrovsky Park (Moscow Metro) on Wikimedia Commons
#11 Bolshaya Koltsevaya line	Savyolovskaya	Савёловская	Transfer for #9 Serpukhovsko-Timiryazevskaya line at Savyolovskaya	2018-12-30	−65 m	pylon, triple-vault	55.7936°N 37.5880°E	Category:Savyolovskaya (Bolshaya Koltsevaya line) on Wikimedia Commons
#12 Butovskaya line	Bittsevsky Park	Битцевский парк	Transfer for #6 Kaluzhsko-Rizhskaya line at Novoyasenevskaya	2014-02-27	−10 m	single-vault, shallow	55.6004°N 37.5562°E	Category:Bittsevsky Park (Moscow Metro) on Wikimedia Commons
#12 Butovskaya line	Lesoparkovaya	Лесопарковая		2014-02-27	−10 m	single-vault, shallow	55.5821°N 37.5769°E	Category:Lesoparkovaya (Moscow Metro) on Wikimedia Commons
#12 Butovskaya line	Ulitsa Starokachalovskaya	Улица Старокачаловская	Transfer for #9 Serpukhovsko-Timiryazevskaya line at Bulvar Dmitriya Donskogo	2003-12-27	−10 m	single-span, two halls	55.5690°N 37.5767°E	Category:Ulitsa Starokachalovskaya (Moscow Metro) on Wikimedia Commons
#12 Butovskaya line	Ulitsa Skobelevskaya	Улица Скобелевская		2003-12-27	+9.6 m	elevated, open	55.5481°N 37.5546°E	Category:Ulitsa Skobelevskaya (Moscow Metro) on Wikimedia Commons
#12 Butovskaya line	Bulvar Admirala Ushakova	Бульвар Адмирала Ушакова		2003-12-27	+9.6 m	elevated, open	55.5455°N 37.5430°E	Category:Bulvar Admirala Ushakova (Moscow Metro) on Wikimedia Commons
#12 Butovskaya line	Ulitsa Gorchakova	Улица Горчакова		2003-12-27	+9.6 m	elevated, open	55.5418°N 37.5308°E	Category:Ulitsa Gorchakova on Wikimedia Commons
#12 Butovskaya line	Buninskaya Alleya	Бунинская аллея		2003-12-27	+9.6 m	elevated, open	55.5380°N 37.5158°E	Category:Buninskaya Alleya (Moscow Metro) on Wikimedia Commons
#14 Moscow Central Circle	Okruzhnaya	Окружная	<>	2016-09-10	0 m	surface	55.8472°N 37.5694°E	Category:Okruzhnaya (Moscow Central Circle) on Wikimedia Commons
#14 Moscow Central Circle	Vladykino	Владыкино	{ }	2016-09-10	0 m	surface	55.8476°N 37.5930°E	Category:Vladykino (Moscow Central Circle) on Wikimedia Commons
#14 Moscow Central Circle	Botanichesky Sad	Ботанический сад	<>	2016-09-10	0 m	surface	55.8460°N 37.6413°E	Category:Botanichesky Sad (Moscow Central Circle) on Wikimedia Commons
#14 Moscow Central Circle	Rostokino	Ростокино		2016-09-10	0 m	surface	55.8400°N 37.6653°E	Category:Rostokino (Moscow Central Circle) on Wikimedia Commons
#14 Moscow Central Circle	Belokamennaya	Белокаменная		2016-09-10	0 m	surface	55.8300°N 37.7006°E	Category:Belokamennaya (Moscow Central Circle) on Wikimedia Commons
#14 Moscow Central Circle	Bulvar Rokossovskogo	Бульвар Рокоссовского	<>	2016-09-10	0 m	surface	55.8172°N 37.7369°E	Category:Bulvar Rokossovskogo (Moscow Central Circle) on Wikimedia Commons
#14 Moscow Central Circle	Lokomotiv	Локомотив	{ }	2016-09-10	0 m	surface	55.8039°N 37.7460°E	Category:Lokomotiv (Moscow Central Circle) on Wikimedia Commons
#14 Moscow Central Circle	Izmaylovo	Измайлово	<>	2016-09-10	0 m	surface	55.7886°N 37.7428°E	Category:Izmaylovo (Moscow Central Circle) on Wikimedia Commons
#14 Moscow Central Circle	Sokolinaya Gora	Соколиная Гора		2016-10-11	0 m	surface	55.7714°N 37.7451°E	Category:Sokolinaya Gora (Moscow Central Circle) on Wikimedia Commons
#14 Moscow Central Circle	Shosse Entuziastov	Шоссе Энтузиастов	<>	2016-09-10	0 m	surface	55.7590°N 37.7463°E	Category:Shosse Entuziastov (Moscow Central Circle) on Wikimedia Commons
#14 Moscow Central Circle	Andronovka	Андроновка		2016-09-10	0 m	surface	55.7411°N 37.7344°E	Category:Andronovka (Moscow Central Circle) on Wikimedia Commons
#14 Moscow Central Circle	Nizhegorodskaya	Нижегородская	{ }	2016-09-10	+5 m	elevated	55.7322°N 37.7282°E	Category:Nizhegorodskaya (Moscow Central Circle) on Wikimedia Commons
#14 Moscow Central Circle	Novokhokhlovskaya	Новохохловская		2016-09-10	0 m	surface	55.7239°N 37.7161°E	Category:Novokhokhlovskaya (Moscow Central Circle) on Wikimedia Commons
#14 Moscow Central Circle	Ugreshskaya	Угрешская	<>	2016-09-10	0 m	surface	55.7183°N 37.6978°E	Category:Ugreshskaya (Moscow Central Circle) on Wikimedia Commons
#14 Moscow Central Circle	Dubrovka	Дубровка	<>	2016-10-11	0 m	surface	55.7183°N 37.6978°E	Category:Dubrovka (Moscow Central Circle) on Wikimedia Commons
#14 Moscow Central Circle	Avtozavodskaya	Автозаводская	<>	2016-09-10	0 m	surface	55.7063°N 37.6631°E	Category:Avtozavodskaya (Moscow Central Circle) on Wikimedia Commons
#14 Moscow Central Circle	ZIL	ЗИЛ	<>	2016-09-10	0 m	surface	55.6983°N 37.6483°E	Category:ZIL (Moscow Central Circle) on Wikimedia Commons
#14 Moscow Central Circle	Verkhniye Kotly	Верхние Котлы	<>	2016-09-10	0 m	surface	55.6900°N 37.6189°E	Category:Verkhniye Kotly (Moscow Central Circle) on Wikimedia Commons
#14 Moscow Central Circle	Krymskaya	Крымская	<>	2016-09-10	0 m	surface	55.6900°N 37.6050°E	Category:Krymskaya (Moscow Central Circle) on Wikimedia Commons
#14 Moscow Central Circle	Ploshchad Gagarina	Площадь Гагарина	{ }	2016-09-10	-5 m	underground	55.7069°N 37.5858°E	Category:Ploshchad Gagarina (Moscow Central Circle) on Wikimedia Commons
#14 Moscow Central Circle	Luzhniki	Лужники	<>	2016-09-10	+5 m	surface	55.7203°N 37.5631°E	Category:Luzhniki (Moscow Central Circle) on Wikimedia Commons
#14 Moscow Central Circle	Kutuzovskaya	Кутузовская	Transfer for #4 Filyovskaya line at Kutuzovskaya	2016-09-10	0 m	surface	55.7408°N 37.5333°E	Category:Kutuzovskaya (Moscow Central Circle) on Wikimedia Commons
#14 Moscow Central Circle	Moskva-City Delovoy Tsentr (2016-2024)	Москва-Сити Деловой центр (2016-2024)	Transfer for #4A Filyovskaya line at Moskva-City	2016-09-10	+7 m	elevated	55.7472°N 37.5322°E	Category:Delovoy Tsentr (Moscow Central Circle) on Wikimedia Commons
#14 Moscow Central Circle	Shelepikha	Шелепиха	{ }	2016-09-10	+5 m	elevated	55.7575°N 37.5256°E	Category:Shelepikha (Moscow Central Circle) on Wikimedia Commons
#14 Moscow Central Circle	Khoroshyovo	Хорошёво	< >	2016-09-10	0 m	surface	55.7772°N 37.5072°E	Category:Khoroshyovo (Moscow Central Circle) on Wikimedia Commons
#14 Moscow Central Circle	Zorge	Зорге	<>	2016-11-04	0 m	surface	55.7878°N 37.5045°E	Category:Zorge (Moscow Central Circle) on Wikimedia Commons
#14 Moscow Central Circle	Panfilovskaya	Панфиловская	<>	2016-11-08	0 m	surface	55.7991°N 37.4988°E	Category:Panfilovskaya (Moscow Central Circle) on Wikimedia Commons
#14 Moscow Central Circle	Streshnevo	Стрешнево	<>	2016-09-10	0 m	surface	55.8136°N 37.4869°E	Category:Streshnevo (Moscow Central Circle) on Wikimedia Commons
#14 Moscow Central Circle	Baltiyskaya	Балтийская	<>	2016-09-10	0 m	surface	55.8258°N 37.4961°E	Category:Baltiyskaya (Moscow Central Circle) on Wikimedia Commons
#14 Moscow Central Circle	Koptevo	Коптево		2016-11-01	0 m	surface	55.8397°N 37.5203°E	Category:Koptevo (Moscow Central Circle) on Wikimedia Commons
#14 Moscow Central Circle	Likhobory	Лихоборы		2016-09-10	0 m	surface	55.8472°N 37.5513°E	Category:Likhobory (Moscow Central Circle) on Wikimedia Commons
#15 Nekrasovskaya line	Nizhegorodskaya	Нижегородская	[ ]{ }	2020-03-27	−22 m	column, triple-span	55.731748°N 37.730076°E	Category:Nizhegorodskaya (Moscow Metro) on Wikimedia Commons
#15 Nekrasovskaya line	Stakhanovskaya	Стахановская		2020-03-27		column, triple-span	55.7250°N 37.7619°E	Category:Stakhanovskaya (Moscow Metro) on Wikimedia Commons
#15 Nekrasovskaya line	Okskaya	Окская		2020-03-27	−20 m	column, triple-span	55.7186°N 37.7817°E	Category:Okskaya (Moscow Metro) on Wikimedia Commons
#15 Nekrasovskaya line	Yugo-Vostochnaya	Юго-Восточная		2020-03-27	−20 m	column, triple-span	55.704970°N 37.819010°E	Category:Yugo-Vostochnaya (Moscow Metro) on Wikimedia Commons
#15 Nekrasovskaya line	Kosino	Косино	Transfer for #7 Tagansko-Krasnopresnenskaya line at Lermontovsky Prospekt	2019-06-03	−27 m	column, triple-span	55.7033°N 37.8511°E	Category:Kosino (Moscow Metro) on Wikimedia Commons
#15 Nekrasovskaya line	Ulitsa Dmitriyevskogo	Улица Дмитриевского		2019-06-03	−18 m	column, double-span	55.7100°N 37.8792°E	Category:Ulitsa Dmitriyevskogo (Moscow Metro) on Wikimedia Commons
#15 Nekrasovskaya line	Lukhmanovskaya	Лухмановская		2019-06-03	−15 m	column, triple-span	55.7085°N 37.9004°E	Category:Lukhmanovskaya (Moscow Metro) on Wikimedia Commons
#15 Nekrasovskaya line	Nekrasovka	Некрасовка		2019-06-03	−16 m	column, double-span	55.7036°N 37.9264°E	Category:Nekrasovka (Moscow Metro) on Wikimedia Commons
#16 Troitskaya line	ZIL	ЗИЛ	<>	2025-09-13		column, triple-span		Category:ZIL (Moscow Metro, Troitskaya Line) on Wikimedia Commons
#16 Troitskaya line	Krymskaya	Крымская	<>Q48953622	2025-09-13		column, triple-span		Category:Krymskaya (Moscow Metro) on Wikimedia Commons
#16 Troitskaya line	Akademicheskaya	Академическая	Q48956705	2025-09-13		column, triple-span		Category:Akademicheskaya (Moscow Metro, Troitskaya Line) on Wikimedia Commons
#16 Troitskaya line	Vavilovskaya	Вавиловская		2025-09-13		column, triple-span		Category:Vavilovskaya (Moscow Metro) on Wikimedia Commons
#16 Troitskaya line	Novatorskaya	Новаторская	Transfer for #11 Bolshaya Koltsevaya line at Novatorskaya	2024-09-07	−11 m	column, triple-span		Category:Novatorskaya (Moscow Metro, Troitskaya Line) on Wikimedia Commons
#16 Troitskaya line	Universitet Druzhby Narodov	Университет Дружбы Народов		2024-09-07	−23 m	column, triple-span		Category:Universitet Druzhby Narodov (Moscow Metro) on Wikimedia Commons
#16 Troitskaya line	Generala Tyuleneva	Генерала Тюленева		2024-09-07		column, triple-span		Category:Generala Tyuleneva (Moscow Metro) on Wikimedia Commons
#16 Troitskaya line	Tyutchevskaya	Тютчевская		2024-09-07	-12.65 m	column, triple-span		Category:Tyutchevskaya (Moscow Metro) on Wikimedia Commons
#16 Troitskaya line	Kornilovskaya	Корниловская		2024-12-28	-16.18 m	column, triple-span		Category:Kornilovskaya (Moscow Metro) on Wikimedia Commons
#16 Troitskaya line	Kommunarka	Коммунарка		2024-12-28		column, double-span		
#16 Troitskaya line	Novomoskovskaya	Новомосковская	Transfer for #1 Sokolnicheskaya line at Novomoskovskaya	2024-12-28		single-vault, shallow		
#17 Rublyovo-Arkhangelskaya line	Delovoy Tsentr	Деловой центр	Transfer for #4A Filyovskaya line at Delovoy Tsentr Transfer for #8A Solntsevskaya line at Delovoy Tsentr	2018-02-26				
#17 Rublyovo-Arkhangelskaya line	Shelepikha	Шелепиха	{ }	2018-02-26				
#17 Rublyovo-Arkhangelskaya line	Zvenigorodskaya	Звенигородская		2026-09-05				
#17 Rublyovo-Arkhangelskaya line	Narodnoye Opolcheniye	Народное Ополчение	Transfer for #11 Bolshaya Koltsevaya line at Narodnoye Opolcheniye	2026-09-05				
#17 Rublyovo-Arkhangelskaya line	Bulvar Generala Karbysheva	Бульвар Генерала Карбышева		2026-09-05				

== Expansion dynamics ==
Data

== Notes ==
- A. All ridership statistics are daily average passengers for 2007.
