= Narodnoye Opolcheniye (Rublyovo-Arkhangelskaya line) =

Moscow Metro station

Narodnoye Opolcheniye Народное Ополчение

General information
- Location: Khoroshyovo-Mnyovniki District, North-Western Administrative Okrug; Moscow; Russia
- Coordinates: 55.7762°N 37.486°E
- System: Moscow Metro
- Owner: Moskovsky Metropoliten
- Line: Rublyovo-Arkhangelskaya line
- Platforms: 1 island platform
- Tracks: 2

Construction
- Structure type: Shallow column station
- Platform levels: 1

History
- Opened: 5 September 2026
Route map
Rublyovo-Arkhangelskaya line
Location
- Location within Moscow Metro

Narodnoye Opolcheniye (Russian: Народное Ополчение) is a station on Rublyovo-Arkhangelskaya line of Moscow Metro. It was opened on 5 September 2026 as part of the first section of the line, between Delovoy Tsentr and Bulvar Generala Karbysheva. The station is between Zvenigorodskaya and Bulvar Generala Karbysheva. There is a transfer to the eponymous station of Bolshaya Koltsevaya line.

The station is located under Marshala Zhukova Avenue, not far from Narognogo Opolcheniya Street. It derives its name from the latter.
