= Rublyovo-Arkhangelskaya line =

Line of Moscow Metro

Overview
- Native name: Рублёво-Архангельская линия
- Locale: Moscow
- Stations: 5

Service
- Type: Rapid transit
- System: Moscow Metro
- Operator: Moskovsky Metropoliten

History
- Opened: September 5, 2026

Technical
- Line length: 6.7 kilometres (4.2 mi)
- Character: Underground
- Track gauge: 1,520 mm (4 ft 11 27/32 in)
- Electrification: Third rail

Rublyovo-Arkhangelskaya line (Russian: Рублёво-Архангельская линия) (Line 17, Graphite line) is a line of the Moscow Metro. The first section of the line, between Delovoy Tsentr and Bulvar Generala Karbysheva, was opened on 5 September 2026. This first section incorporated two stations, Delovoy Tsentr and Shelepikha, which were originally part of Bolshaya Koltsevaya line. The construction began in 2021 and is planned to end after 2028, opening in three phases. Originally, Phase 1 was scheduled to be completed by 2026–2027 constructing the section from Delovoy Tsentr to Lipovaya Roscha, and phase two is scheduled to open after 2028 expanding the line from Lipovaya Roshcha to Novorizhskaya station. In the future, it will be connected with the Biryulyovskaya line and is planned to extend up to the city of Krasnogorsk in 2030.

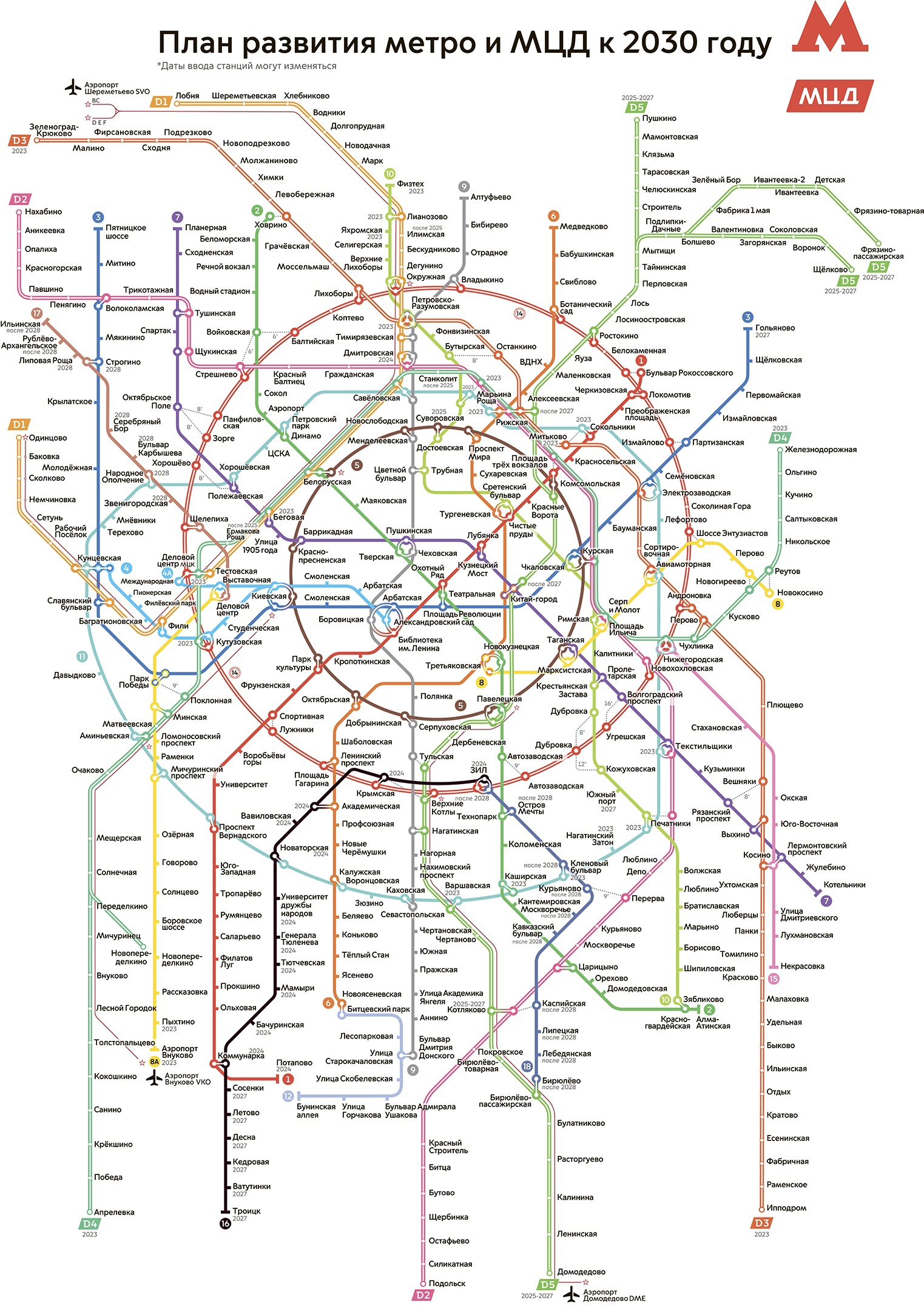
Line 17 colored light brown in future Moscow Metro map

== Stations ==
English	Russian	Transfer	Status	Opening
Izumrudnye Kholmy	Изумрудные холмы		Planned	2030
Krasnogorskaya	Красногорская	Krasnogorskaya	Planned	2030
Novorizhskaya	Новорижская		Under Construction	2027
SberSiti	СберСити		Under Construction	2027
Lipovaya Roshcha	Липовая Роща		Under Construction	2027
Strogino	Строгино	Strogino	Under Construction	2027
Serebryanyy Bor	Серебряный Бор		Under Construction	2027
Bulvar Generala Karbysheva	Бульвар Генерала Карбышева		Opened on 5 September 2026	2026
Narodnoye Opolcheniye	Народное Ополчение	Narodnoye Opolcheniye	Opened on 5 September 2026	2026
Zvenigorodskaya	Звенигородская		Opened on 5 September 2026	2026
Shelepikha	Шелепиха	Shelepikha; Moskva-City (within walking distance)	Initially opened as part of Line 11, reopened with the opening of Line 17	2018 (as part of Line 11), 2026 (as part of Line 17)
Delovoy Tsentr	Деловой Центр	Delovoy Tsentr; Delovoy Tsentr; Moskva-City (within walking distance); Kamushki (within walking distance); Moskva-City (within walking distance)	Initially opened as part of Line 11, reopened with the opening of Line 17	2018 (as part of Line 11), 2026 (as part of Line 17)
