= Delovoy Tsentr =

Delovoy Tsentr may stand for one of the stations of Moscow Metro:

- Delovoy Tsentr (Kalininsko-Solntsevskaya Line)
- Delovoy Tsentr (Moscow Central Circle)
- Delovoy Tsentr (Bolshaya Koltsevaya line)
- Vystavochnaya, formerly Delovoy Tsentr.
