= Zvenigorodskaya (Moscow Metro) =

Moscow Metro station

Zvenigorodskaya Звенигородская

General information
- Location: Khoroshyovo-Mnyovniki District; Moscow; Russia
- Coordinates: 55.76591°N 37.511729°E
- System: Moscow Metro
- Owner: Moskovsky Metropoliten
- Line: Rublyovo-Arkhangelskaya line
- Platforms: 1 island platform
- Tracks: 2

Construction
- Platform levels: 1

History
- Opened: 5 September 2026
Route map
Rublyovo-Arkhangelskaya line
Location
- Location within Moscow Metro

Zvenigorodskaya (Russian: Звенигородская) is a station on Rublyovo-Arkhangelskaya line of Moscow Metro. It was opened on 5 September 2026 as part of the first section of the line, between Delovoy Tsentr and Bulvar Generala Karbysheva. The station is between Shelepikha and Narodnoye Opolcheniye.

Zvenigorodskaya is located at the crossing of 1st Silikatny Road and Shenogina Street. The name is derived from Zvenigorodskoye Highway located nearby.
