= Shelepikha (Rublyovo-Arkhangelskaya line) =

Moscow Metro station

Shelepikha Шелепиха
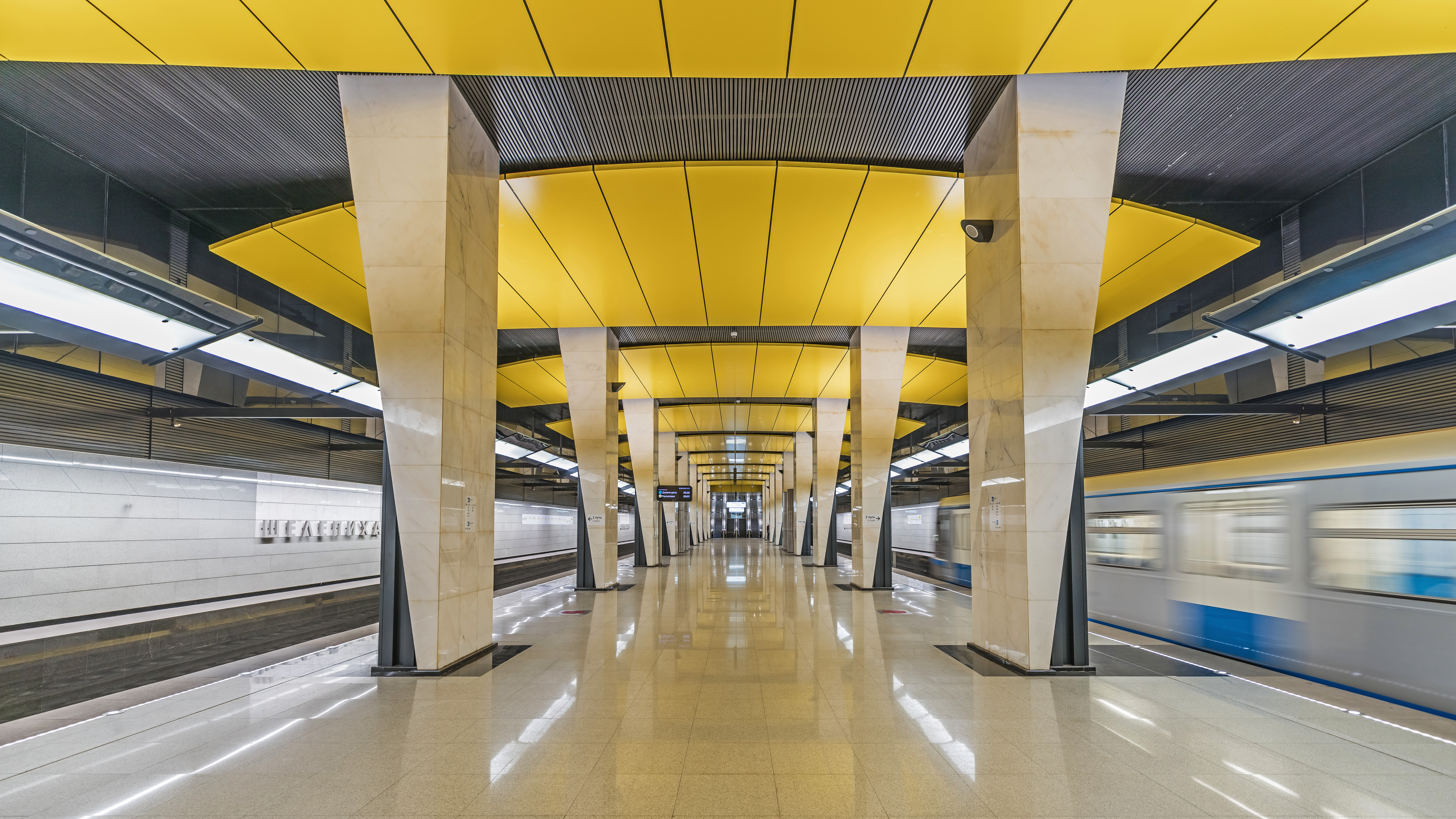

General information
- Location: Presnensky District, Central Administrative Okrug; Moscow; Russia
- Coordinates: 55.7574°N 37.524°E
- System: Moscow Metro station
- Owner: Moskovsky Metropoliten
- Line: Rublyovo-Arkhangelskaya line
- Platforms: 1 island platform
- Tracks: 2

Construction
- Structure type: Shallow column station
- Depth: 18 metres (59 ft)
- Platform levels: 1

History
- Opened: 26 February 2018; 5 September 2026 (reopening)
- Closed: 22 June 2024

Services
Preceding station	Moscow Metro	Following station
Zvenigorodskaya towards Ilyinskaya	Rublyovo-Arkhangelskaya line	Delovoy Tsentr Terminus
Out-of-station interchange
Delovoy Tsentr anticlockwise / outer	Moscow Central Circle transfer at Shelepikha	Khoroshyovo clockwise / inner
Route map
Rublyovo-Arkhangelskaya line
Location
- Location within Moscow Metro

Shelepikha (Russian: Шелепиха) is a station of the Moscow Metro. It opened on 26 February 2018 as one of five initial stations on the Bolshaya Koltsevaya line. It was closed on 22 June 2024 and reopened on 5 September 2026.

Shelepikha was not part of the Bolshaya Koltsevaya line's circular path, but is on a spur that runs to Delovoy Tsentr. In 2026, the Rublyovo-Arkhangelskaya line incorporated this station.

== Location ==
Shelepikha is in the Presnensky District of Moscow's Central Administrative Okrug. It is about 1.5 kilometres (0.93 mi) north of the Moscow International Business Center. There are entrances on Shelepikhinskoye Shosse and Shmitovsky Proyezd. The station takes its name from the former settlement of Shelepikha, which was absorbed into Moscow in the early 1900s and Shelepikhinskoye Shosse.

The station is part of a transit hub that allows access to Shelepikha station on the Moscow Central Circle. The hub was planned to include bus routes as well as access to Testovskaya, a station on the Moscow Railway.

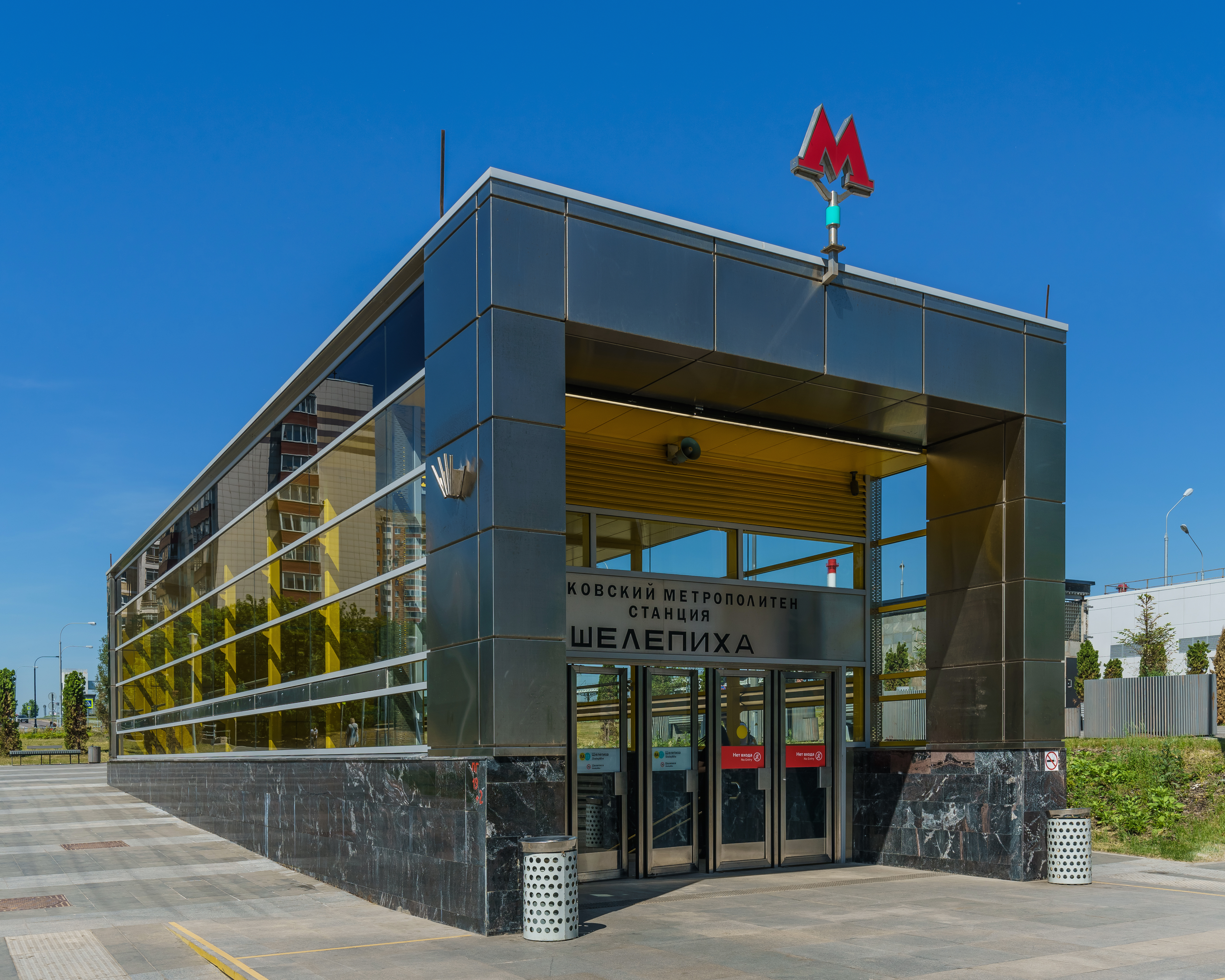
One of the entrance pavilions

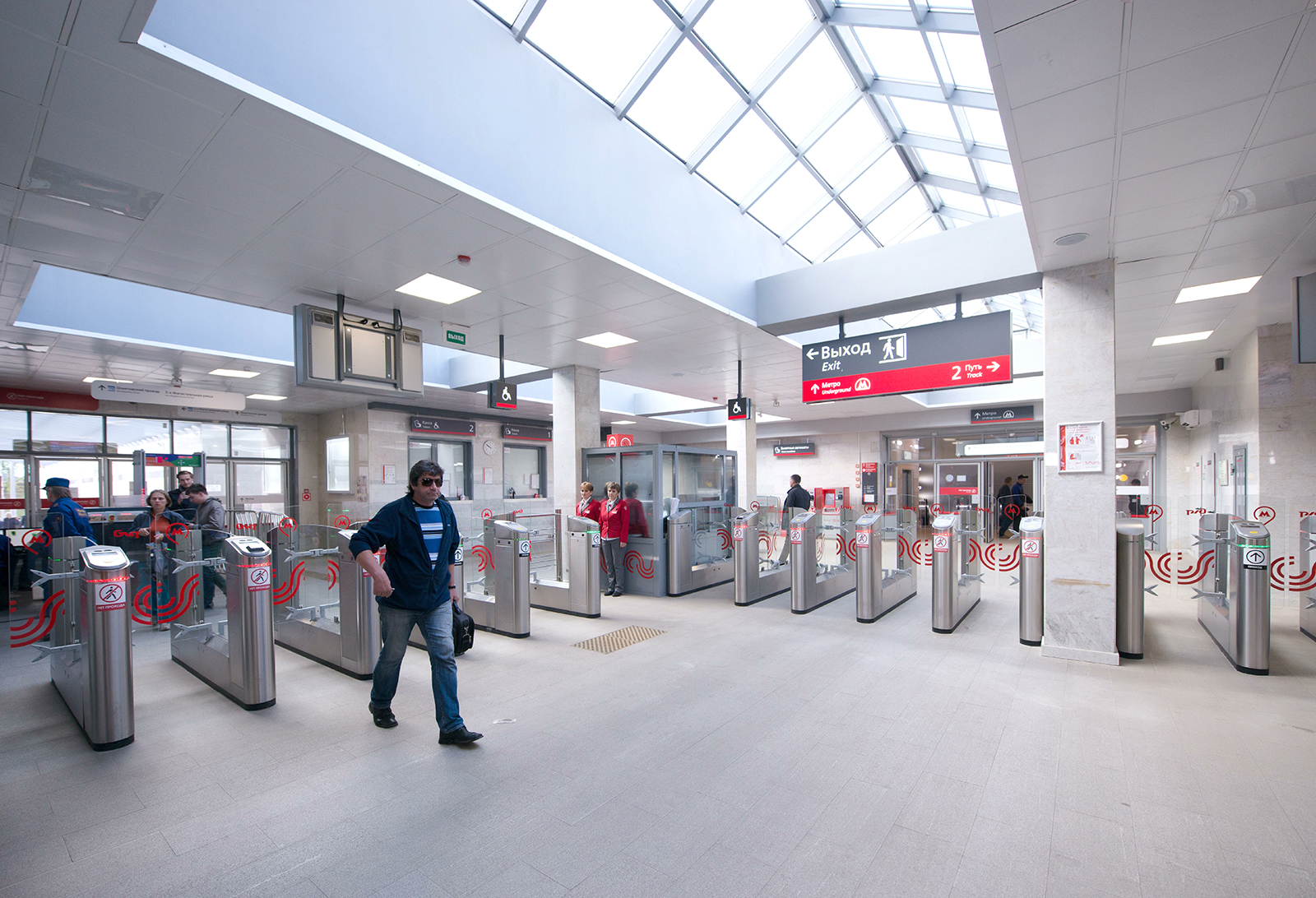
Interchange point between Shelepikha MCC station and Shelepikha metro station
