= Bulvar Generala Karbysheva (Moscow Metro) =

Moscow Metro station

Bulvar Generala Karbysheva Бульвар Генерала Карбышева

General information
- Location: Khoroshyovo-Mnyovniki District, North-Western Administrative Okrug; Moscow; Russia
- System: Moscow Metro
- Owner: Moskovsky Metropoliten
- Line: Rublyovo-Arkhangelskaya line

History
- Opened: 5 September 2026
Route map
Rublyovo-Arkhangelskaya line
Location
- Location within Moscow Metro

Bulvar Generala Karbysheva (Russian: Бульвар Генерала Карбышева) is a station on Rublyovo-Arkhangelskaya line of Moscow Metro. It serves as the northwest terminus of the line. It was opened on 5 September 2026 as part of the first section of the line, between Delovoy Tsentr and Bulvar Generala Karbysheva. The adjacent station is Narodnoye Opolcheniye.

The station is located in Khoroshyovo-Mnyovniki District, at the intersection of Generala Karbysheva Boulevard, which gives its name to the station, and Marshala Tukhachevskogo Street. Soviet General Dmitry Karbyshev was commander of the Soviet Engineer Troops, later murdered at Mauthausen concentration camp.

A large bas-relief of Karbyshev is located at the entrance to the station, as well as decorative panels and gold stars in honour of the Soviet and Russian Engineer Troops. The eight panels on the walls of the station show various stages in the development of the engineering troops, including the First and Second World Wars and the Russo-Ukrainian war.
