= Moskva-City =

Moskva-City may refer to:

- Moscow International Business Center, or Moscow-City, in Russia
- Moskva-City (Filyovskaya line), a station of the Moscow Metro
- Moskva-City (Moscow Central Circle), a station of the Moscow Metro
- Moskva-City railway station, MCD4, a station of the Moscow Central Diameters
- Testovskaya (Moskva-City) railway station, a station of the Moscow Central Diameters
