= Khoroshyovo-Mnyovniki District =

Khoroshyovo-Mnyovniki District район Хорошёво-Мнёвники (Russian)
- District
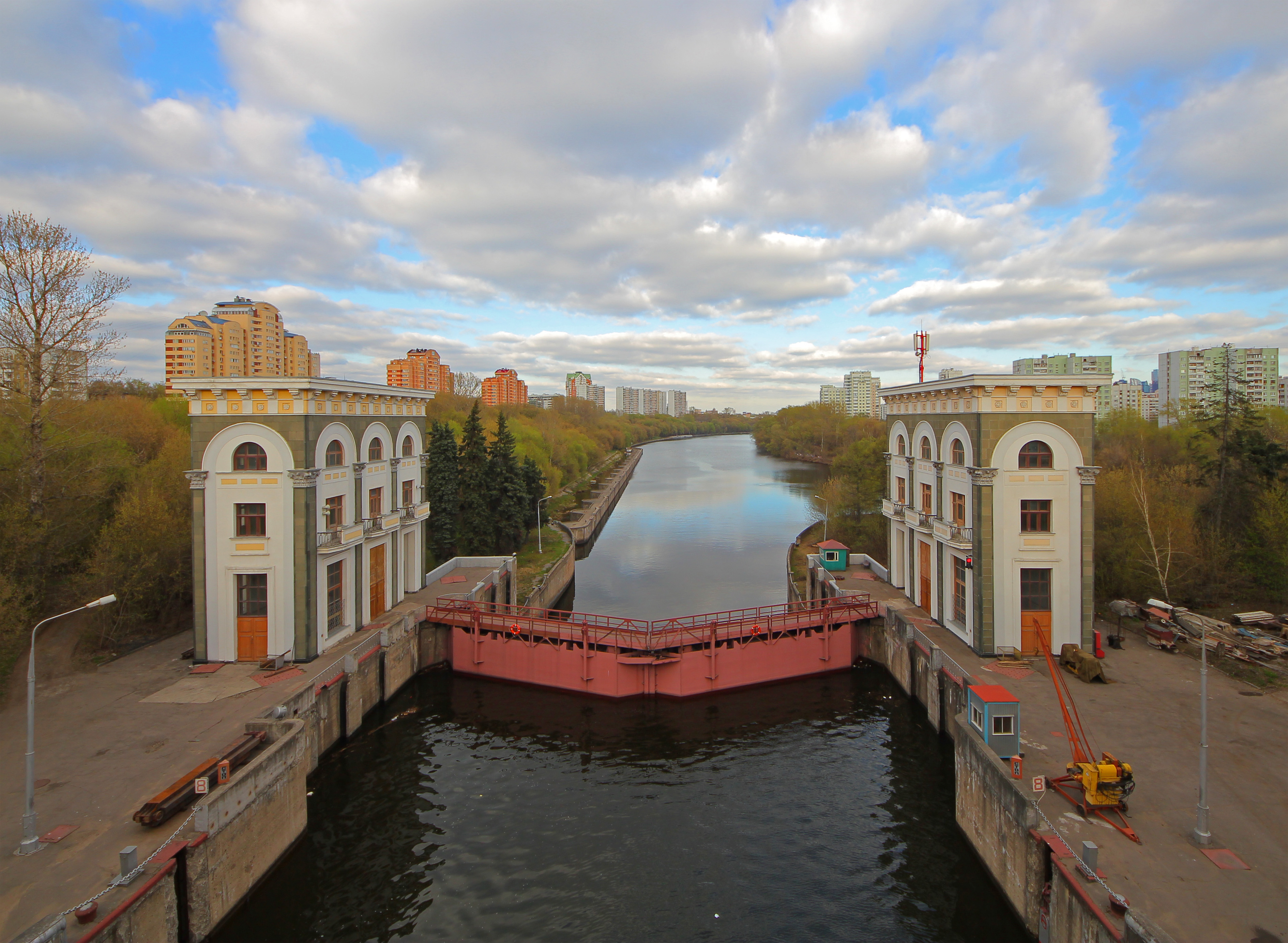
- Moskva River locks near Karamyshev Embankment, Khoroshyovo-Mnyovniki District

- Flag Coat of arms
- Location of Khoroshyovo-Mnyovniki District in Moscow
- Coordinates: 55°46′37″N 37°28′09″E
- Country: Russia
- Federal subject: Moscow

Area
  - Total: 15 km^{2} (5.8 sq mi)

Population (2010 Census)
  - Total: 166,804
  - Density: 11,000/km^{2} (29,000/sq mi)
  - Urban: 99.95%
  - Rural: 0.05%
- Time zone: UTC+
- OKTMO ID: 45371000
- Website: http://horoshevo-mnevniki.mos.ru/

Khoroshyovo-Mnyovniki (Russian: район Хорошёво-Мнёвники) – sometimes spelled Khoroshyovo-Mnevniki (Russian: район Хорошёво-Мне́вники) or Khoroshevo-Mnevniki (Russian: район Хорошево-Мневники) due to common replacement of letter "yo" with "ye" in Russian – is a neighborhood of North-Western Borough of the federal city of Moscow, Russia. It is about 7 km west of the center of Moscow, with the Moscow river bordering the western and southern sides. The area of the neighborhood is 15 square kilometres (5.8 mi^{2}).

Population: 166,804 (2010 census); 146,968 (2002 census). It is the second most populous neighborhood of the borough (after Mitino).

== Attractions ==
Approximately one third of the district is occupied by Serebryany Bor ("Silver Pinewood") park. Also in the district are Holy Trinity Church in Khoroshyovo, and Terekhovo village.

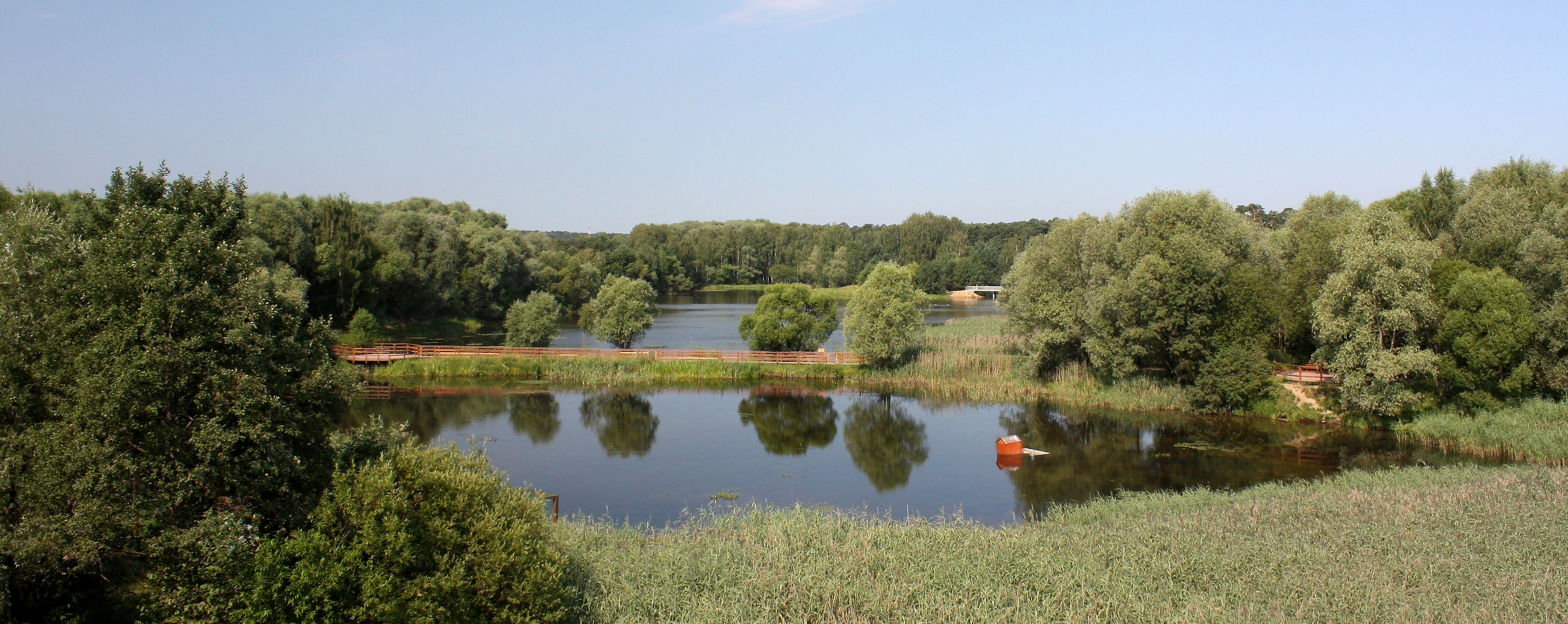
Moscow, Serebryany Bor. Lake Bezdonnoye ('Bottomless Lake')

== See also ==
- Administrative divisions of Moscow
