= Delovoy Tsentr (Rublyovo-Arkhangelskaya line) =

Moscow Metro station

Delovoy Tsentr Деловой Центр
- The station on 5 September, 2026

General information
- Location: Presnensky District, Central Administrative Okrug; Moscow; Russia
- Coordinates: 55.7489°N 37.5391°E
- System: Moscow Metro station
- Owner: Moskovsky Metropoliten
- Line: Rublyovo-Arkhangelskaya line
- Platforms: 1 island platform
- Tracks: 2

Construction
- Structure type: Deep column station
- Platform levels: 1

History
- Opened: 26 February 2018; 5 September 2026 (reopening)
- Closed: 22 June 2024

Services
Preceding station	Moscow Metro	Following station
Shelepikha towards Ilyinskaya	Rublyovo-Arkhangelskaya line	Terminus
Moskva-City towards Mezhdunarodnaya	Filyovskaya line (business centre branch) transfer at Delovoy Tsentr	Kiyevskaya towards Aleksandrovsky Sad
Park Pobedy towards Aeroport Vnukovo	Kalininsko-Solntsevskaya line (Solntsevsky radius) transfer at Delovoy Tsentr	Terminus
Route map
Rublyovo-Arkhangelskaya line
Location
- Location within Moscow Metro

Delovoy Tsentr (Russian: Деловой Центр) is a station of the Moscow Metro. The station opened on 26 February 2018 as one of five initial stations on the Bolshaya Koltsevaya line. However, the station was closed in 2024 and reopened as a part of the Rublyovo-Arkhangelskaya line in 2026.

Delovoy Tsentr was the terminus for a spur off the Bolshaya Koltsevaya line that included Shelepikha station. The Rublyovo–Arkhangelskaya line, which opened in 2026, incorporated these stations.

The station is within the Moscow International Business Center and takes its name from the complex.

== Transfer ==
It offers transfers to Delovoy Tsentr on the Solntsevskaya line as well as Delovoy Tsentr on the Filyovskaya Line's business center branch.
