= Khoroshyovskaya (Moscow Metro) =

Moscow Metro station

Khoroshyovskaya Хорошёвская
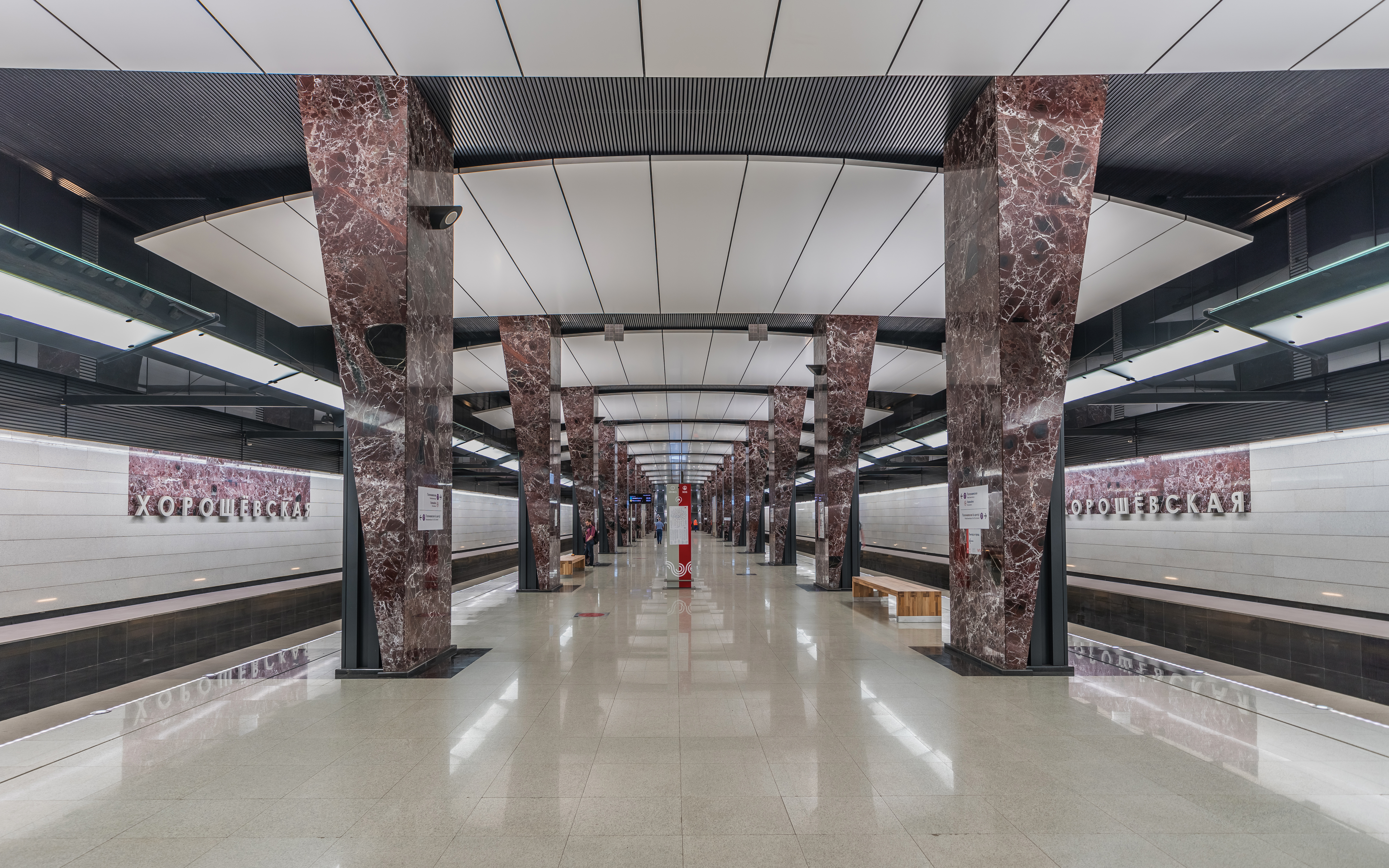
- Platform of Khoroshyovskaya metro station

General information
- Location: Khoroshyovsky District, Northern Administrative Okrug; Moscow; Russia
- Coordinates: 55.7766°N 37.5181°E
- System: Moscow Metro station
- Owner: Moskovsky Metropoliten
- Line: Bolshaya Koltsevaya line
- Platforms: 1 island platform
- Tracks: 2

Construction
- Structure type: Shallow column station
- Depth: 21 metres (69 ft)
- Platform levels: 1

History
- Opened: 26 February 2018

Services
Preceding station	Moscow Metro	Following station
Narodnoye Opolcheniye anticlockwise / outer	Bolshaya Koltsevaya line	CSKA clockwise / inner
Oktyabrskoye Pole towards Planernaya	Tagansko-Krasnopresnenskaya line transfer at Polezhayevskaya	Begovaya towards Kotelniki
Out-of-station interchange
Shelepikha anticlockwise / outer	Moscow Central Circle transfer at Khoroshyovo	Zorge clockwise / inner
Route map
Bolshaya Koltsevaya line
Location
- Location within Moscow Metro

Khoroshyovskaya (Russian: Хорошёвская) is a station on the Bolshaya Koltsevaya line of the Moscow Metro. It opened on 26 February 2018 as one of five initial stations on the new line.

The station's name comes from the area of Khoroshyovo, which was supposedly named by Ivan the Terrible.

== Infrastructure ==
Khoroshyovskaya has a direct connection to Polezhayevskaya on the Tagansko-Krasnopresnenskaya line and an out-of-station transfer to Khoroshyovo on the Moscow Central Circle. After opening of Narodnoye Opolcheniye station, the line now has two branches from Khoroshyovskaya, one that continues along the planned circle, and one that terminates at Delovoy Tsentr. The latter branch may ultimately become part of the planned Rublyovo-Arkhangelskaya line.
