= Vladykino =

Vladykino may refer to:

- Vladykino (Serpukhovsko-Timiryazevskaya line), a metro station
- Vladykino (Moscow Central Circle), a metro station
- Vladykino (rural locality), several rural localities in Russia
