= Polezhayevskaya =

Moscow Metro station

Polezhayevskaya Полежаевская
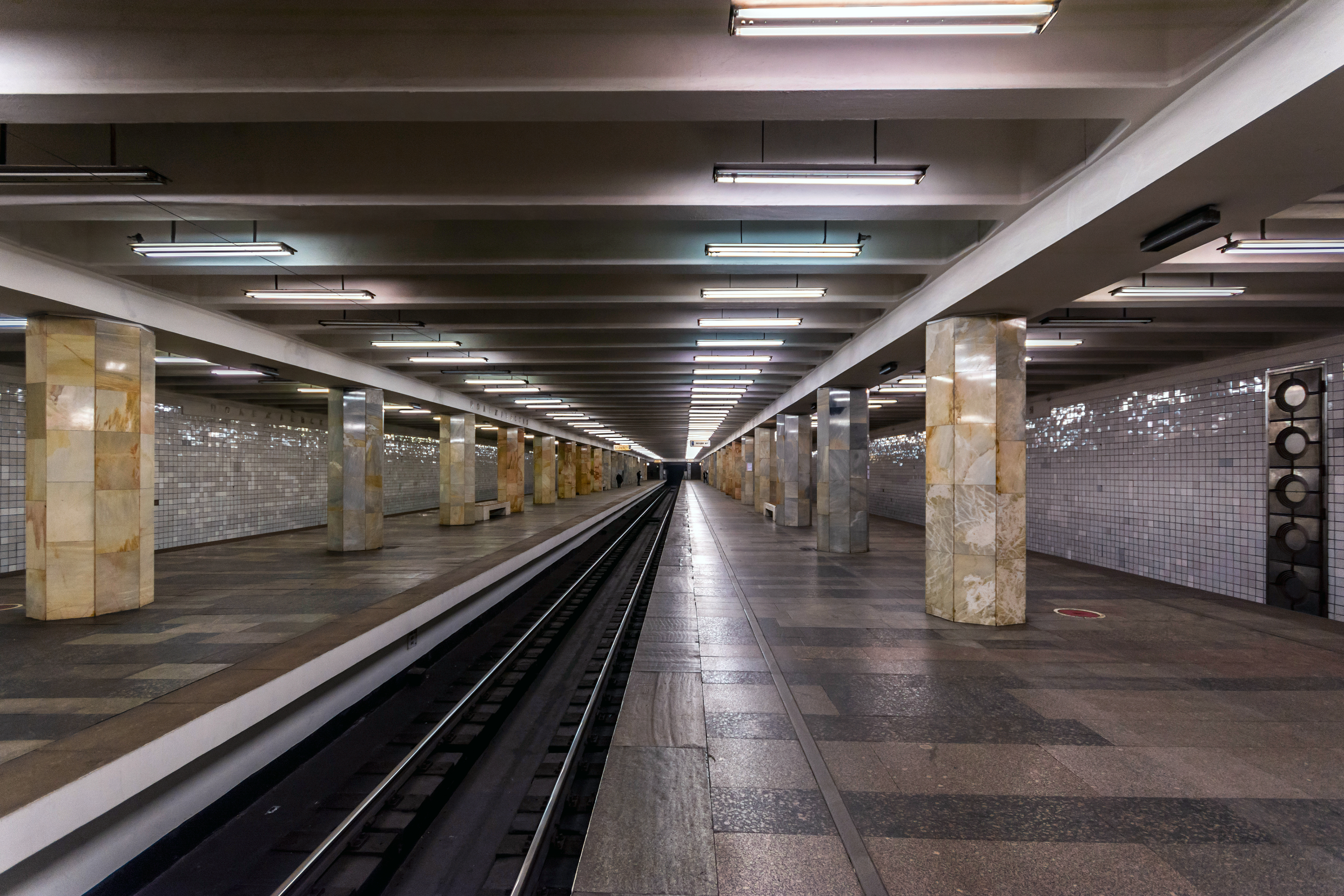

General information
- Location: Khoroshyovsky District; Northern Administrative Okrug; Moscow; Russia
- Coordinates: 55.7775°N 37.5192°E
- System: Moscow Metro station
- Owner: Moskovsky Metropoliten
- Line: Tagansko-Krasnopresnenskaya line
- Platforms: 2 island platforms
- Tracks: 3
- Connections: Bus: 38, 39, 48, 64, 155, 271, 294, 800; Trolleybus: 20, 20к, 21, 35, 43, 65, 86

Construction
- Platform levels: 1
- Parking: No

Other information
- Station code: 123

History
- Opened: 30 December 1972; 53 years ago

Services
Preceding station	Moscow Metro	Following station
Oktyabrskoye Pole towards Planernaya	Tagansko-Krasnopresnenskaya line	Begovaya towards Kotelniki
Narodnoye Opolcheniye anticlockwise / outer	Bolshaya Koltsevaya line transfer at Khoroshyovskaya	CSKA clockwise / inner
Out-of-station interchange
Shelepikha anticlockwise / outer	Moscow Central Circle transfer at Khoroshyovo	Zorge clockwise / inner
Route map
Location
- Location within Moscow Metro

Polezhayevskaya (Russian: Полежаевская) is a station on the Moscow Metro's Tagansko-Krasnopresnenskaya line. It opened on 30 December 1972 as part of the original Krasnopresnenkiy radius and Krasnopresnenskaya line, and is unusual in having three through tracks (although it was not the first such station, see Partizanskaya). The station was initially intended to be at a junction to a branch toward Serebryanny Bor. However, the branch was scrapped after construction had already started, and the station was completed as originally planned.

The station is named after Vasily Polezhayev, who was the head of Mosmetrostroy (The Moscow Metro building organisation) in 1958-1972. Its widened column tri-span design has a row of pillars in the centre of each of the two platforms, creating a wide space above the centre track. The octagonal pillars are coated with yellow marble of different tones and the walls covered with white ceramic tiles are accredited to the architects A. Fokina and L. Popov.

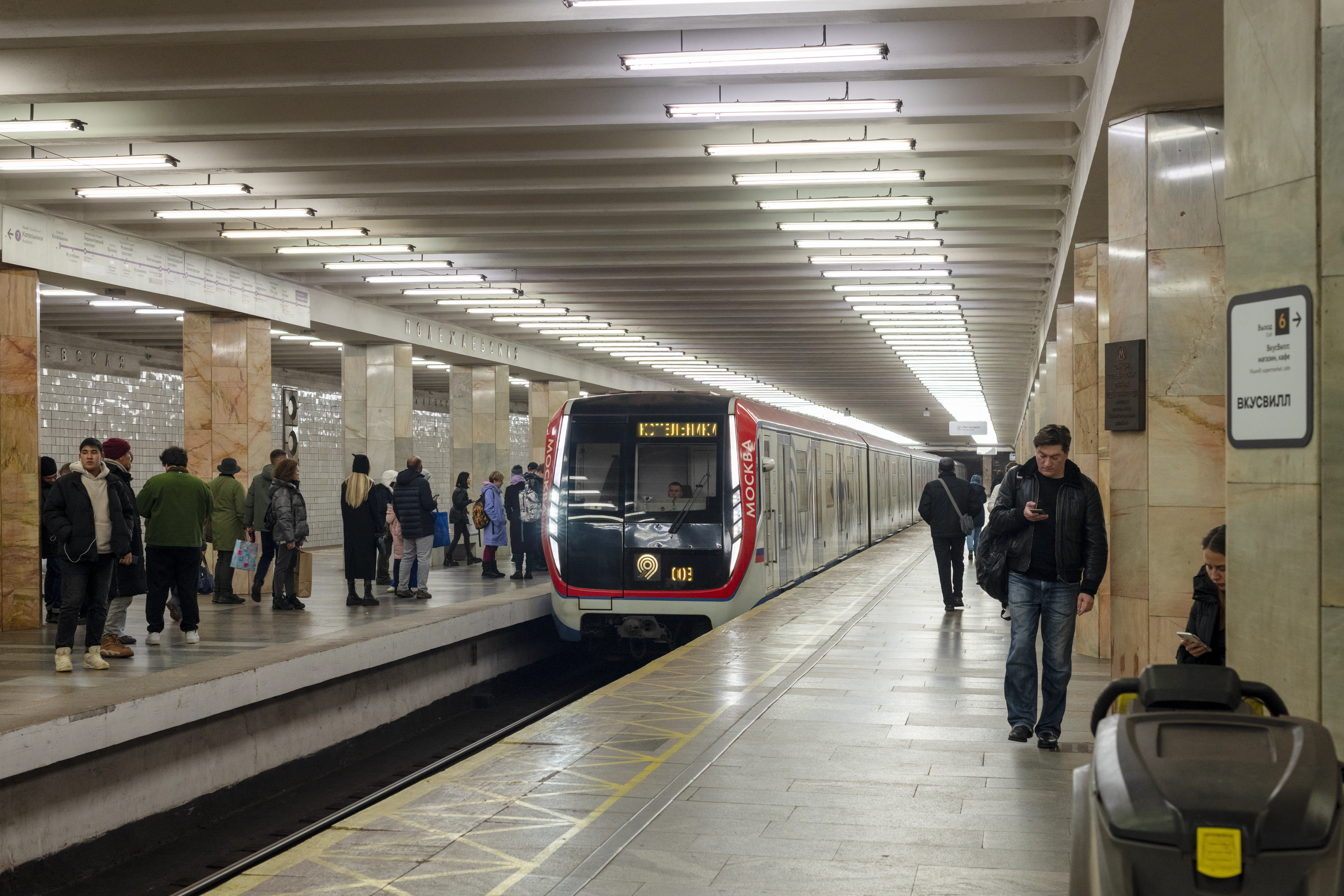
Southbound train on middle track (2023)

Before 2015 only one of the platforms (and thus two of the tracks) is used by passengers. The second platform has been opened at 14 November 2015 (due to construction) and the third track (with the tunnel that goes another 340 metres before a siding) is used for the night-time standing of trains. Two vestibules (one with a closed escalator) are interlinked with subways under the Khoroshovo highway.

The future prospects of the third track are dim, despite the construction of an adjoining station (Khoroshyovskaya) on the Bolshaya Koltsevaya line. Some plans for the interchange passages include switching the traffic from the central track to the unused one to fill it up and construct a staircase in its place.

The station has a daily passenger traffic total of 73,700.
