= Shelepikha =

Shelepikha may refer to:

- Shelepikha (Moscow), a historical area of the city of Moscow
- Shelepikha (Moscow Central Circle), a station on the Moscow Central Circle line of the Moscow Metro
- Shelepikha (Bolshaya Koltsevaya line), a station on the Bolshaya Koltsevaya line, a line of the Moscow Metro
