= Koptevo =

Koptevo (Russian: Коптево) may refer to:

- Koptevo District, a district of Northern Administrative Okrug, Moscow, Russia
- Koptevo (Moscow Central Circle), a station on the Moscow Central Circle, Russia
