= Khoroshyovo (Moscow Central Circle) =

Station on the Moscow Central Circle

Khoroshyovo Хорошёво
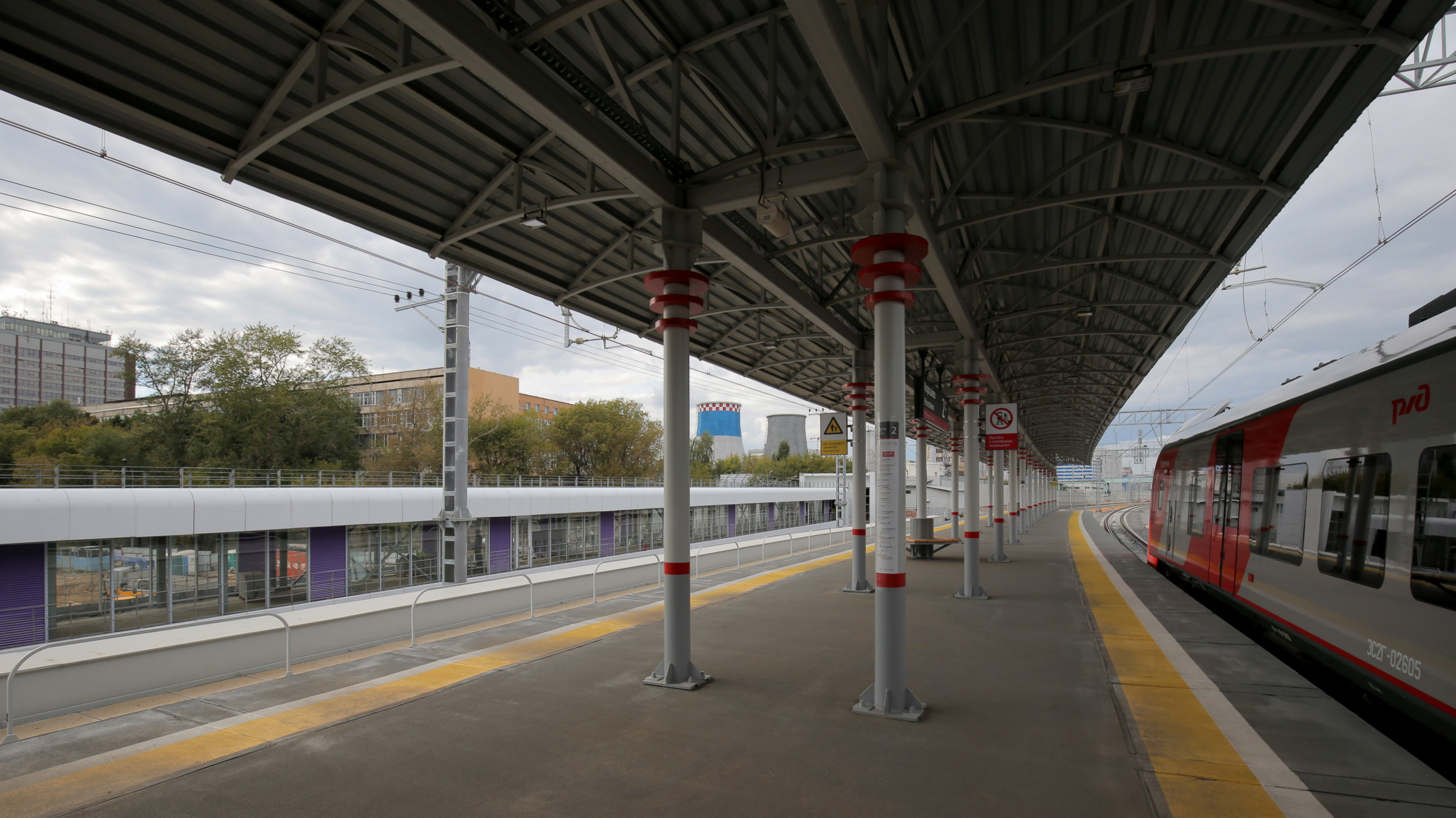

General information
- Coordinates: 55.7773°N 37.5071°E
- System: Moscow Metro
- Line: Moscow Central Circle
- Platforms: 2 side platforms
- Tracks: 2

History
- Opened: 10 September 2016; 9 years ago

Services
Preceding station	Moscow Metro	Following station
Shelepikha anticlockwise / outer	Moscow Central Circle	Zorge clockwise / inner
Out-of-station interchange
Oktyabrskoye Pole towards Planernaya	Tagansko-Krasnopresnenskaya line transfer at Polezhayevskaya	Begovaya towards Kotelniki
Shelepikha anticlockwise / outer	Bolshaya Koltsevaya line transfer at Khoroshyovskaya	CSKA clockwise / inner
Route map
Location
- Location within Moscow Metro

Khoroshyovo (Russian: Хорошёво) is a station on the Moscow Central Circle of the Moscow Metro. The station offers out-of-station transfers to Polezhayevskaya of Tagansko-Krasnopresnenskaya line and Khoroshyovskaya on the Bolshaya Koltsevaya line.
