= Moskva-City (Moscow Central Circle) =

Station on the Moscow Central Circle

Moskva-City Москва-Сити
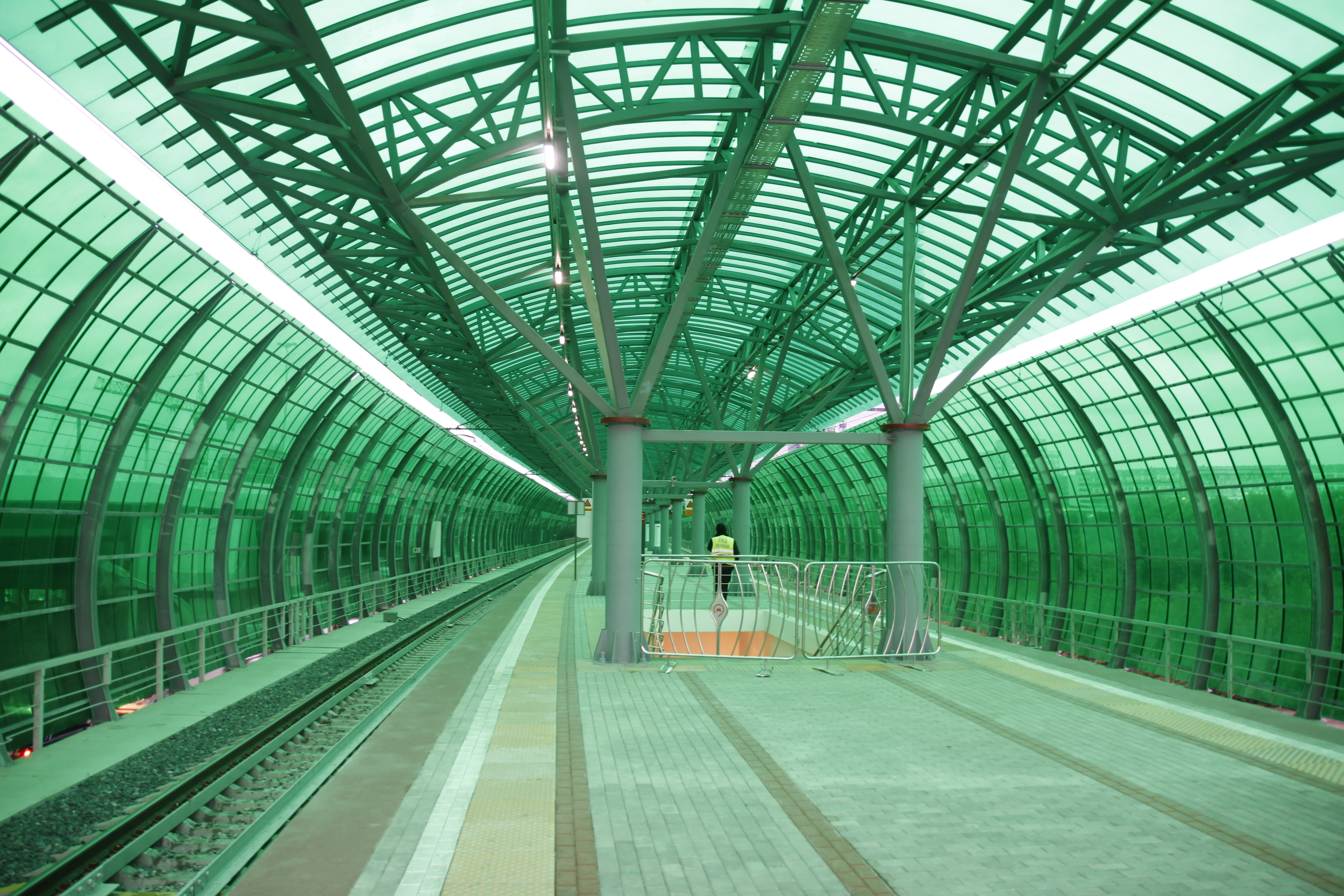

General information
- Coordinates: 55.7476°N 37.5320°E
- System: Moscow Metro
- Line: Moscow Central Circle
- Platforms: 2 island platforms
- Tracks: 2

History
- Opened: 10 September 2016; 9 years ago
- Former names: Delovoy Tsentr

Services
| Preceding station | Moscow Metro | Following station |
|---|---|---|
| Kutuzovskaya anticlockwise / outer | Moscow Central Circle | Shelepikha clockwise / inner |
Route map
Location
- Location within Moscow Metro

Moskva-City (Russian: Москва-Сити) is a station on the Moscow Central Circle of the Moscow Metro that opened in September 2016.

== Name ==
The station is named for the adjacent Moscow International Business Center, also known as Moscow City. The station name was originally planned to be Citi, but was changed to Delovoy Tsentr prior to the opening of the line.

== Transfer ==
The station offers out-of-station transfers to the Filyovskaya Line at Moskva-City.

== Gallery ==
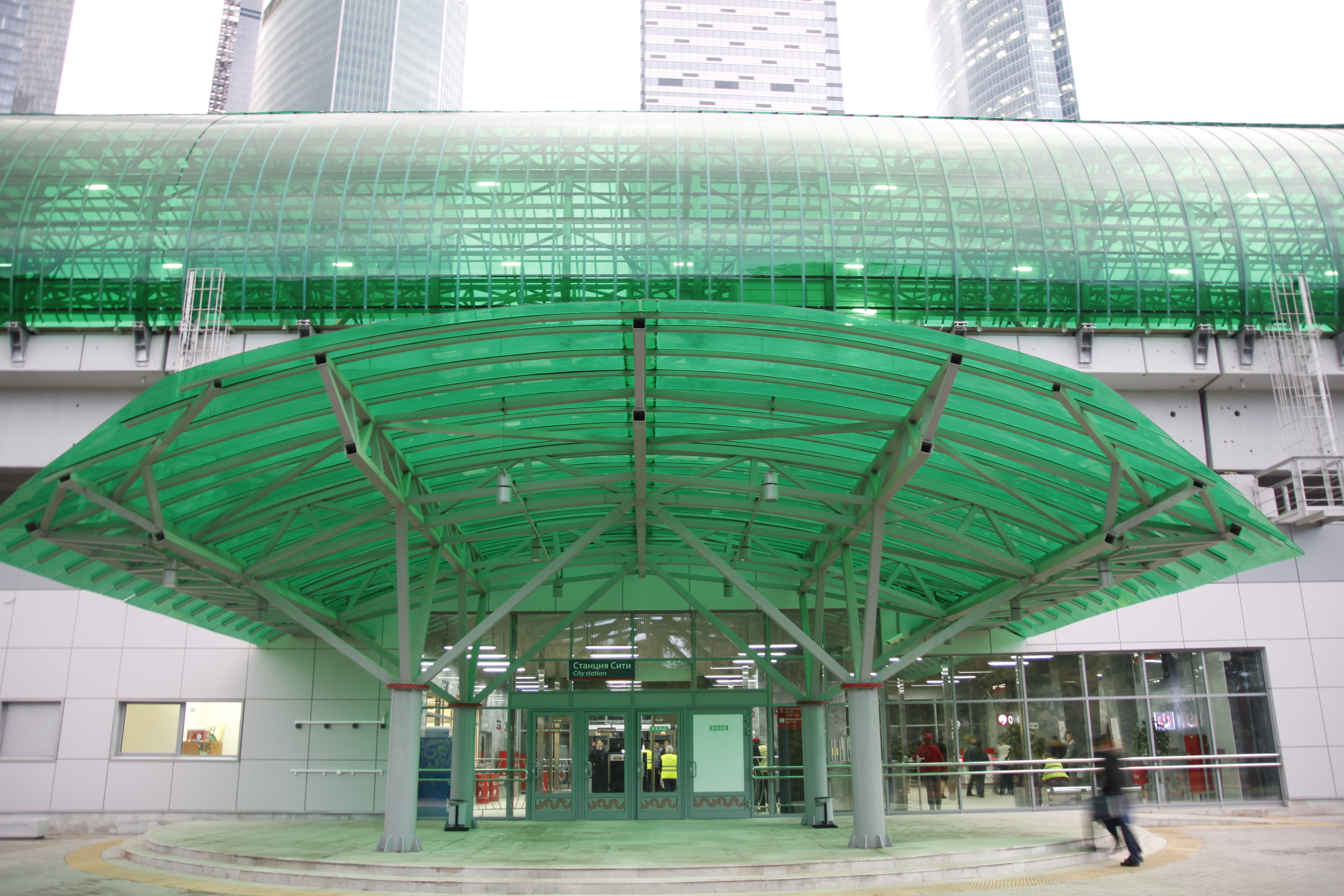
The station has green tinted transparent walls

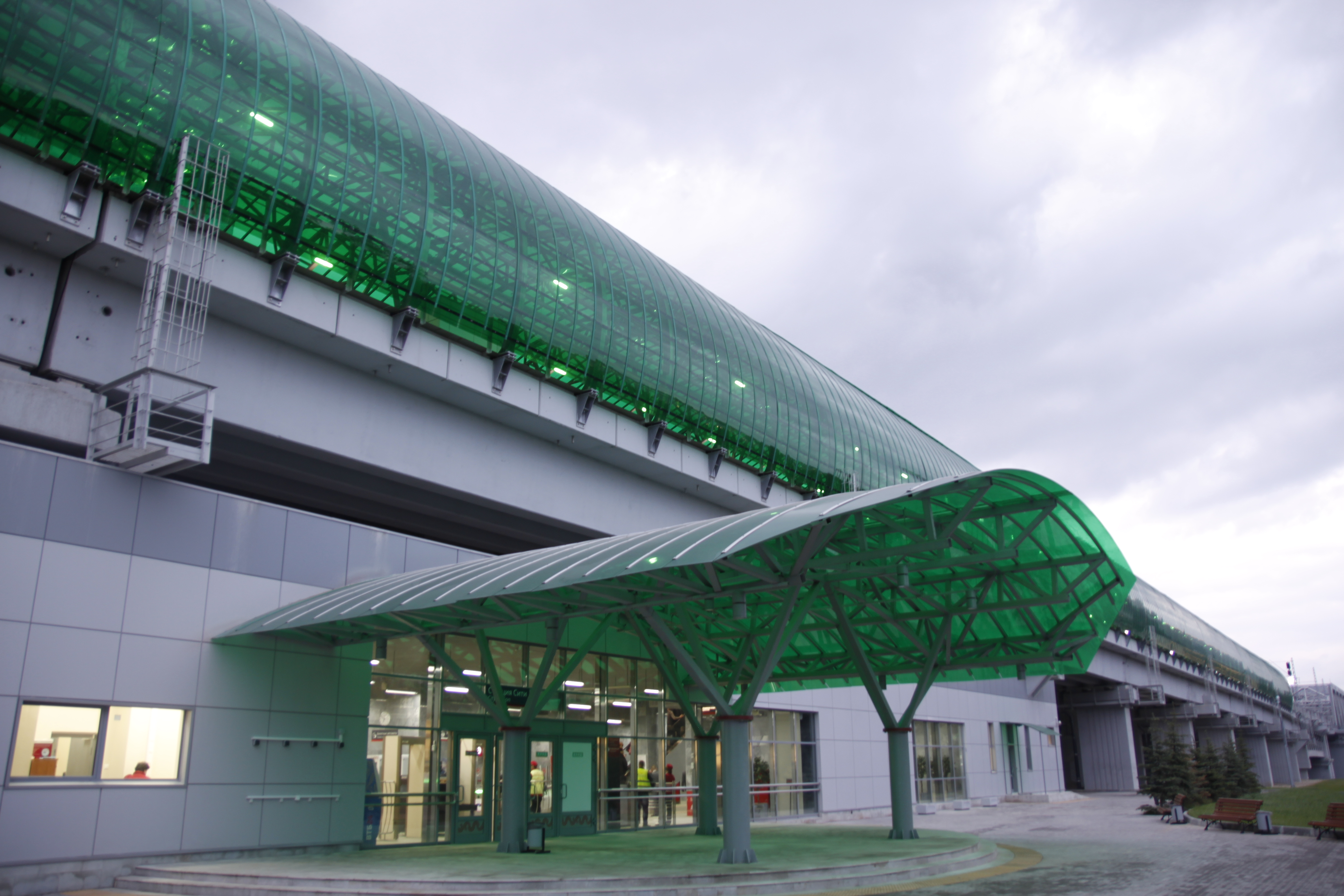

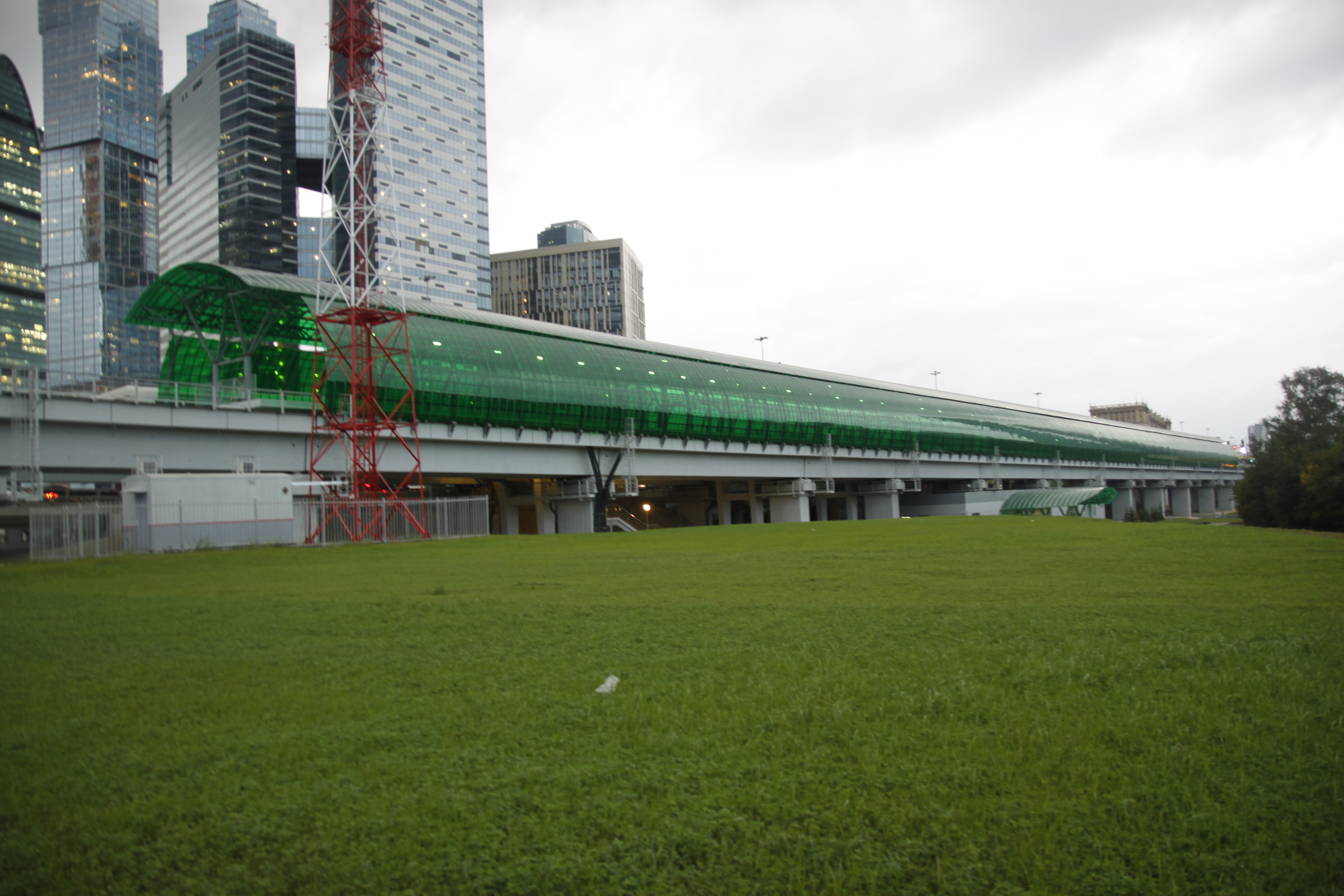

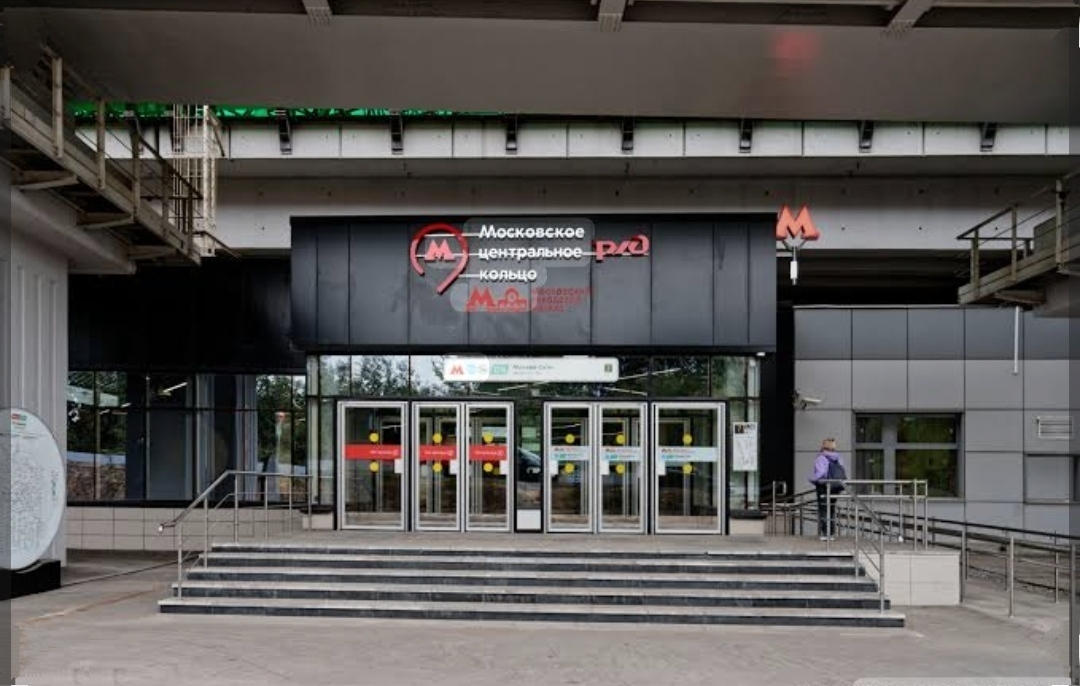
