= Likhobory (Moscow Central Circle) =

Station on the Moscow Central Circle

Likhobory Лихоборы
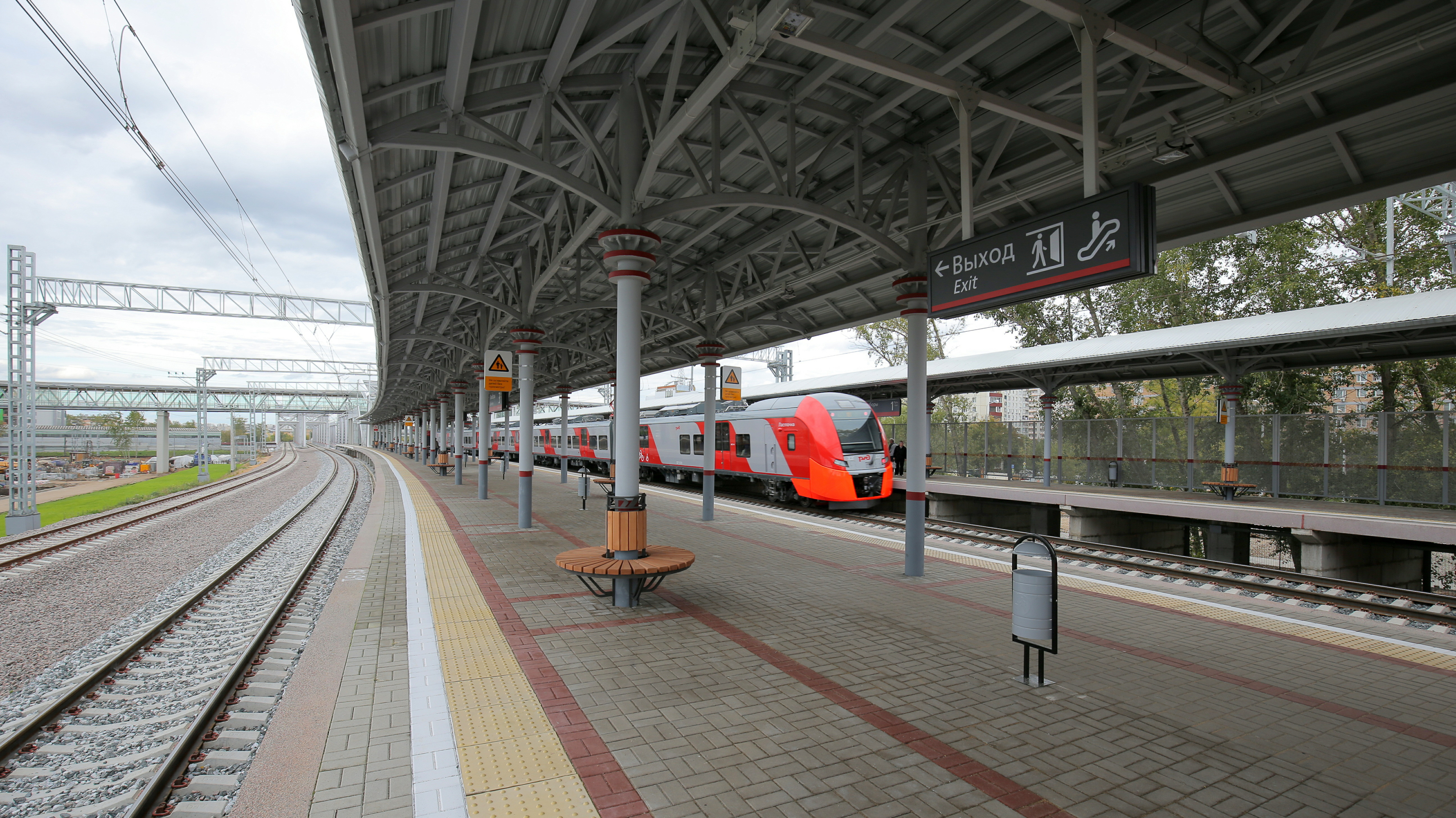

General information
- Coordinates: 55.8472°N 37.5511°E
- System: Moscow Metro
- Line: Moscow Central Circle
- Platforms: 2 side platforms
- Tracks: 2

History
- Opened: 10 September 2016; 9 years ago

Services
Preceding station	Moscow Metro	Following station
Koptevo anticlockwise / outer	Moscow Central Circle	Okruzhnaya clockwise / inner
Route map
Location
- Location within Moscow Metro

Likhobory (Russian: Лихоборы) is a station on the Moscow Central Circle of the Moscow Metro that opened in September 2016 in Moscow, Russia.

== Name ==
Likhobory station shares its name with a station on the Little Ring railway line and Verkhniye Likhobory, a station on the Lyublinsko-Dmitrovskaya Line. The name is derived from an area north of Moscow along the Likhoborka River. The station's working name during construction was Nikolaevskaya, but was changed by the city prior to the opening of the line.
