= Moscow Central Circle =

Line of the Moscow Metro

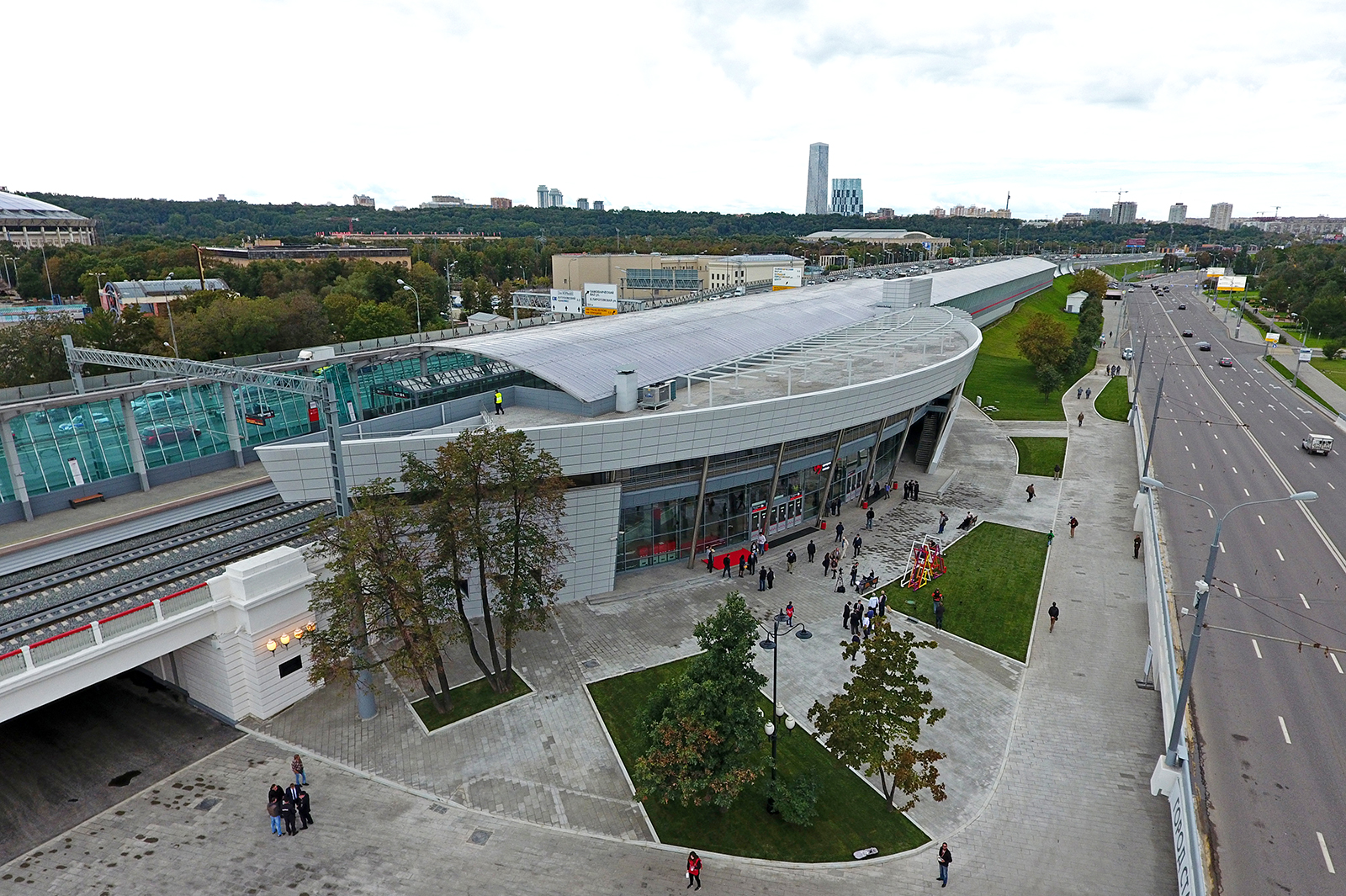
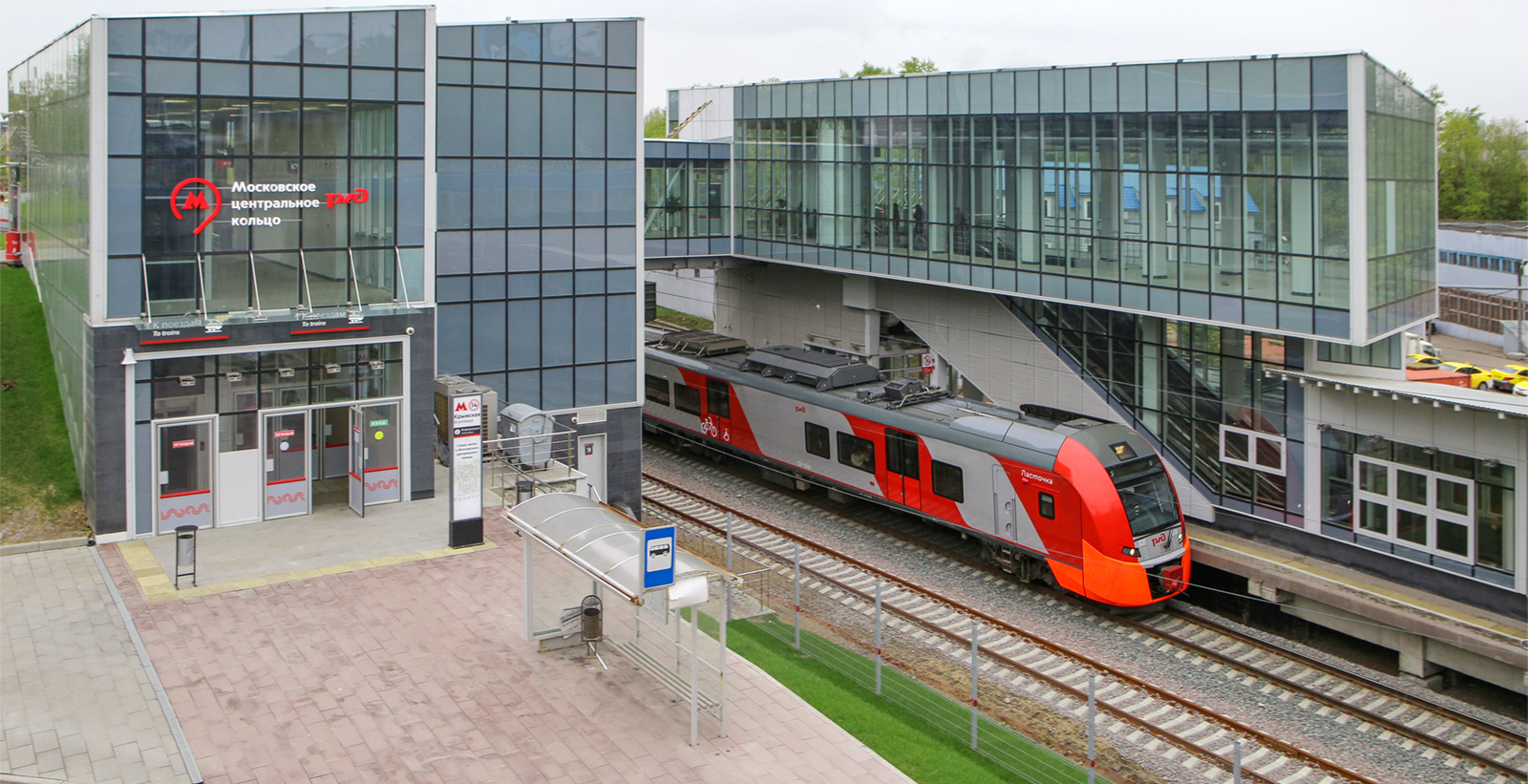
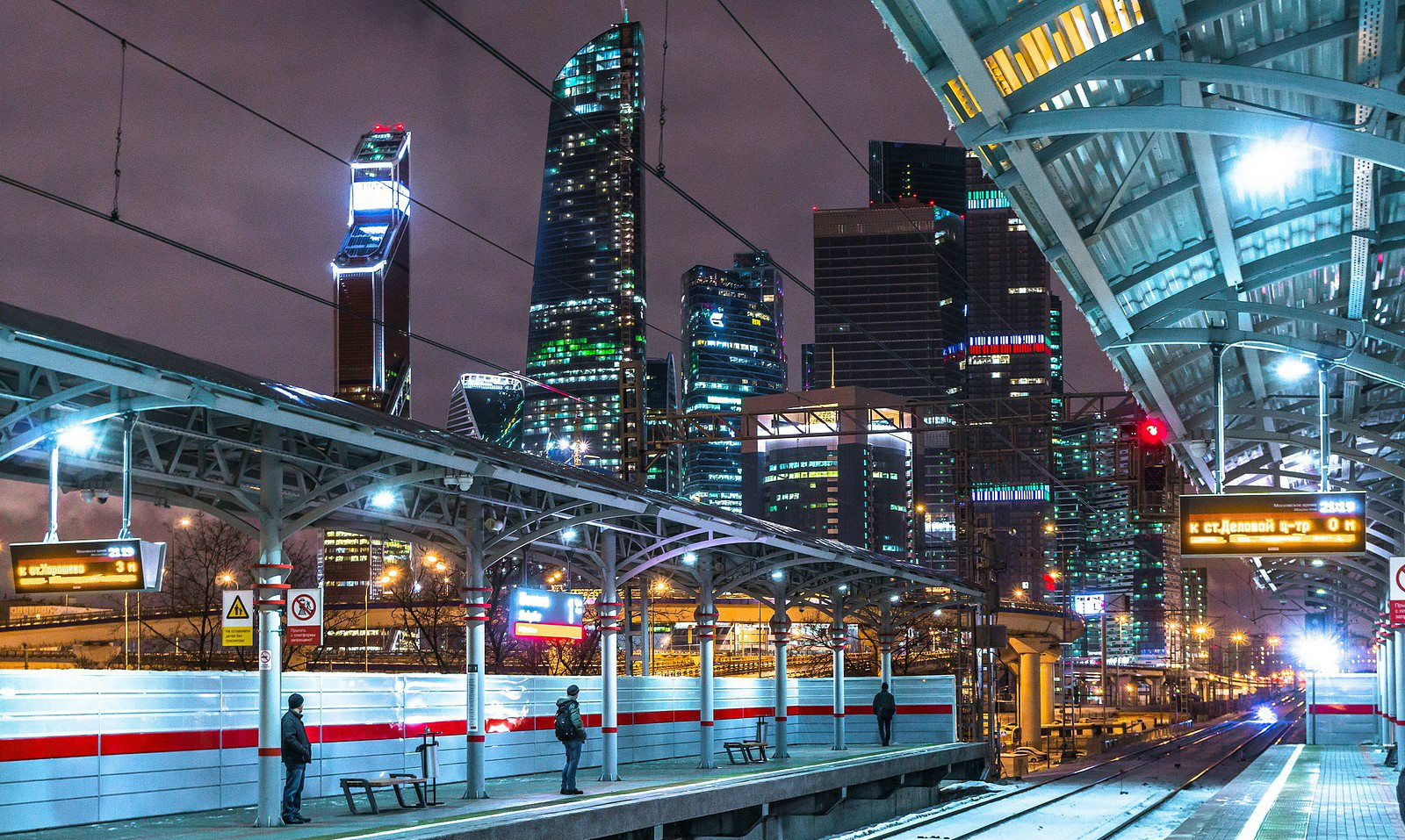
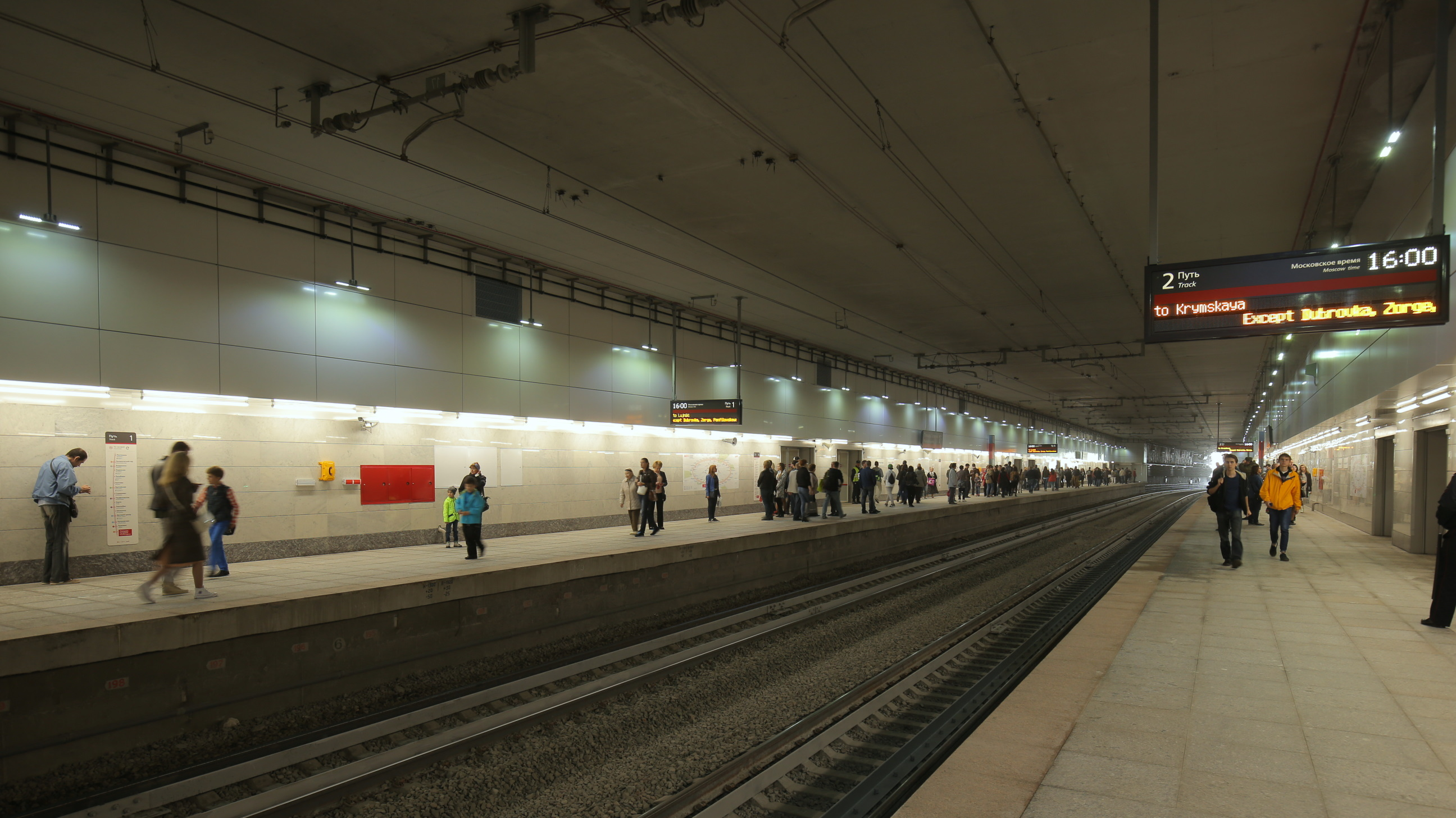
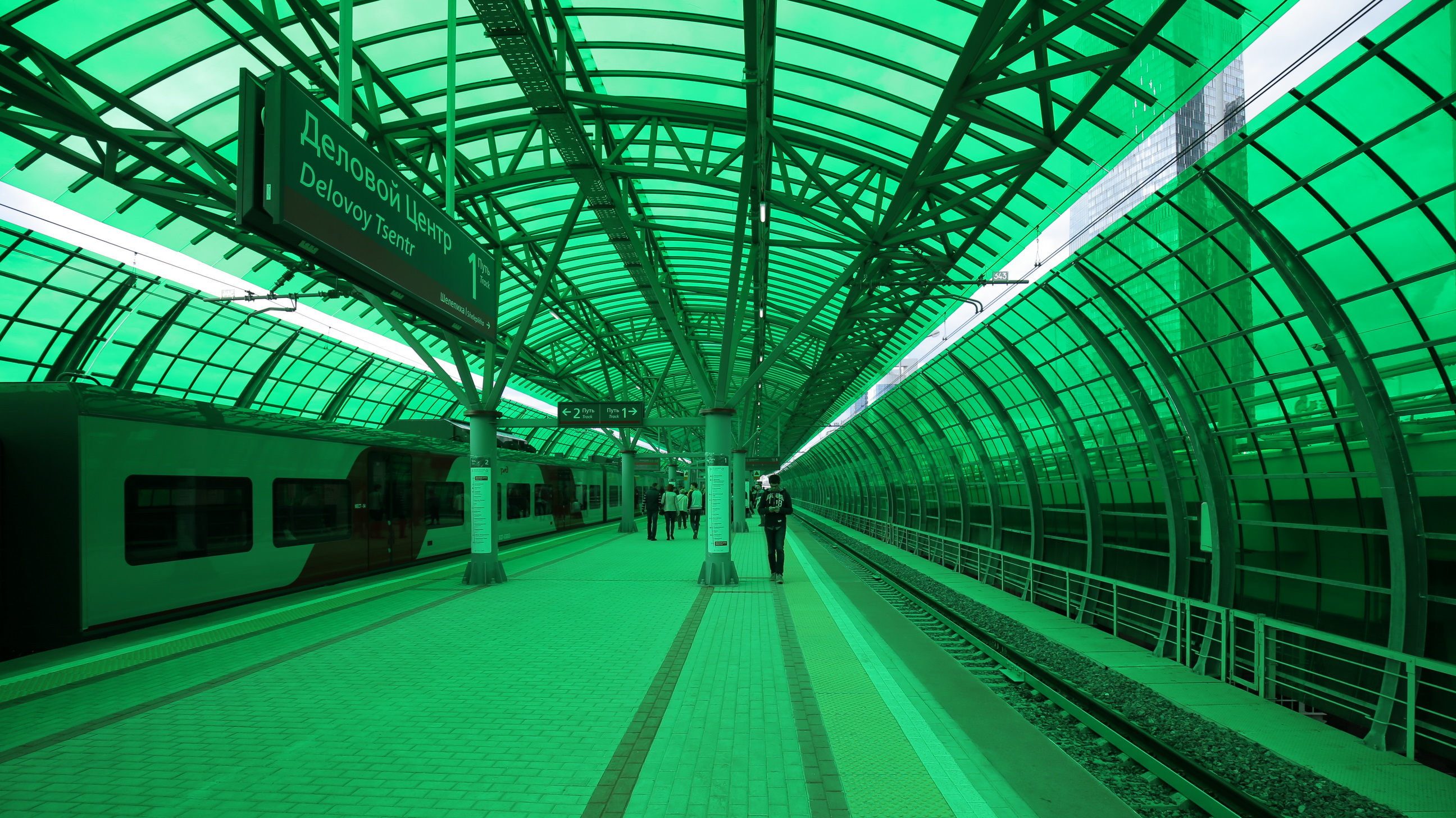
- Clockwise from top: Luzhniki station, Shelepikha station, Moskva-City station, Ploshchad Gagarina station, Krymskaya station

Overview
- Other name(s): MCC, МЦК, Окружная ЖД, 14 линия
- Native name: Московское центральное кольцо
- Owner: Russian Railways (track infrastructure and operation); MKZD (stations)
- Locale: Moscow
- Stations: 31; 1 underground 3 elevated 27 surface

Service
- Type: Heavy rail, rapid transit
- System: Moscow Metro
- Operator(s): Russian Railways; Moscow Metro (client)
- Rolling stock: Siemens ES2G Lastochka
- Daily ridership: 460,000

History
- Opened: 10 September 2016; 9 years ago

Technical
- Line length: 54 km (34 mi)
- Character: Aboveground, surface, partially underground
- Track gauge: 1,520 mm (4 ft 11 27/32 in)
- Electrification: 3 kV DC overhead line
- Operating speed: 37 km/h (23 mph) (average); 110 km/h (68 mph) (maximum)

Geographical map of Moscow Metro with Central Circle colored in red line, the rest is colored in dark gray.

The Moscow Central Circle or MCC (Russian: Московское центральное кольцо, МЦК), (Line 14) and marked in a strawberry red/white color is a 54-kilometre-long (34 mi) orbital urban/metropolitan rail line that encircles historical Moscow. The line is rebuilt from the Little Ring of the Moscow Railway (MKZD), opened to passengers on 10 September 2016 and is operated by the Moscow Government owned company MKZD through the Moscow Metro, with the state-run Russian Railways selected as the operation subcontractor. The infrastructure, tracks and platforms are owned and managed by Russian Railways, while most station buildings are owned by MKZD.

== History ==
The railroad was commissioned in 1897 under the auspices of Emperor Nicholas II, thus earning a "Royal Railroad" nickname. The planning took five years. Thirteen design alternatives were reviewed in the process. The winning bid was for a four-track rail line, with two tracks allocated for freight, and the other two used by passenger trains. The project came with an estimated 40 million ruble price tag.

In May 1902, construction began. Following a defeat in the 1905 Russo-Japanese War, construction was scaled back. As the costs overran the estimate by a third, the number of tracks being built was reduced to two. Bridges, of which there are 35 (4 big and 31 small), were particularly costly. Their low clearance hindered electrification efforts for over a century to come. The vast railroad infrastructure included housing facilities, water towers, smithies, and miscellaneous shops. Station houses — architectural masterpieces built in the typical early-20th-century Russian industrial style — had electricity. Heat was provided by masonry heaters, some of which were Russian-made, and some imported from Holland. Station clocks were purchased from Swiss manufacturer Paul Buhré. Known for their accuracy, these clocks, for a while, became the city's de facto time standard.

- Only one such clock has survived. It is located in Presnya station supervisor's office.

The first train ran in 1907. On 19 July 1908, the railroad officially opened. The opening ceremony was attended by the Czar, Royal Dynasty members, and government and city officials.

In the first few months, the railroad was used exclusively for passenger traffic. Due to a high train fare — at 3.40 rubles — ridership was virtually non-existent, and the line brought in the total of 132 rubles in revenue since the operation started. Thus, on 10 October 1908, passenger trains were discontinued in favor of freight service.

Between World War I and the October Revolution of 1917, the passenger service was restored, although freight remained the only viable revenue source. By the late 1920s, other forms of public transportation had emerged and in 1934, passenger service was ended — a year before the introduction of Moscow Metro. The break from passenger use took almost a century — it took over 80 years of Moscow's growth and development to reintroduce the railroad to its initial role.

== Development ==
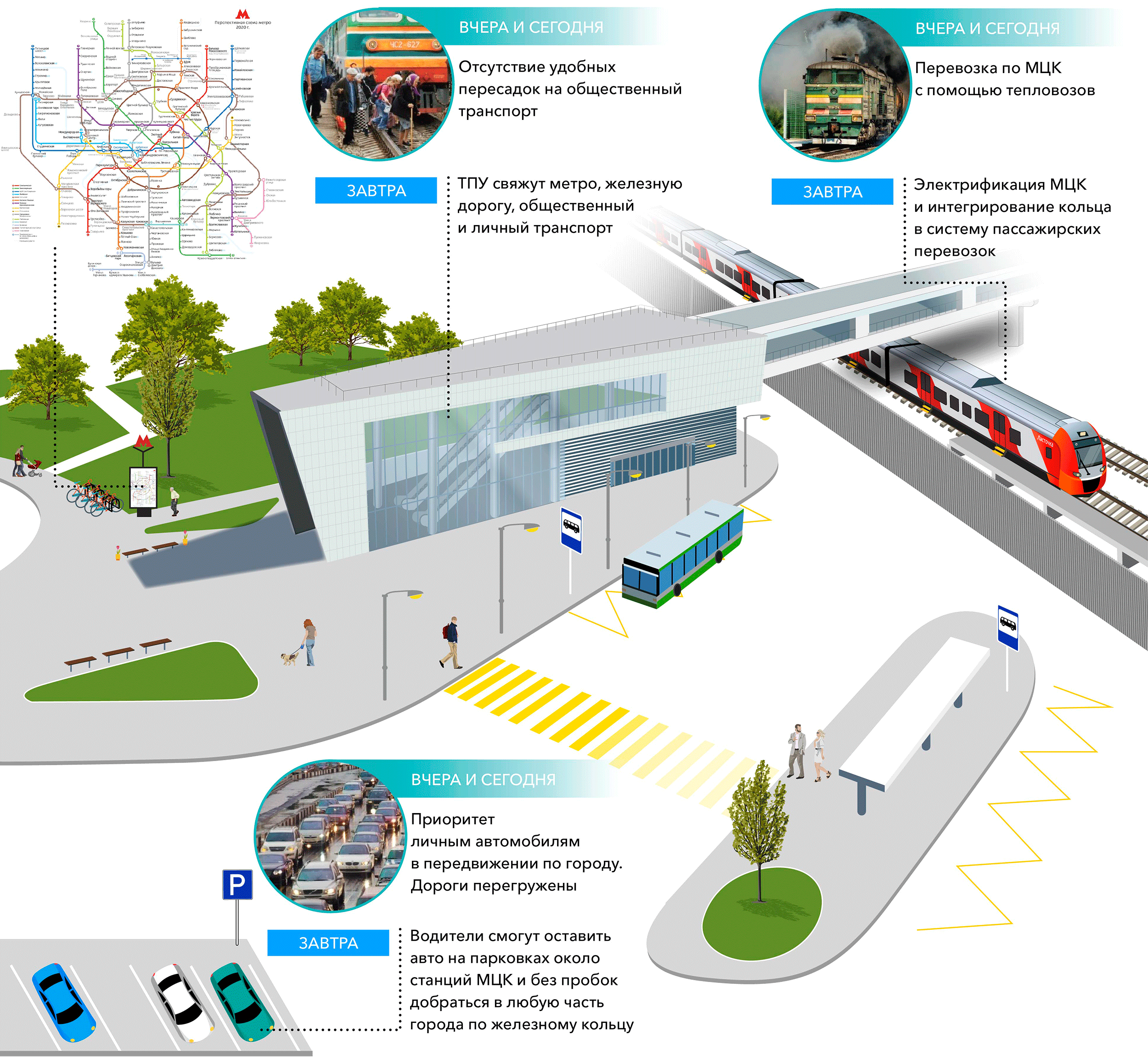
Example of a transport hub on the Moscow Central Circle

Around 2010, many millions of people used the city's subway system daily. Some 35-40% used private transportation, leading to severe road congestion.

Upgrade plans for the railway line were signed by Russian Railways and the Moscow Government between 2008 and 2011 with consent of Vladimir Putin (Prime Minister at the time). Construction work planned for 2013–2016 would convert the Little Ring line of the Moscow Railway for joint passenger and freight use but in 2012, at a meeting with new Prime Minister Dmitry Medvedev in Odintsovo, Moscow Mayor Sergey Sobyanin acknowledged that trains on the circle railway would not be fully ready until 2020. The required work included:

- Electrification of the whole line with 3 kV DC overhead wires and the construction of substations
- Complete track replacement with additional third track on the northern half of the circle
- Construction of new passenger stations and rehabilitation of old yards
- Construction of Podmoskovnaya depot for EMU trains
- Construction of an additional second track and station upgrades on the northern section of the Greater Ring of the Moscow Railway (a large orbital line outside the city), for re-routing freight traffic away from central Moscow
- Replacement for most bridges and overpasses
- New rolling stock specifically designed for urban service
- Construction of transfers with existing and under construction Moscow Metro stations

Construction commenced in 2012, and passenger services began in the third quarter of 2016. During the reconstruction of the railway, many of the original passenger stations were re-purposed for passenger use and complemented with new stations.

== Opening and operation ==
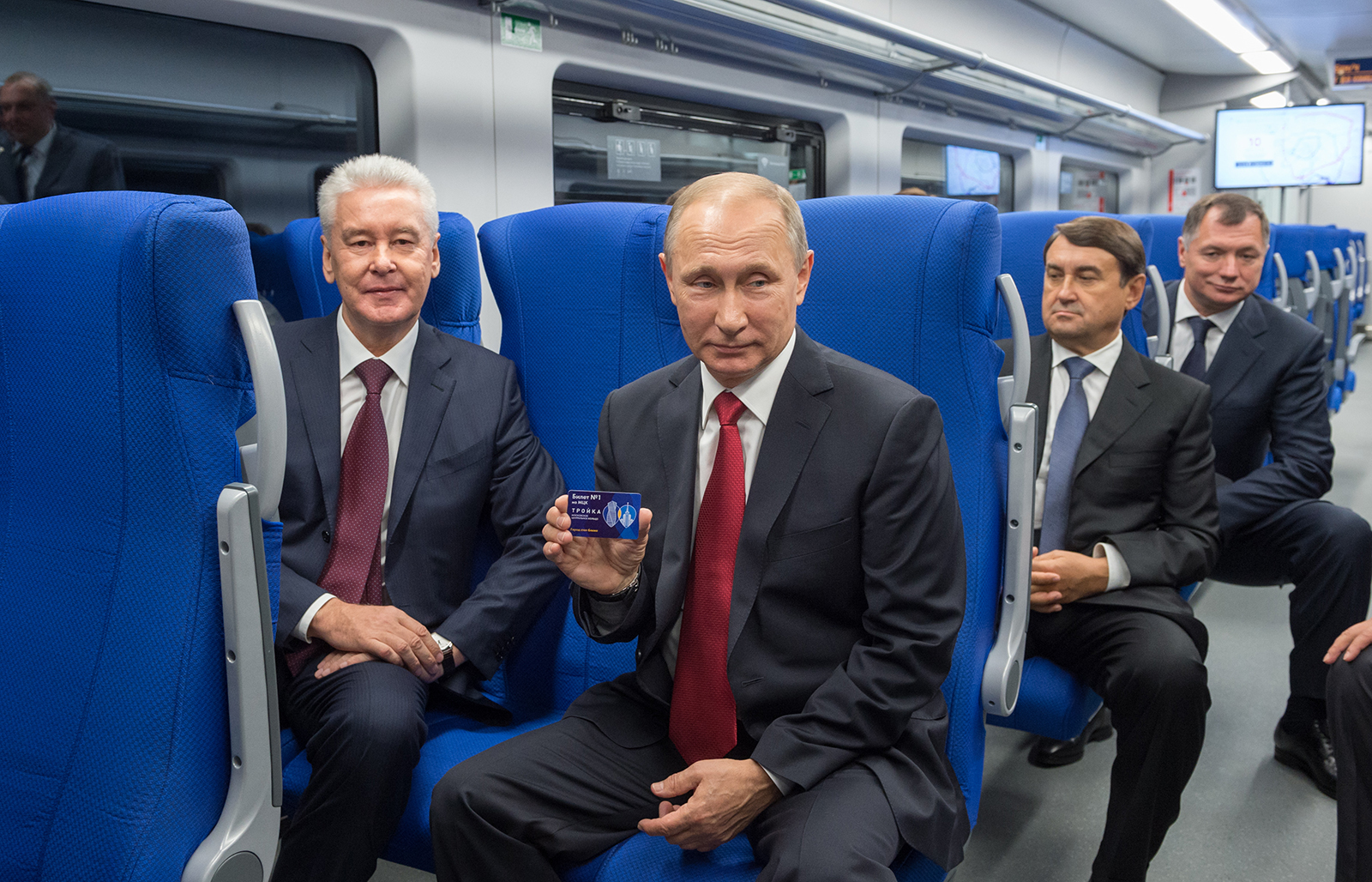
Mayor of Moscow Sergey Sobyanin and President Vladimir Putin on the opening day of the MCC.

The line opened on 10 September 2016 in the presence of President Vladimir Putin and Moscow Mayor Sergey Sobyanin. The line was free to ride for the first month of operation. By the end of 2016, the daily ridership on the Central Circle Line was expected to reach 400,000 and by 2025, the ring railway is expected to carry up to 300 million passengers annually.

The operation of the Central Circle is similar to the S-Train systems in Germany and other countries. Ticketing on the Moscow Central Circle is fully integrated with the Moscow Metro; the same payment cards (such as the Troika card) can be used on both systems, and free transfers are possible within 90 minutes since the first entry into the system, in a way similar to the transfers between the Metro proper and the Moscow Monorail. The line serves the purpose of a connector between the different radial lines of outer Moscow, much as the Koltsevaya Line does in inner Moscow. 130 trains per day circulate around the line, with an interval of 5–6 minutes during the rush hours, and 10–15 minutes at other times. The line's hours of operation are the same as the rest of the Metro, from 06:00 until 01:00. The time for one orbital ride is around 87 minutes.

Despite its name, the Moscow Central Circle is not perfectly circle-shaped. The line stretches 12 kilometres (7.5 mi) outward in the north and draws as close as 5 kilometres (3.1 mi) to the Kremlin in the south. Its connected to Rokossovsky Boulevard metro station, northern end of Line 1; yet it's also connected to Sportivnaya metro station of Line 1 on the south - which is closer to Kremlin than Line 1's Vorobyovy Gory metro station situated on Moscow river.

- Another circle line, Bolshaya Koltsevaya line (an extension of Line 11/Kakhovskaya Line) stretches to the south instead.

It was estimated 1,5 million people lived near the line in the early 21st century.

Evening trip on the ES2G train. Short review of train interiors and three stations — Okruzhnaya, Delovoy Tsentr and Luzhniki

Full trip on the line (clockwise direction). Views of inner side. On the preview the Andronovka yard is shown

Arrival and departure of ES2G trains at Okruzhnaya Station

== Stations ==
The Central Circle Line has 31 stations.

The line working hours are over 1,5 hours shorter than other lines. First trains leaving terminal stations between 5:45 and 5:55. Last trains coming to terminal stations between 1:00 and 1:15. Headways are 4 minutes in pre, peak and post-peak hours and 8 minutes in early day, midday and late day.

Direct transfers to other lines marked with icon, representing a passenger interchanging under a roof. Walking distance is given for free out-of-station transfers. Free transfer between MCC and metro stations requires the first rail journey before transfer to be done within 88 minutes.

All trains stop on all stations.

Station Name		Distance (km)		Transfers	Notes
English	Russian	Between stations	Total	Transfers	Notes
↑ Loop line towards Likhobory ↑
Okruzhnaya	Окружная	1.3 ↑	54.0 ↑	Okruzhnaya; Okruzhnaya	
Vladykino	Владыкино	1.4	1.4	Vladykino	
Botanichesky Sad	Ботанический сад	2.9	4.3	Botanichesky Sad (230 m)	
Rostokino	Ростокино	1.8	6.1		
Belokamennaya	Белокаменная	2.6	8.7		
Bulvar Rokossovskogo	Бульвар Рокоссовского	2.6	11.3	Bulvar Rokossovskogo (260 m)	
Lokomotiv	Локомотив	1.6	12.9	Cherkizovskaya	
Izmaylovo	Измайлово	1.6	14.5	Partizanskaya (480 m)	
Sokolinaya Gora	Соколиная Гора	2.1	16.6		
Shosse Entuziastov	Шоссе Энтузиастов	1.4	18.0	Shosse Entuziastov (460 m)	
Andronovka	Андроновка	1.5	19.5	Andronovka	
Nizhegorodskaya	Нижегородская	1.8	21.3	Nizhegorodskaya; Nizhegorodskaya	
Novokhokhlovskaya	Новохохловская	1.1	22.4	Novokhokhlovskaya	
Ugreshskaya	Угрешская	1.4	23.8		
Dubrovka	Дубровка	1.4	25.2	Dubrovka (870 m)	
Avtozavodskaya	Автозаводская	1.2	26.4	Avtozavodskaya (440 m)	
ZIL	ЗИЛ	1.4	27.8	ZIL	
Verkhniye Kotly	Верхние Котлы	2.1	29.9	Nagatinskaya (1040 m)	
Krymskaya	Крымская	0.8	30.7	Krymskaya	
Ploshchad Gagarina	Площадь Гагарина	2.3	33.0	Leninsky Prospekt	
Luzhniki	Лужники	2.3	35.3	Sportivnaya (170 m)	
Kutuzovskaya	Кутузовская	2.7	38.0	Kutuzovskaya; Kutuzovskaya	
Delovoy Tsentr	Деловой центр	0.9	38.9	Testovskaya; Mezhdunarodnaya	
Shelepikha	Шелепиха	1.1	40.0	Shelepikha	
Khoroshyovo	Хорошёво	2.6	42.6	Polezhayevskaya (690 m); Khoroshyovskaya (680 m)	
Zorge	Зорге	1.2	43.8		
Panfilovskaya	Панфиловская	1.3	45.1	Oktyabrskoye Pole (720 m)	
Streshnevo	Стрешнево	1.8	46.9	Streshnevo	
Baltiyskaya	Балтийская	1.6	48.5	Voykovskaya (750 m)	
Koptevo	Коптево	2.1	50.6		
Likhobory	Лихоборы	2.1	52.7	Likhobory	
↓ Loop line towards Okruzhnaya ↓

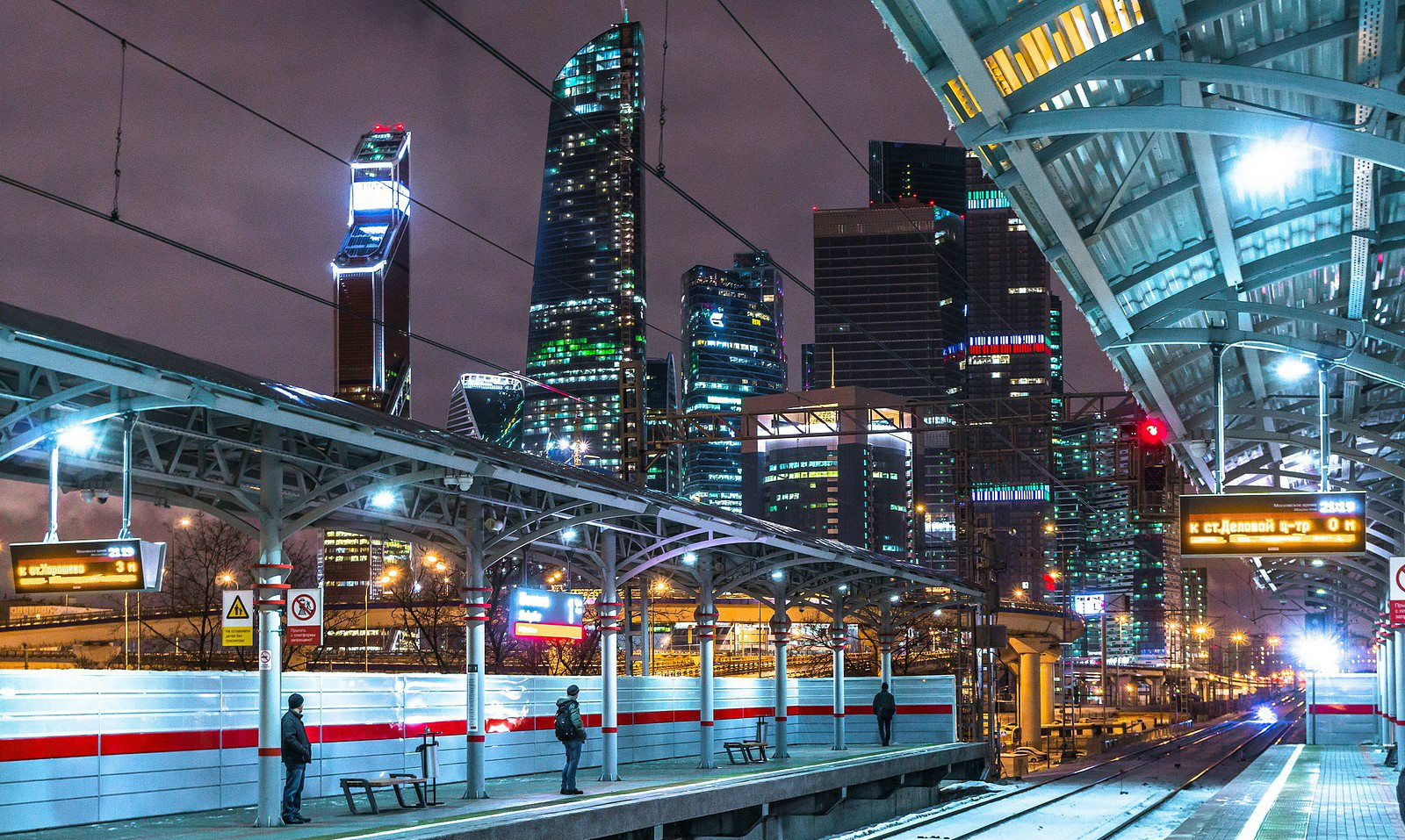
Shelepikha Station

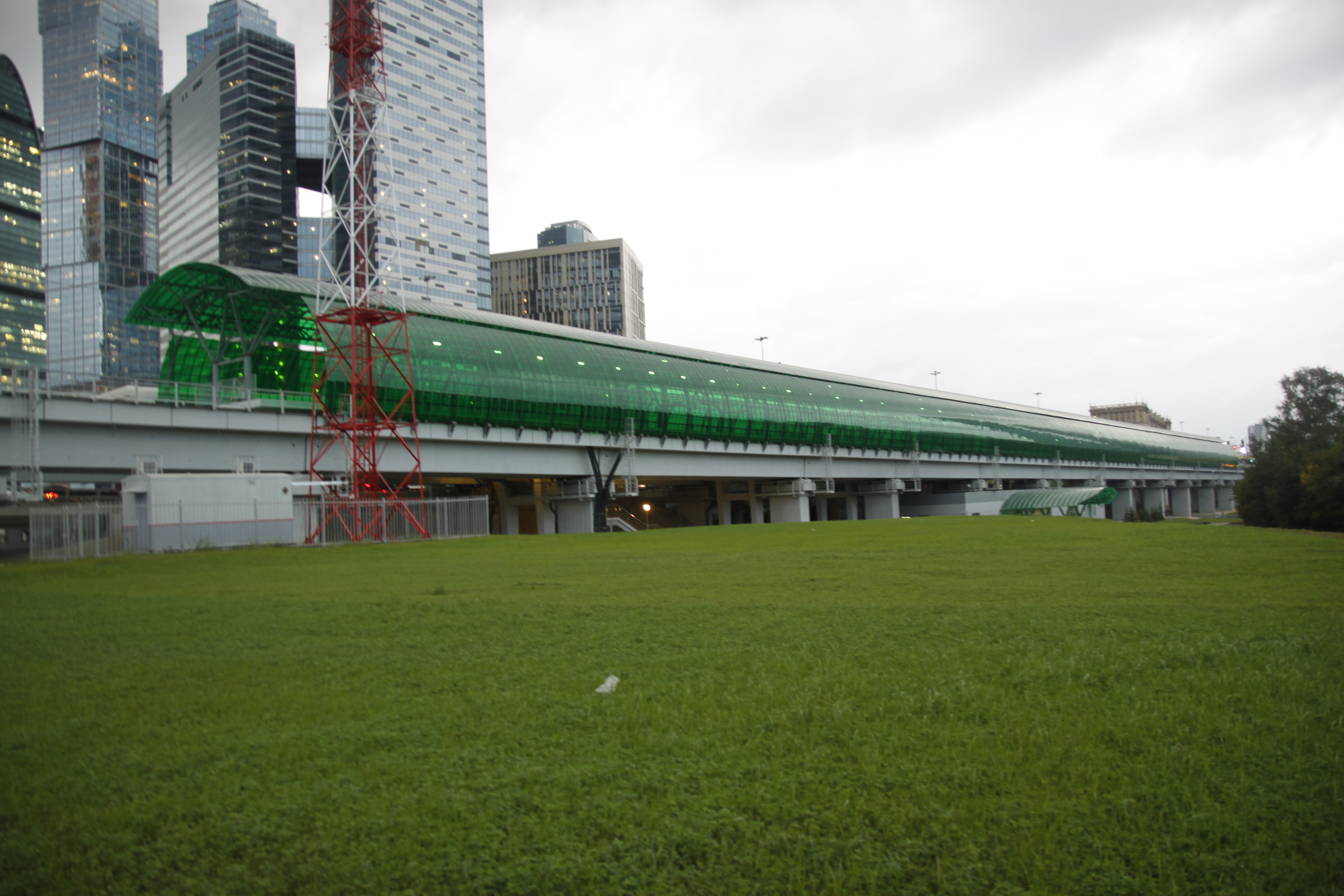
Delovoy Tsentr Station, adjacent to International Business Center

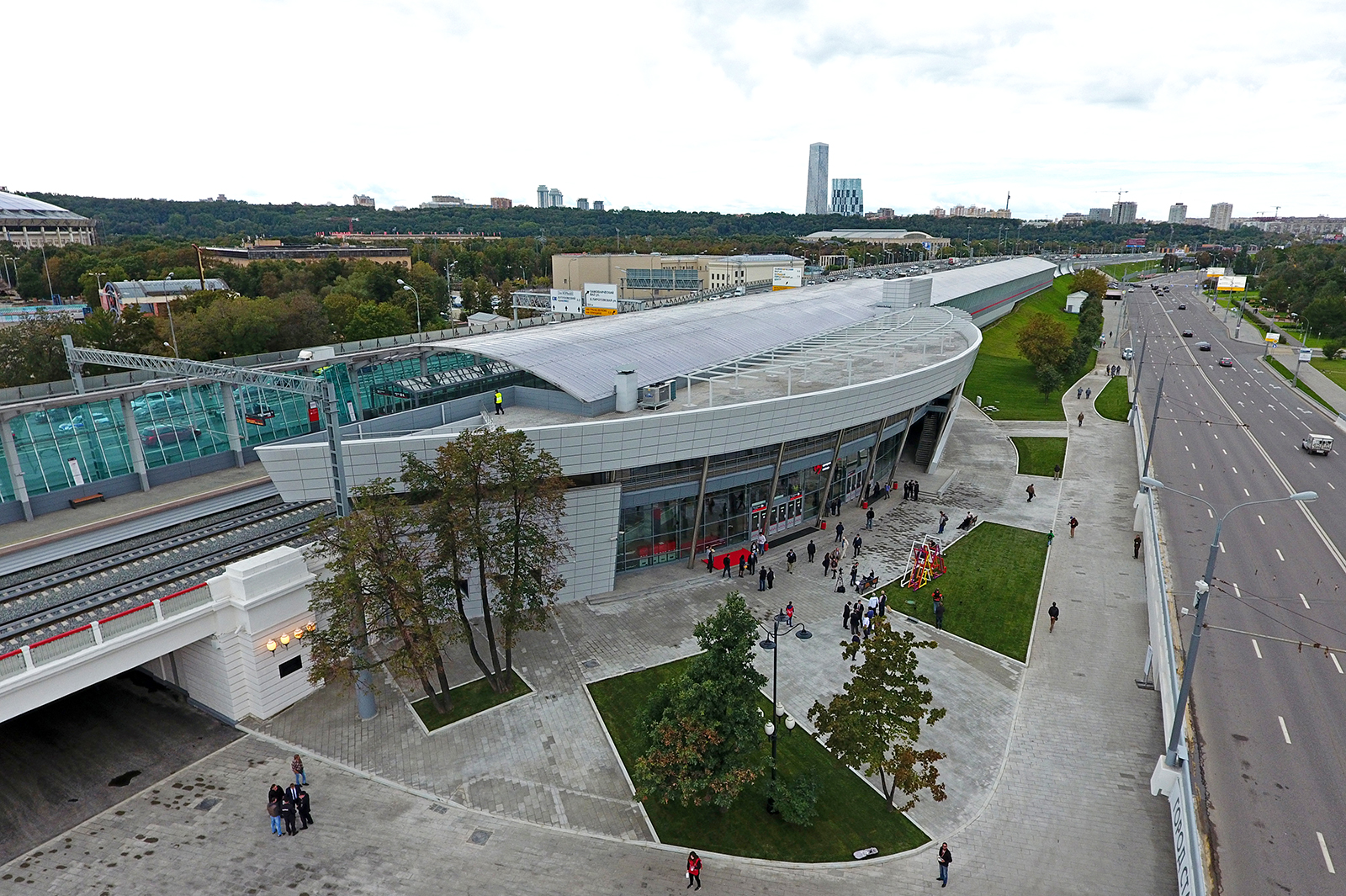
Luzhniki Station

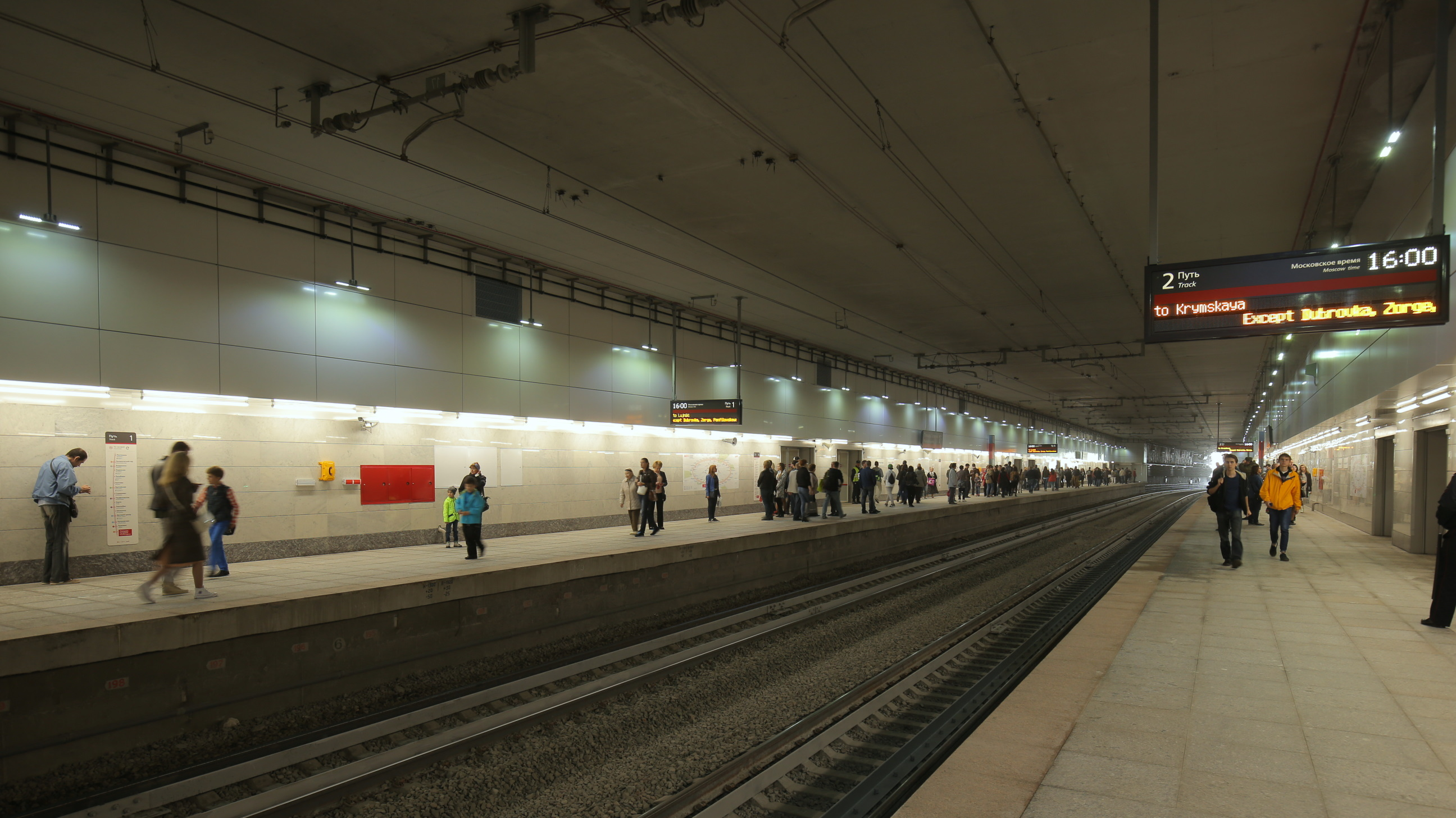
Ploshchad Gagarina Station

== Rolling stock ==
The line is operated by 61 Siemens ES2G Lastochka trains from Podmoskovnaya depot (trains with numbers from 012 to 072). Andronovka, Belokamennaya, Likhobory and Presnya MK MZD yards also serves as depots.

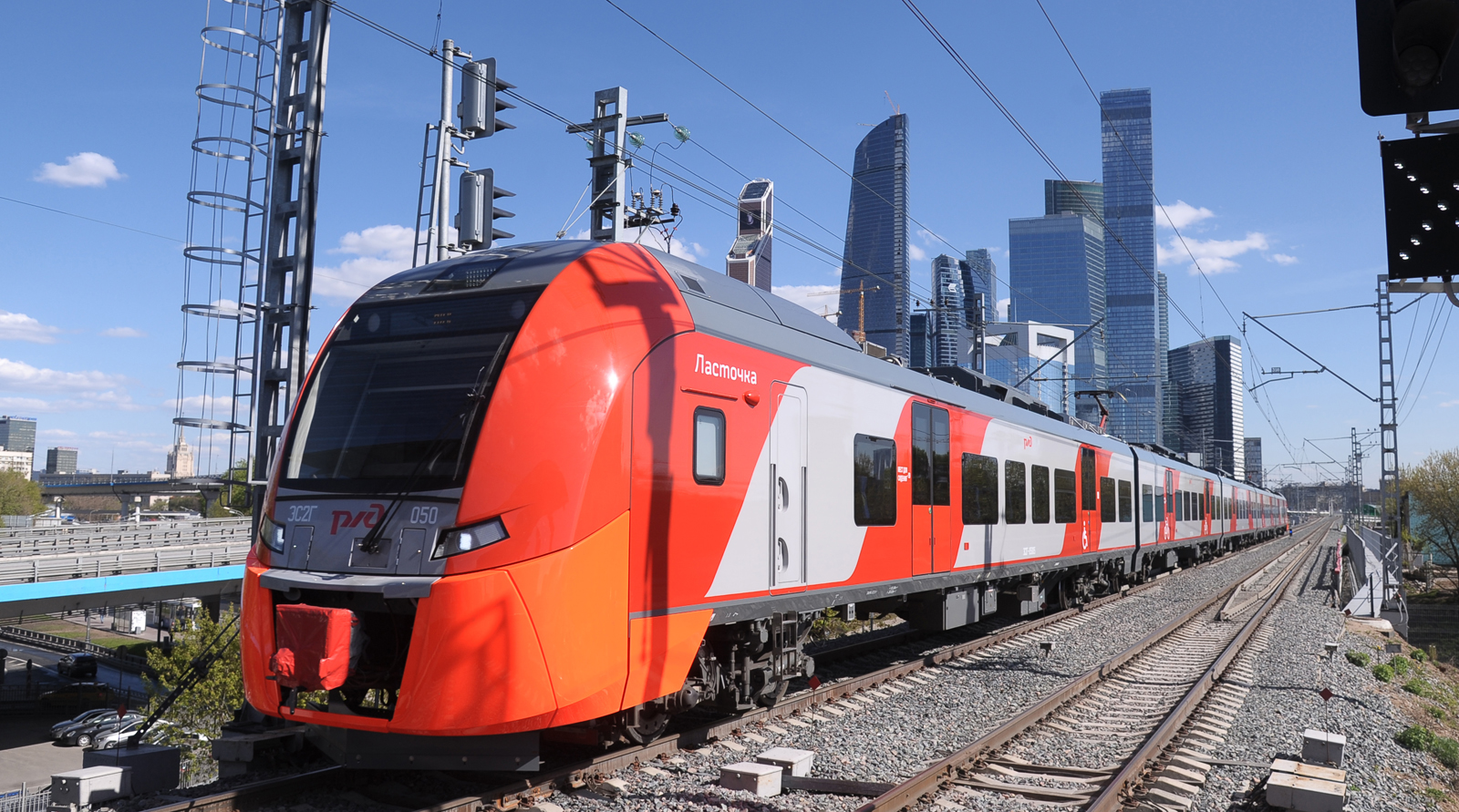
Electric multiple-unit ES2G-050 approaching Shelepikha station

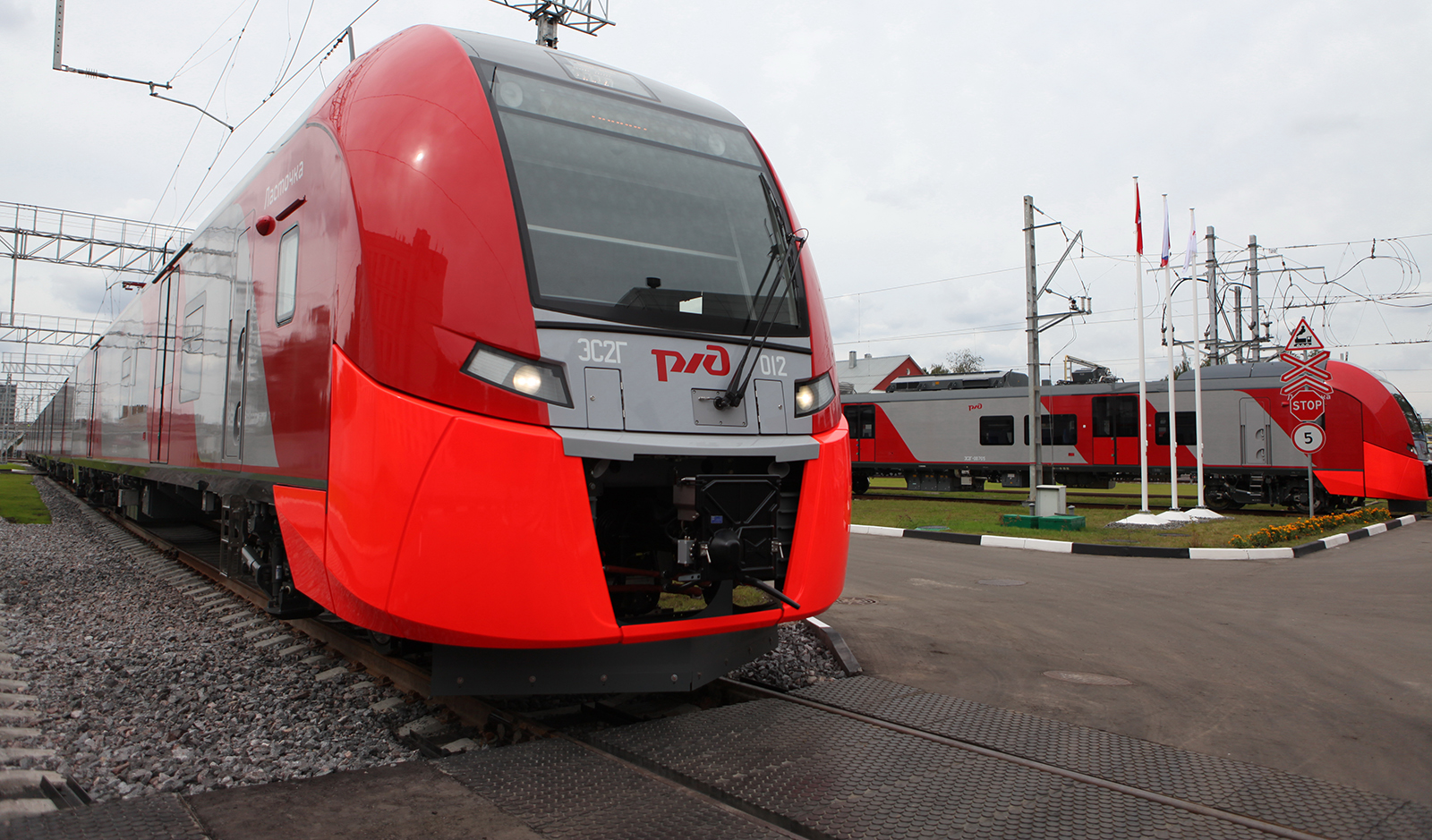
ES2G trains at the depot
