= Okruzhnaya (Moscow Central Circle) =

Station on the Moscow Central Circle

Okruzhnaya Окружная
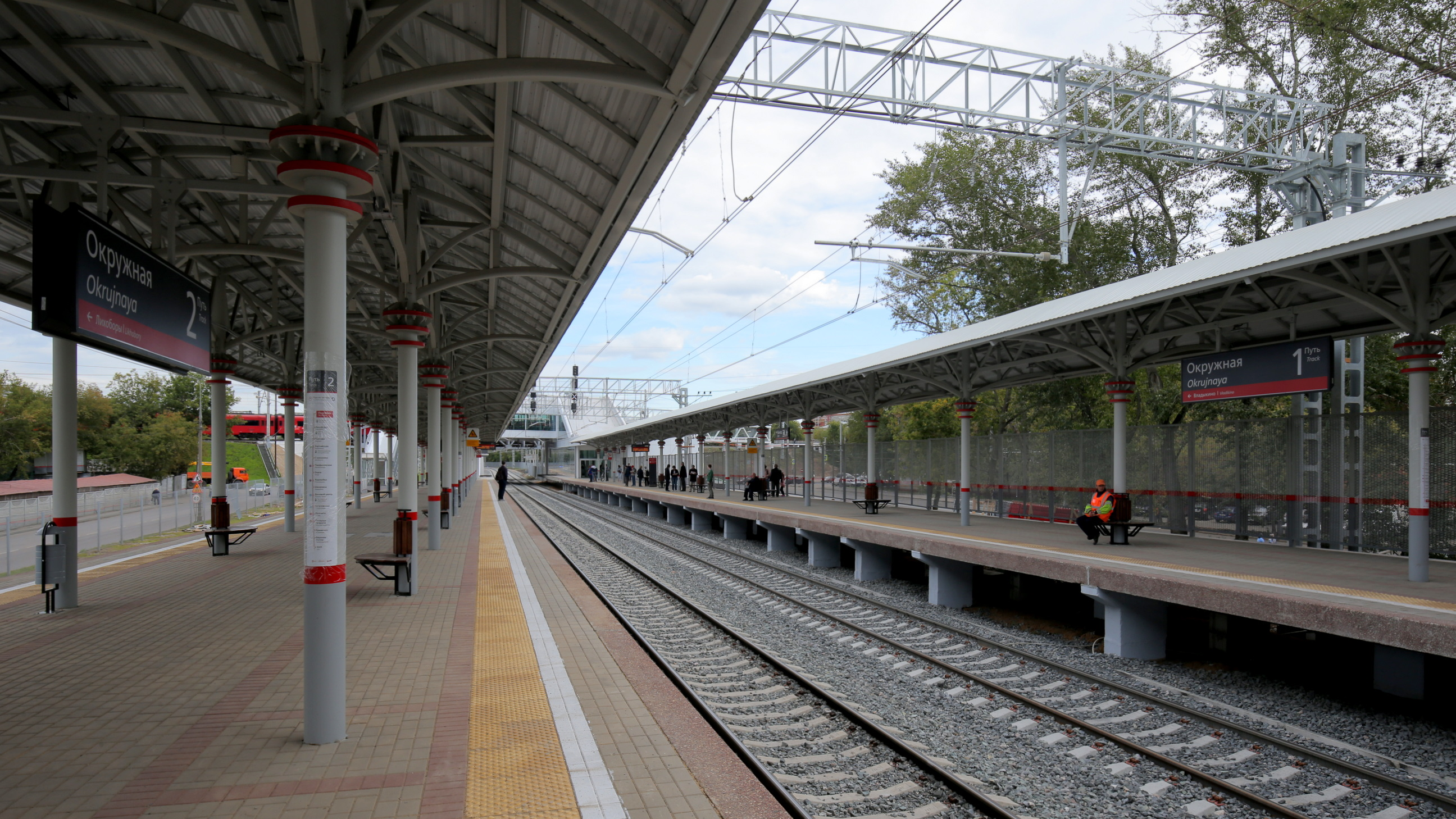

General information
- Location: Marfino District, Timiryazevsky District; Northern/North-Eastern Administrative Okrug; Moscow; Russia
- Coordinates: 55.8489°N 37.5711°E
- System: Moscow Metro
- Operator: Russian Railways
- Line: Moscow Central Circle
- Platforms: 2 side platforms
- Tracks: 2

Construction
- Structure type: At-grade

History
- Opened: 10 September 2016; 9 years ago

Services
Preceding station	Moscow Metro	Following station
Likhobory anticlockwise / outer	Moscow Central Circle	Vladykino clockwise / inner
Out-of-station interchange
Preceding station	Moscow Metro	Following station
Verkhniye Likhobory towards Fiztekh	Lyublinsko-Dmitrovskaya line transfer at Okruzhnaya	Petrovsko-Razumovskaya towards Zyablikovo
Route map
Location
- Location within Moscow Metro

Okruzhnaya (Russian: Окружная - Circle [station]) is a station on the Moscow Central Circle of the Moscow Metro. The station named after the Moscow Circular Railway, the old name of nowaday Moscow Central Circle.

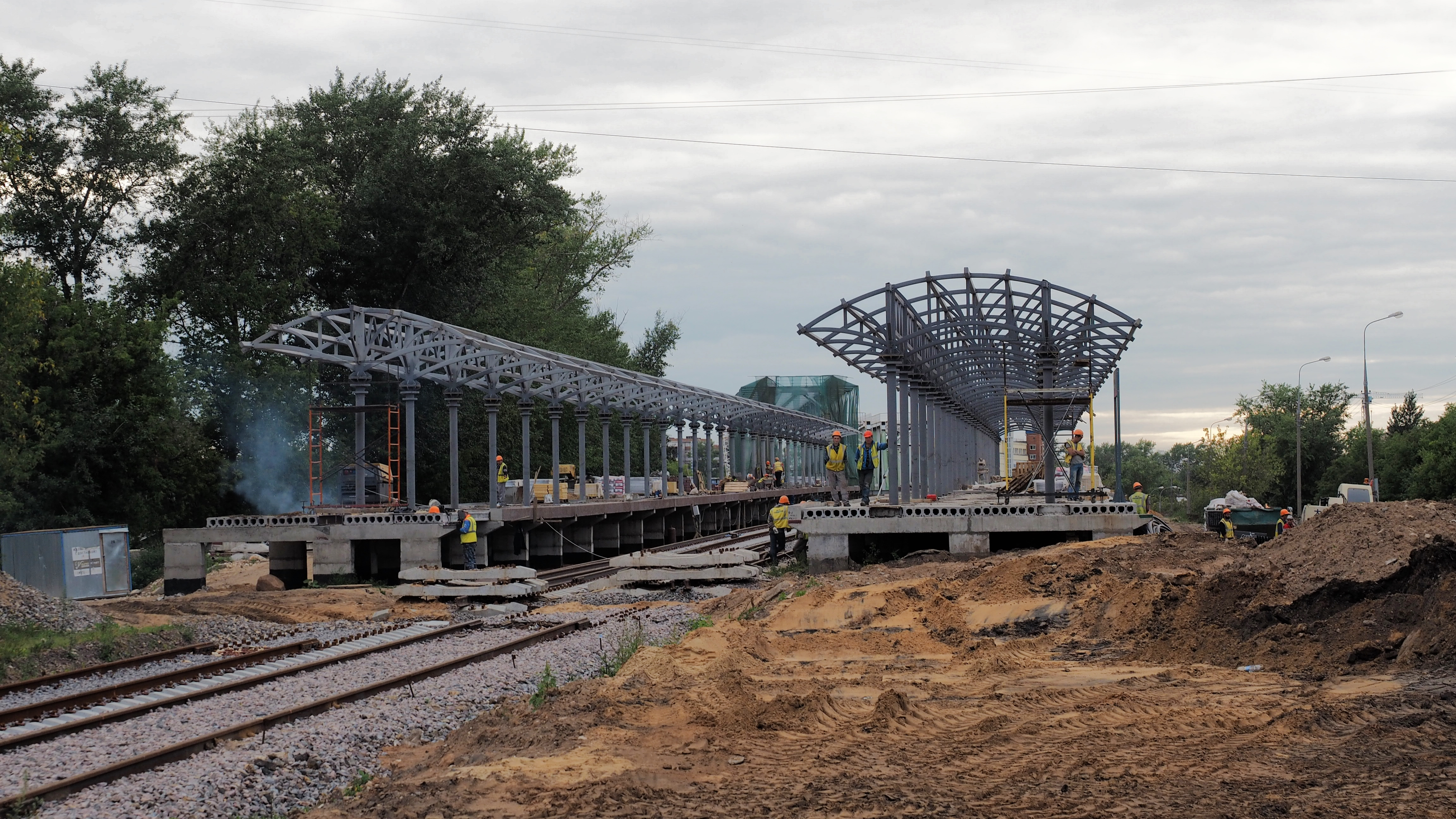
Construction in 2015
