= Vladykino (Moscow Central Circle) =

Station on the Moscow Central Circle

Vladykino Владыкино
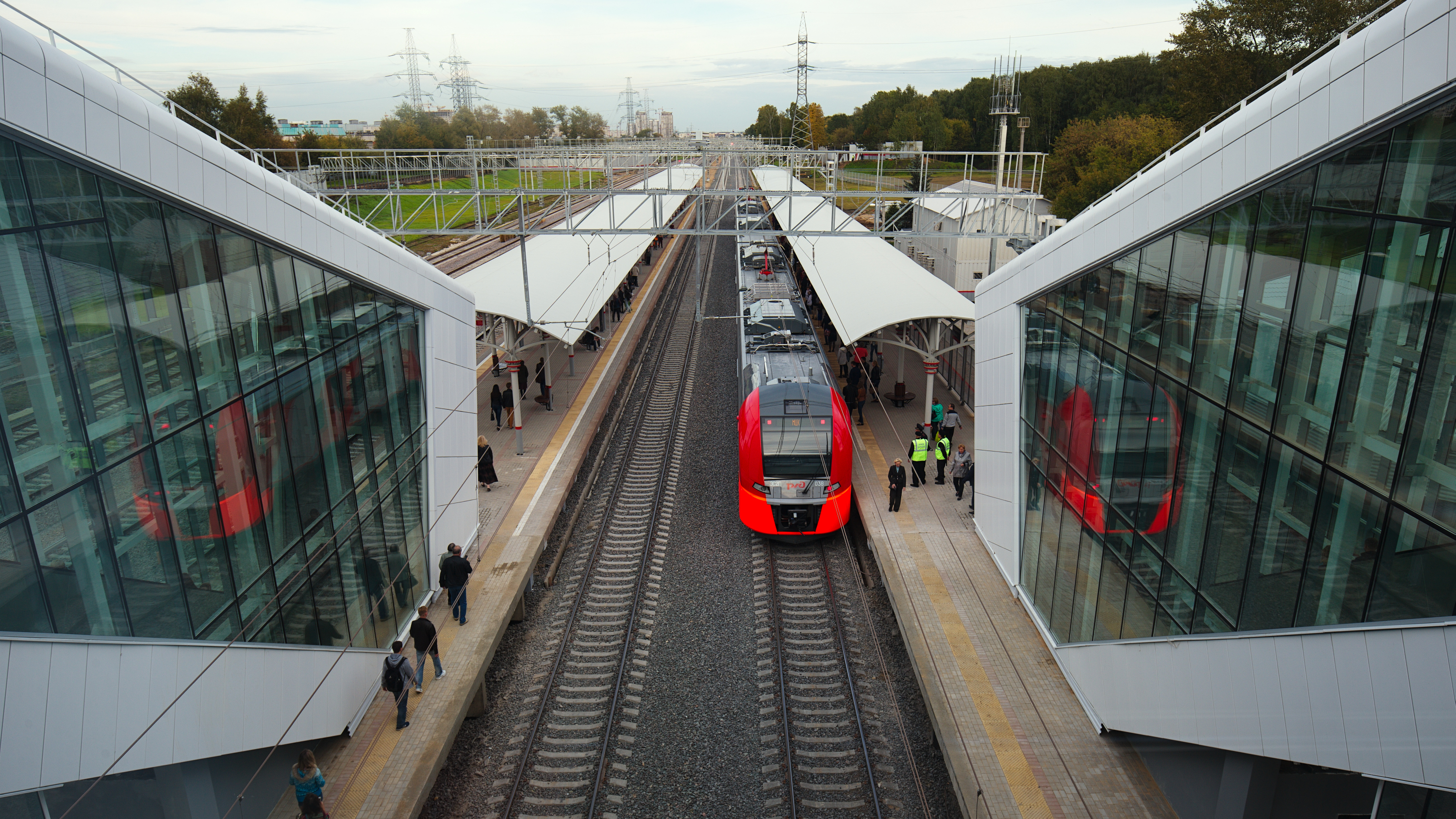

General information
- Location: Otradnoye District, Marfino District; North-Eastern Administrative Okrug; Moscow; Russia
- Coordinates: 55.8474°N 37.5926°E
- System: Moscow Metro
- Owner: Government of Moscow (MKZD)
- Operator: Russian Railways
- Line: Little Ring Railway
- Platforms: 2 (side platforms)
- Tracks: 2
- Train operators: Russian Railways

Construction
- Structure type: At-grade
- Cycle facilities: Yes
- Accessible: Yes

History
- Opened: 10 September 2016; 9 years ago

Services
Preceding station	Moscow Metro	Following station
Okruzhnaya anticlockwise / outer	Moscow Central Circle	Botanichesky Sad clockwise / inner
Out-of-station interchange
Preceding station	Moscow Metro	Following station
Otradnoye towards Altufyevo	Serpukhovsko-Timiryazevskaya line transfer at Vladykino	Petrovsko-Razumovskaya towards Bulvar Dmitriya Donskogo
Location
- Location within Moscow Metro

Vladykino (Russian: Владыкино) is a station on the Little Ring of the Moscow Railway located at Otradnoye District and Marfino District, North-Eastern Administrative Okrug, Moscow. The station is served by Moscow Central Circle of the Moscow Metro.

== Transfer ==
The station offers a transfer for Vladykino of Serpukhovsko-Timiryazevskaya Line.

== Gallery ==
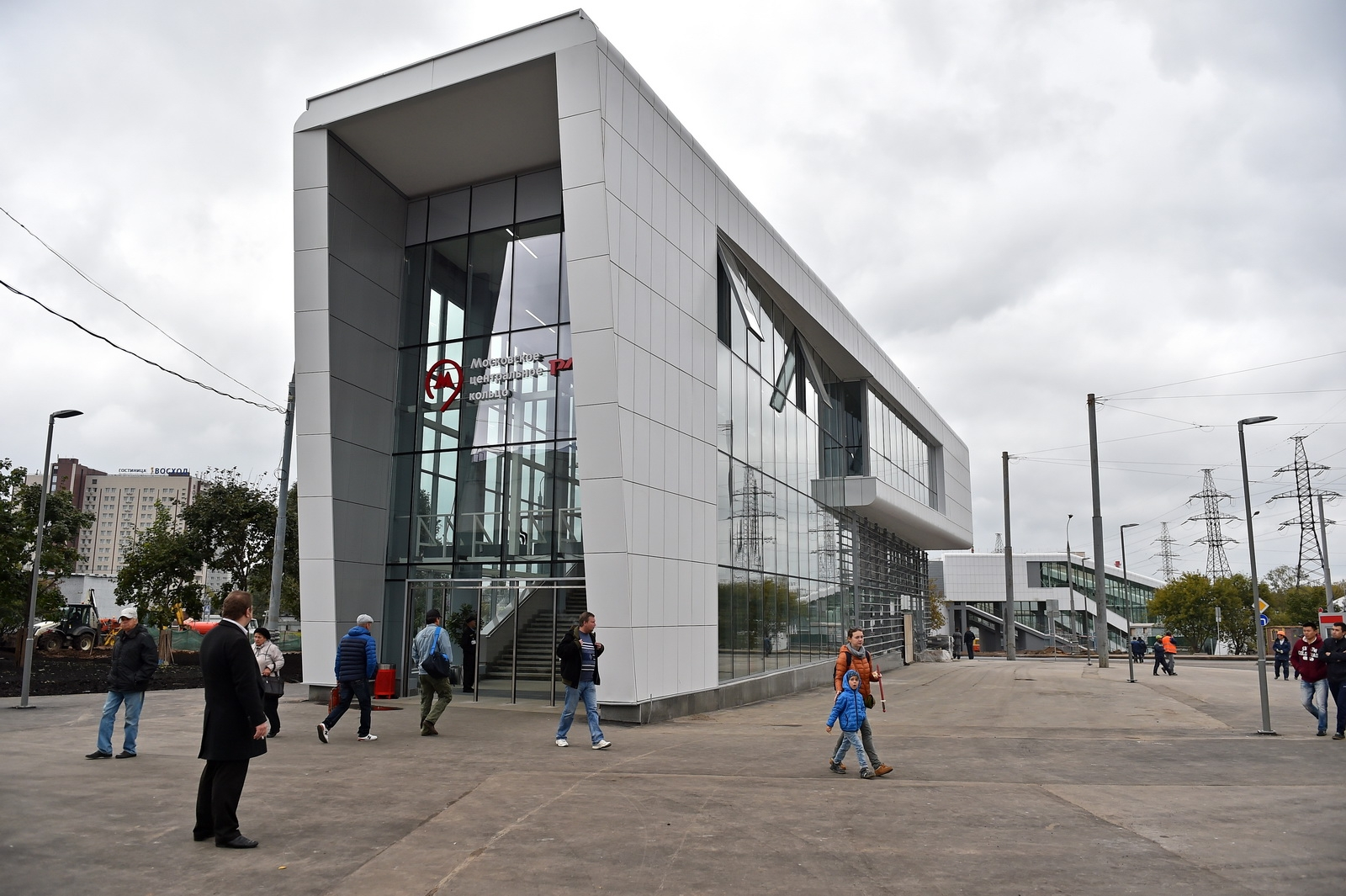

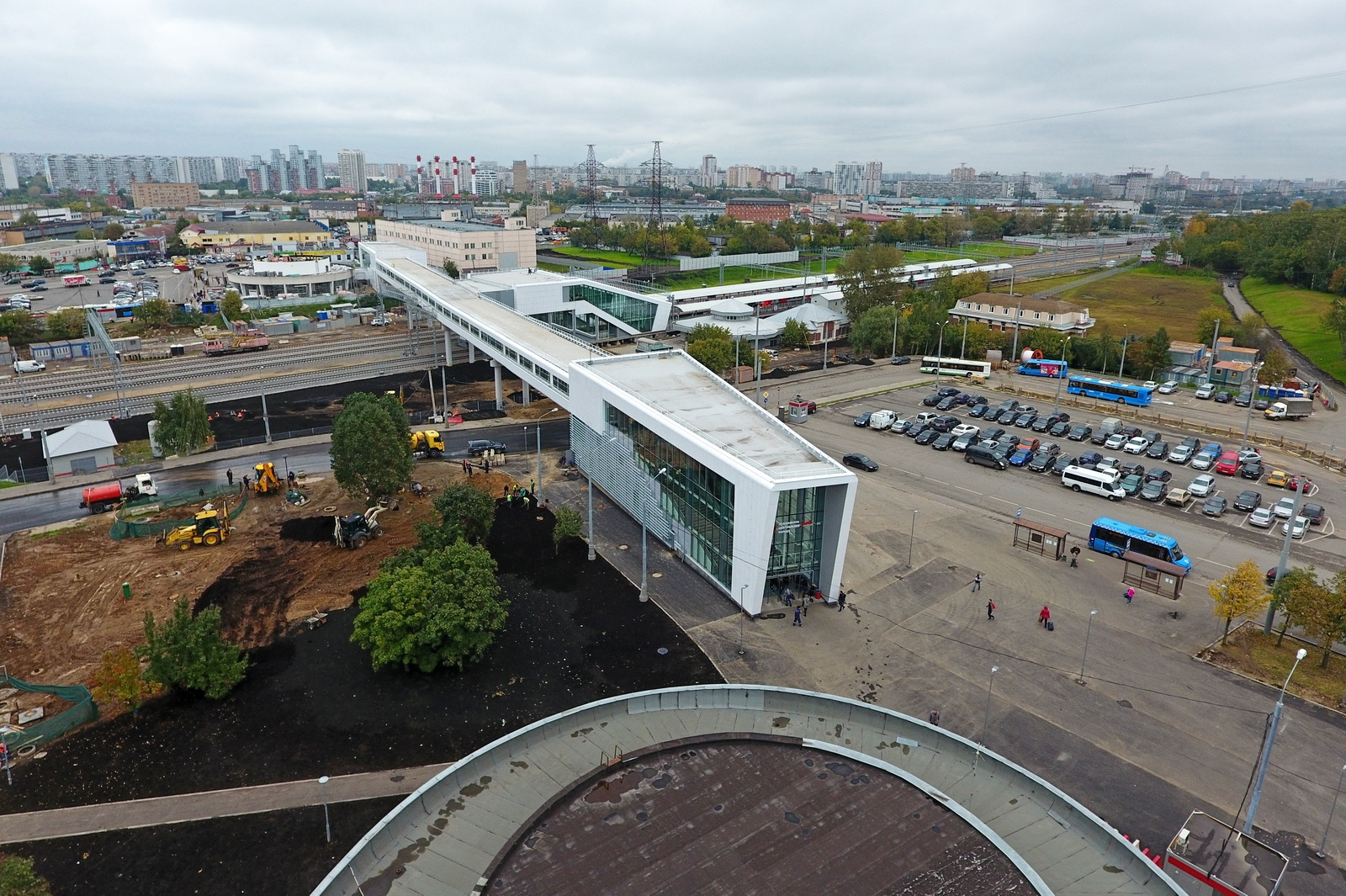

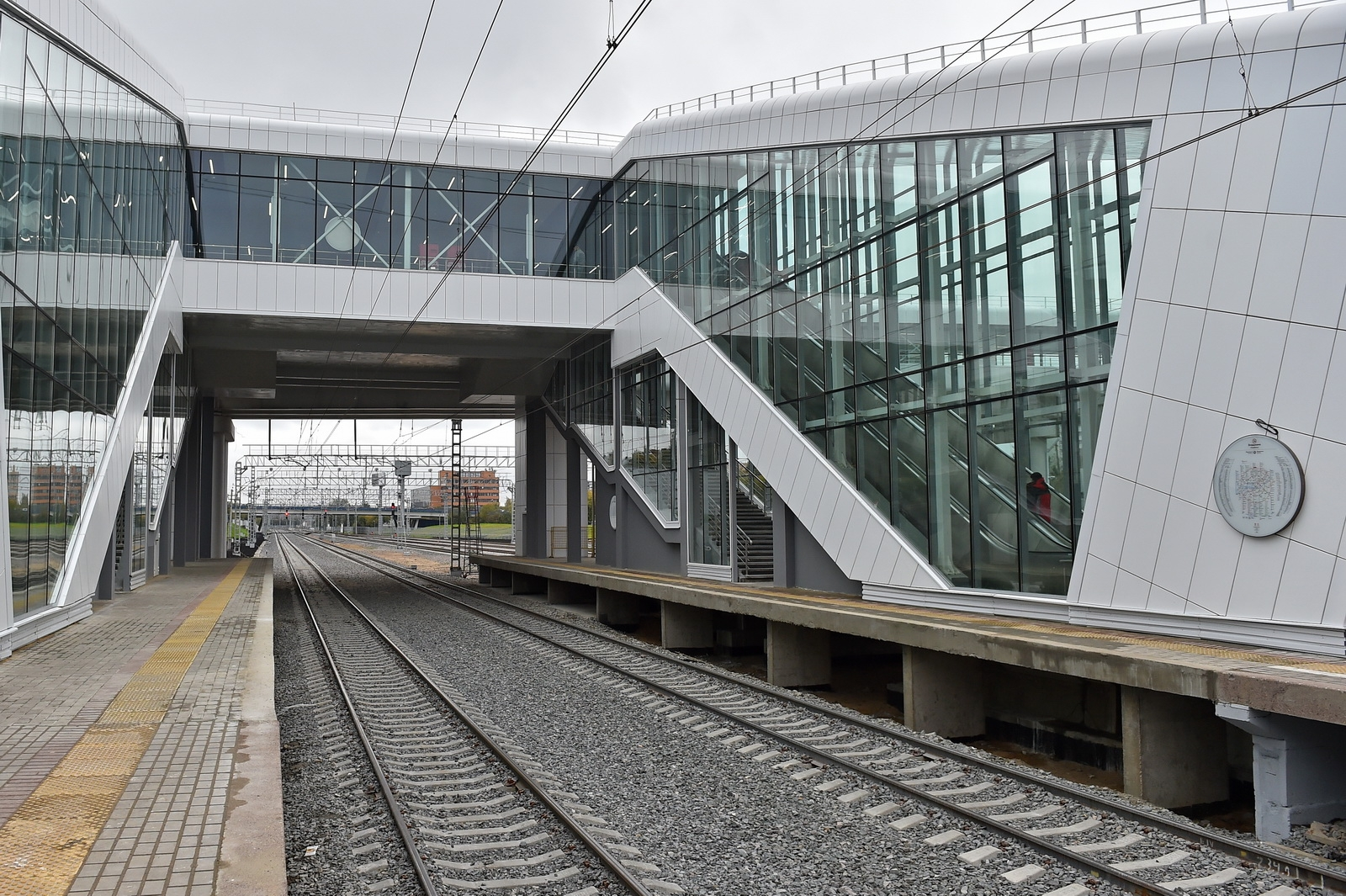

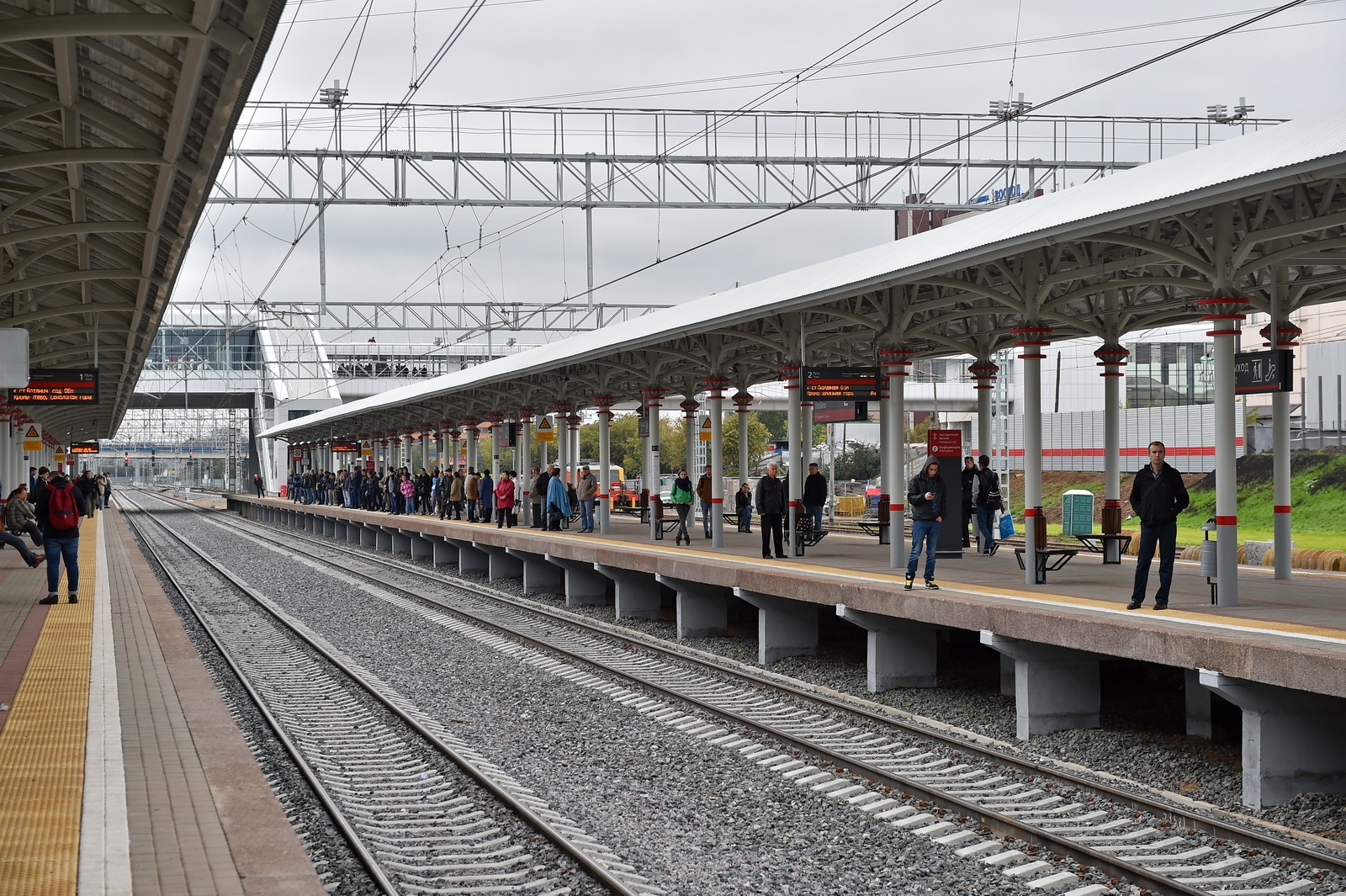
