= Koptevo (Moscow Central Circle) =

Station on the Moscow Central Circle

Koptevo Коптево
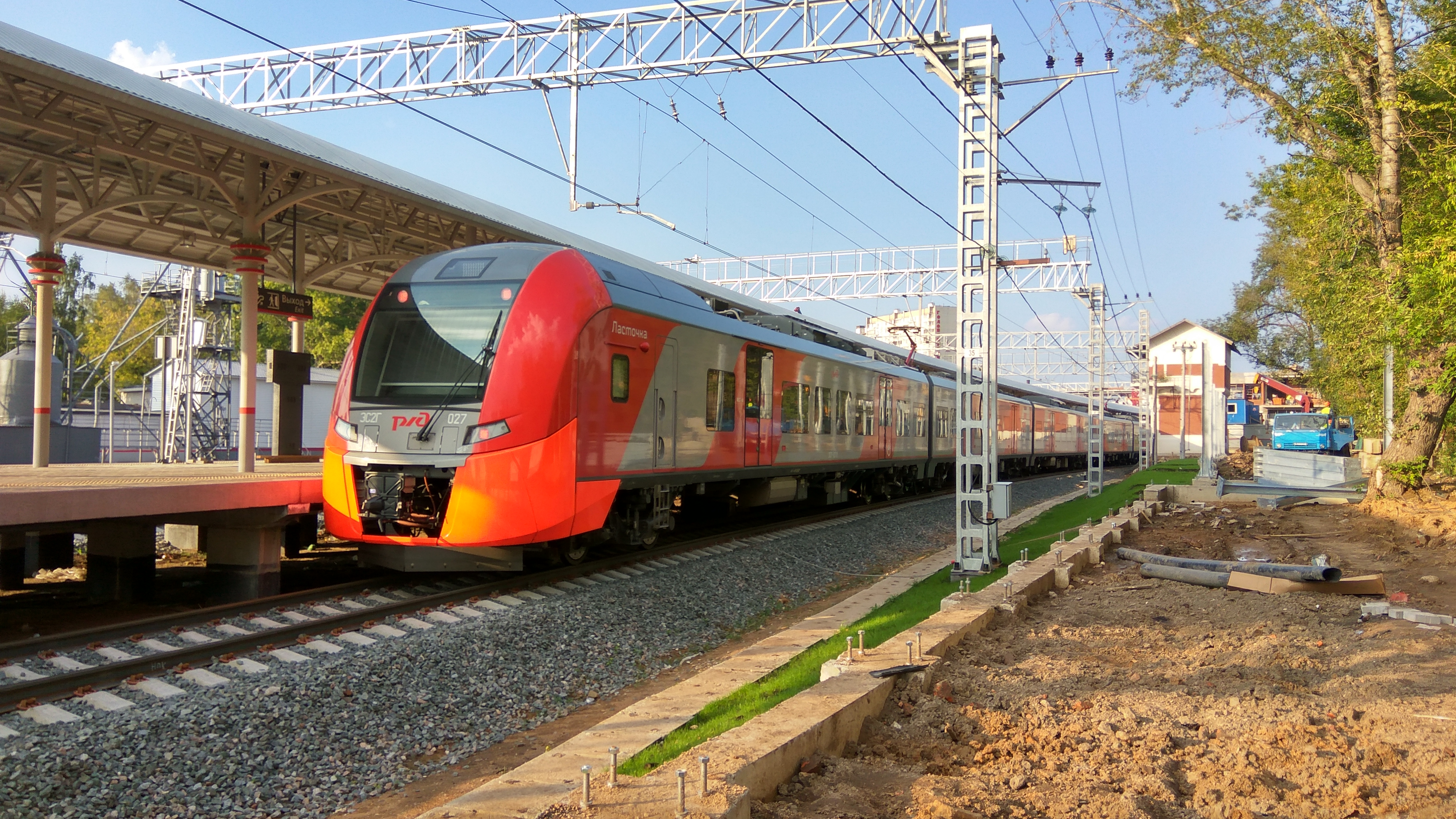

General information
- Coordinates: 55.8397°N 37.5203°E
- System: Moscow Metro
- Line: Moscow Central Circle
- Platforms: 1 island platform
- Tracks: 2

History
- Opened: 1 November 2016; 9 years ago

Services
Preceding station	Moscow Metro	Following station
Baltiyskaya anticlockwise / outer	Moscow Central Circle	Likhobory clockwise / inner
Route map
Location
- Location within Moscow Metro

Koptevo (Russian: Коптево) is a station on the Moscow Central Circle of the Moscow Metro that opened in November 2016 in Moscow, Russia.

The station is named for the Koptevo District of Moscow where it is situated.
