= Vladykino (rural locality) =

Vladykino (Russian: Владыкино) is the name of several rural localities in Russia:

- Vladykino, Moscow Oblast, a village under the administrative jurisdiction of the Town of Klin in Klinsky District of Moscow Oblast; 56°31′N 36°43′E
- Vladykino, Novgorod Oblast, a village in Opechenskoye Settlement of Borovichsky District in Novgorod Oblast
- Vladykino, Issinsky District, Penza Oblast, a selo in Znamensko-Pestrovsky Selsoviet of Issinsky District in Penza Oblast
- Vladykino, Kamensky District, Penza Oblast, a selo in Vladykinsky Selsoviet of Kamensky District in Penza Oblast
- Vladykino, Pushkinogorsky District, Pskov Oblast, a village in Pushkinogorsky District of Pskov Oblast
- Vladykino, Velikoluksky District, Pskov Oblast, a village in Velikoluksky District of Pskov Oblast
- Vladykino, Kalininsky District, Saratov Oblast, a selo in Kalininsky District of Saratov Oblast
- Vladykino, Rtishchevsky District, Saratov Oblast, a selo in Rtishchevsky District of Saratov Oblast
- Vladykino, Vologda Oblast, a village in Chushevitsky Selsoviet of Verkhovazhsky District in Vologda Oblast
