= Zorge (Moscow Central Circle) =

Station on the Moscow Central Circle

Zorge Зорге
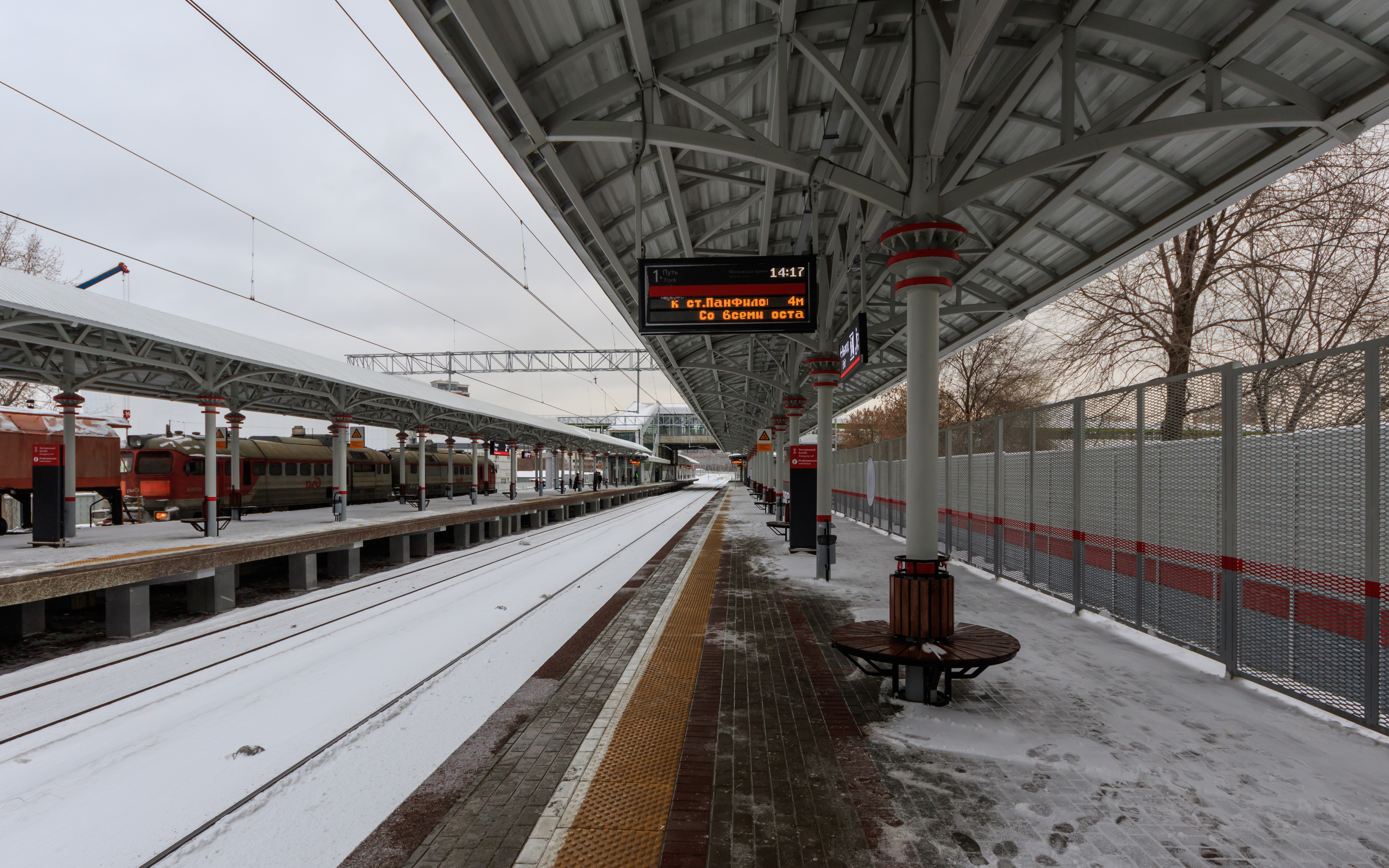

General information
- Location: Khoroshyovsky District, Northern Administrative Okrug
- Coordinates: 55.7878°N 37.5045°E
- System: Moscow Metro
- Line: Moscow Central Circle
- Platforms: 2 side platforms
- Tracks: 3

History
- Opened: 4 November 2016; 9 years ago

Services
Preceding station	Moscow Metro	Following station
Khoroshyovo anticlockwise / outer	Moscow Central Circle	Panfilovskaya clockwise / inner
Out-of-station interchange
Shchukinskaya towards Planernaya	Tagansko-Krasnopresnenskaya line transfer at Oktyabrskoye Pole	Polezhayevskaya towards Kotelniki
Route map
Location
- Location within Moscow Metro

Zorge (Russian: Зорге) is a station on the Moscow Central Circle of the Moscow Metro. It became the 30th station on the line when it opened in November 2016.

Zorge is near the Khodynskoye Pole area in northwestern Moscow. The station's name comes from the name of the street, Ulitsa Zorge, on which the station is situated. Ulitsa Zorge is named for Richard Sorge, a decorated Soviet intelligence officer who served in Nazi Germany and Japan.

Zorg, as well as Panfilovskaya station to the north, provides an out-of-station transfer to Oktyabrskoye Pole station of Moscow Metro's Line 7.
