= Shelepikha (Moscow Central Circle) =

Station on the Moscow Central Circle

Shelepikha Шелепиха
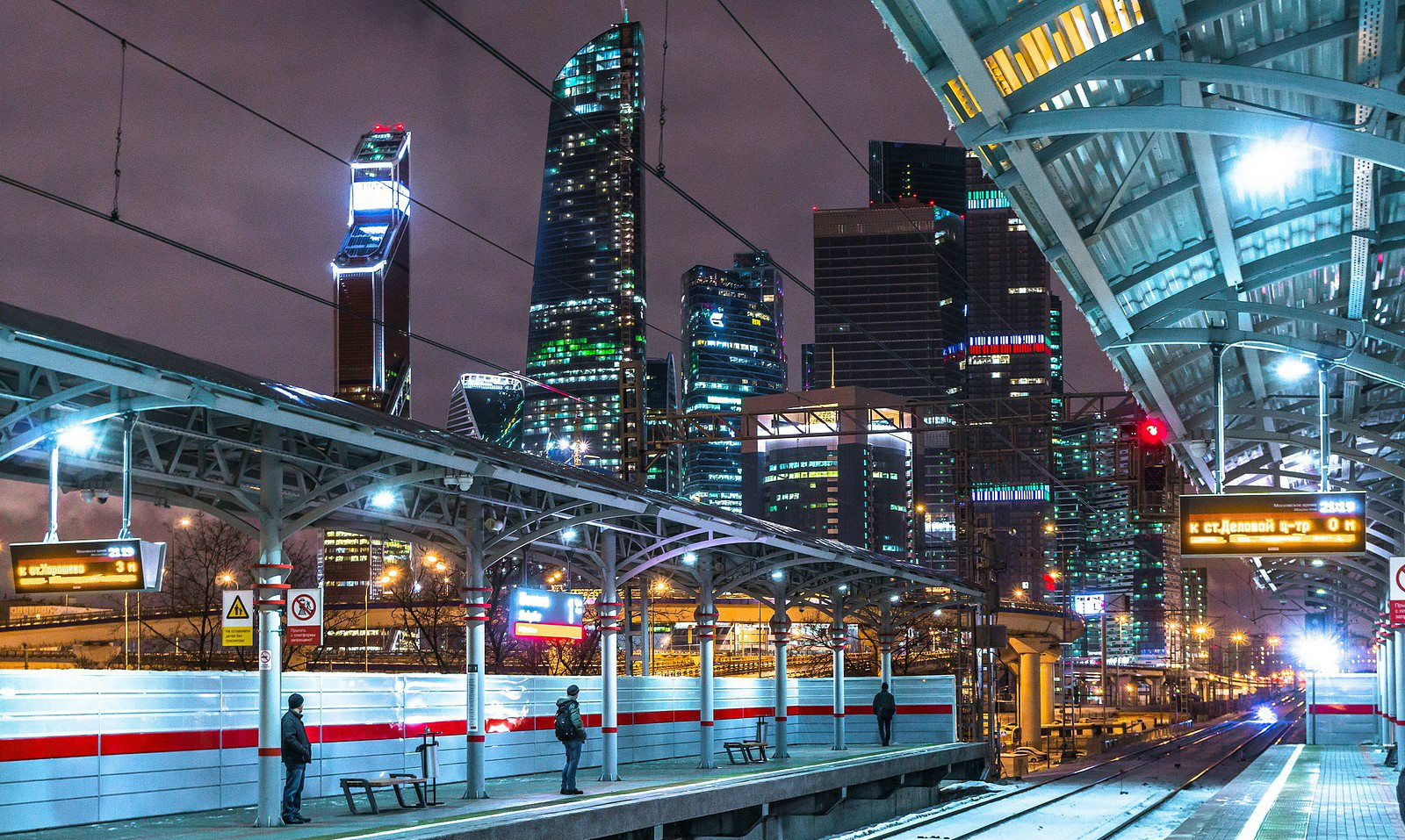

General information
- Coordinates: 55.7564°N 37.5263°E
- System: Moscow Metro
- Line: Moscow Central Circle
- Platforms: 2 side platforms
- Tracks: 2

History
- Opened: 10 September 2016; 9 years ago

Services
Preceding station	Moscow Metro	Following station
Delovoy Tsentr anticlockwise / outer	Moscow Central Circle	Khoroshyovo clockwise / inner
Out-of-station interchange
Zvenigorodskaya towards Ilyinskaya	Rublyovo-Arkhangelskaya line transfer at Shelepikha	Delovoy Tsentr Terminus
Route map
Location
- Location within Moscow Metro

Shelepikha (Russian: Шелепиха) is a station on the Moscow Central Circle of the Moscow Metro.
