= Prospekt Mira (Koltsevaya line) =

Moscow Metro station

Prospekt Mira Проспект Мира
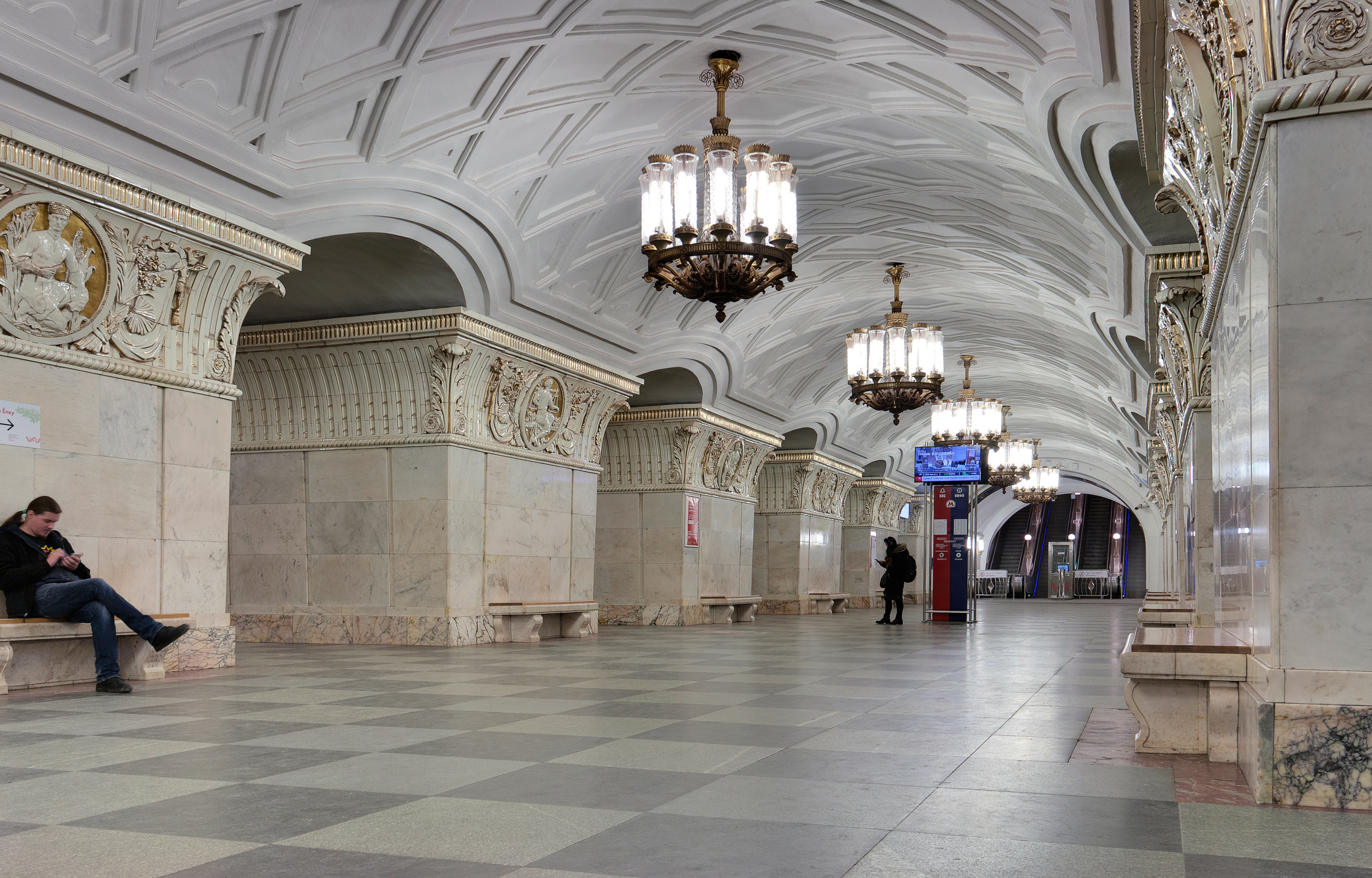

General information
- Location: Meshchansky District; Central Administrative Okrug; Moscow; Russia
- Coordinates: 55.7798°N 37.6318°E
- System: Moscow Metro station
- Owner: Moskovsky Metropoliten
- Line: Koltsevaya line
- Platforms: 1
- Tracks: 2

Construction
- Structure type: 1 island platform
- Depth: 40 metres (130 ft)
- Platform levels: 1
- Parking: No

Other information
- Station code: 069
- Fare zone: Partially Closed: May 2015-May 2016

History
- Opened: 30 January 1952; 74 years ago

Passengers
- 2002: 17,155,000

Services
Preceding station	Moscow Metro	Following station
Suvorovskaya anticlockwise / outer	Koltsevaya line	Komsomolskaya clockwise / inner
Sukharevskaya towards Novoyasenevskaya	Kaluzhsko-Rizhskaya line transfer at Prospekt Mira	Rizhskaya towards Medvedkovo
Route map
Location
- Location within Central Moscow

Prospekt Mira (Russian: Проспе́кт Ми́ра) (English: Peace Avenue) is a station of the Moscow Metro's Koltsevaya line. It is located between the stations Komsomolskaya and Novoslobodskaya stations. Opened on 30 January 1952 as part of the second stage of the line, it is a pylon design by architects Vladimir Gelfreykh and Mikhail Minkus.

Called initially Botanichesky Sad (Ботанический Сад) after the Botanical Garden of Moscow State University which are located nearby, the theme of this station develops the connotation of the name in the overall colour tone. The arches are faced with flared white marble and are topped with ceramic bas-relief frieze made of floral elements. In the centre are medallion bas-reliefs (work of G.Motovilov) featuring the different aspects in the development of agriculture in the Soviet Union. The station walls are laid with dark red Ural marble and chessboard floor pattern is made of grey and black granite. The ceiling vault is decorated with casts, and lighting comes from several cylindrical chandeliers.

The station's vestibule is built into the ground floor of a multi-story building on the corner of Mira Avenue and Protopopovsky lane. Designed by A.Arkin, its façade features sculptures and an original clock over the two archways. Inside, opposite the escalator hall is a large smalt artwork Mothers of the World by A.Kuznetsov.

In 1958, the wall at the end of the station was dismantled to make way for a transfer to the new station Botanichesky Sad on the Rizhskaya line. In 1966 both stations were renamed after to avoid confusion with the larger Moscow Botanical Garden of Academy of Sciences, which would eventually see the station Botanichesky Sad be named after that in 1978.

In May 2015, the vestibule of the station was closed for one year, due to major refurbishments works, reopened on 16 May 2016.

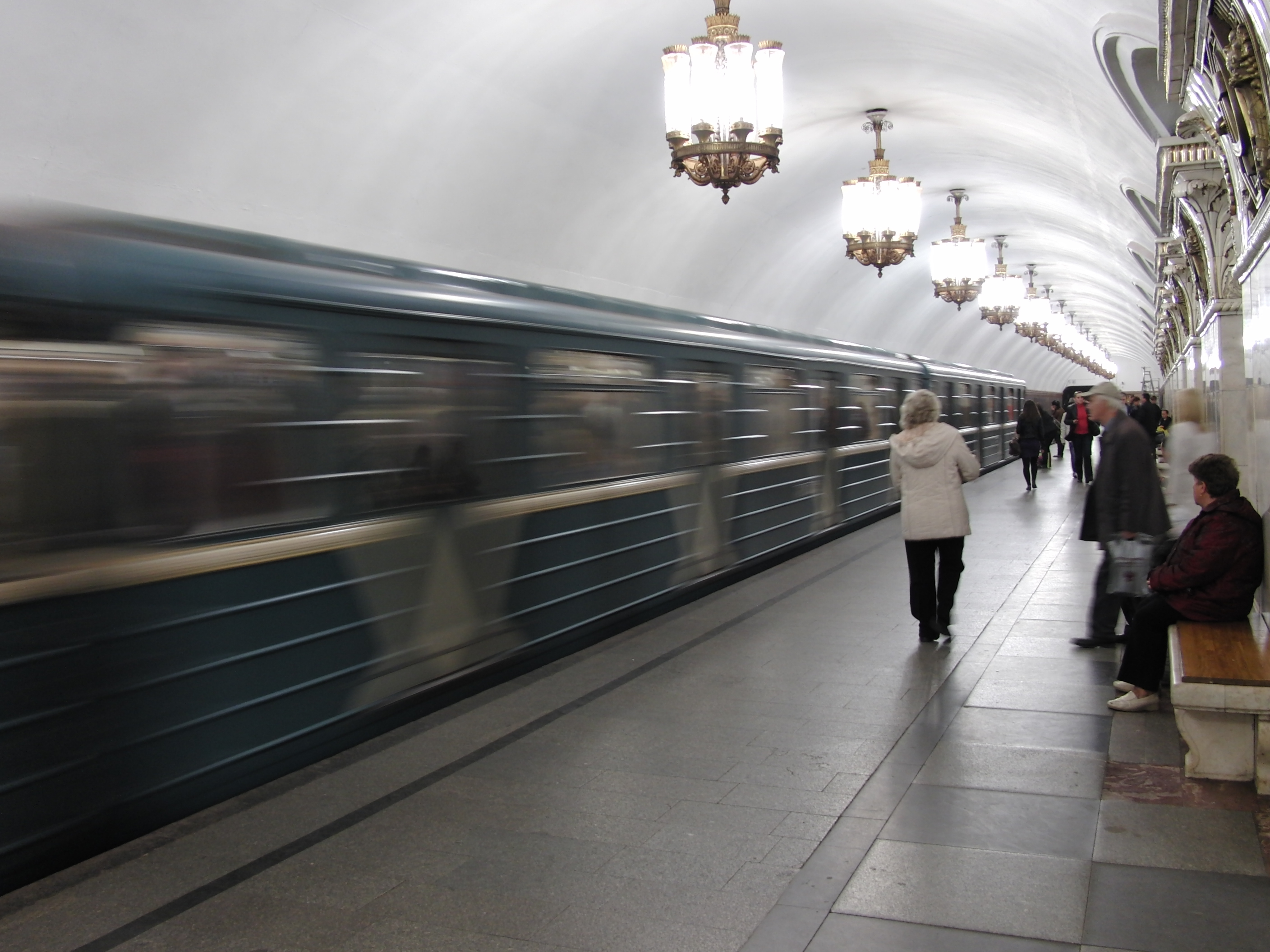
Station platform

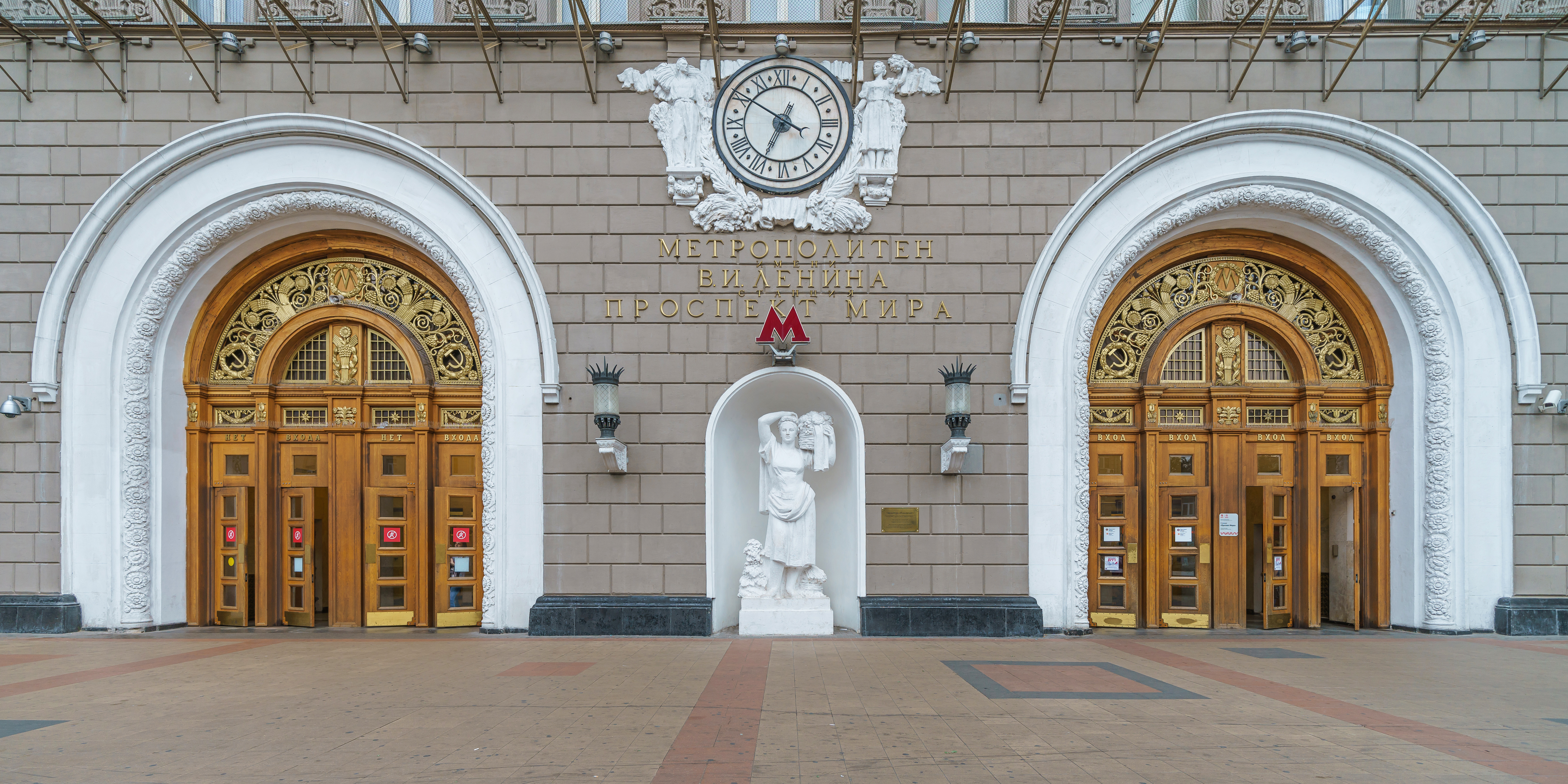
Entrance

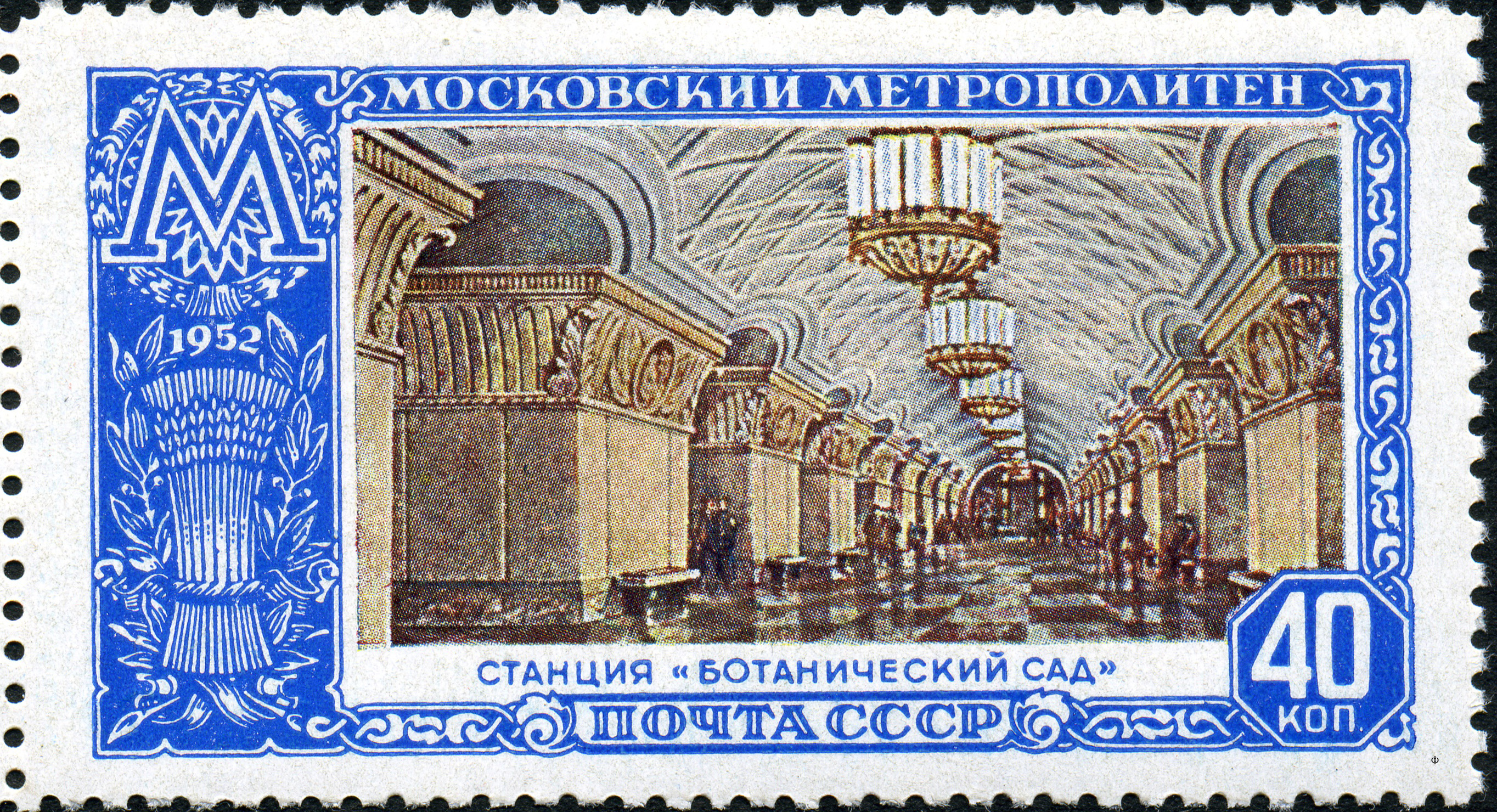
Image on 1952 stamp
