= Komsomolsky District, Russia =

Set of Russian districts

Location of the Chuvash Republic in Russia

Location of Ivanovo Oblast in Russia

Location of Khabarovsk Krai in Russia

Komsomolsky District is the name of several administrative and municipal districts in Russia. The districts are generally named for the Komsomol—the youth wing of the Communist Party of the Soviet Union.

== Districts of the federal subjects ==
- Komsomolsky District, Chuvash Republic, an administrative and municipal district of the Chuvash Republic
- Komsomolsky District, Ivanovo Oblast, an administrative and municipal district of Ivanovo Oblast
- Komsomolsky District, Khabarovsk Krai, an administrative and municipal district of Khabarovsk Krai

== City divisions ==
- Komsomolsky City District, a city district of Tolyatti, a city in Samara Oblast
Location of Tolyatti in Russia

== See also ==
- Komsomolsky (disambiguation)
- Komsomolsk (disambiguation)
- Komsomol (disambiguation)
