= Prospekt Mira (Kaluzhsko-Rizhskaya line) =

Moscow Metro station

Prospekt Mira Проспект Мира
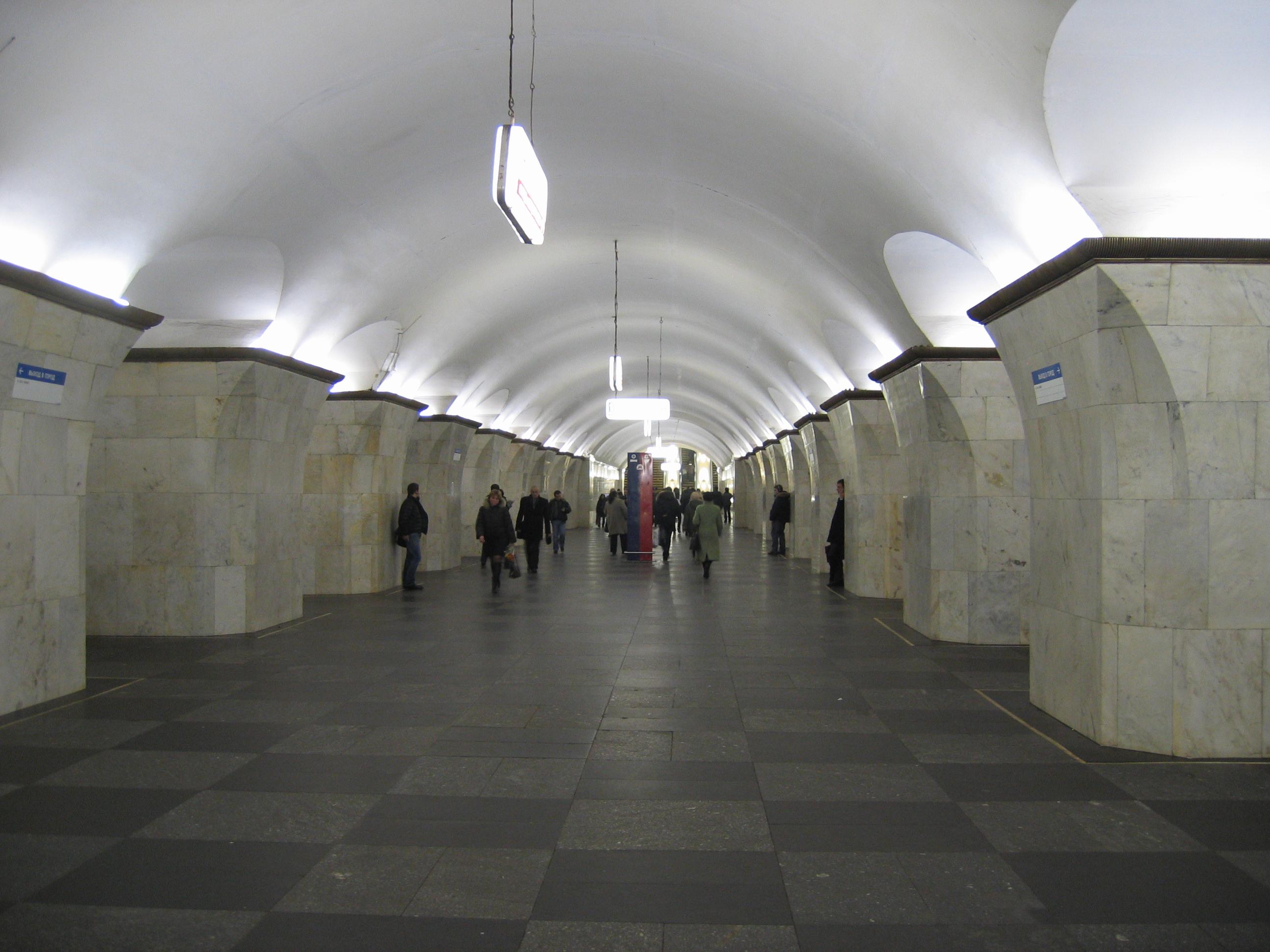

General information
- Location: Meshchansky District, Central Administrative Okrug; Moscow; Russia
- Coordinates: 55.7812°N 37.6318°E
- System: Moscow Metro station
- Owner: Moskovsky Metropoliten
- Line: Kaluzhsko-Rizhskaya line
- Platforms: 1 island platform
- Tracks: 2
- Connections: Trolleybus: 9, 48; Tram: 7

Construction
- Structure type: Pylon station
- Depth: 50 metres (160 ft)
- Platform levels: 1
- Parking: No

Other information
- Station code: 093

History
- Opened: 1 May 1958; 68 years ago
- Former names: Botanichesky Sad (1958-1966)

Services
Preceding station	Moscow Metro	Following station
Sukharevskaya towards Novoyasenevskaya	Kaluzhsko-Rizhskaya line	Rizhskaya towards Medvedkovo
Suvorovskaya anticlockwise / outer	Koltsevaya line transfer at Prospekt Mira	Komsomolskaya clockwise / inner
Route map
Location
- Location within Central Moscow

Prospekt Mira (Russian: Проспект Мира) is a station on the Kaluzhsko–Rizhskaya line of the Moscow Metro. It was designed by V. Lebedev and P. Shteller and opened on 1 May 1958. The station features flared pylons faced with white marble and trimmed with sharp-edged metal cornices. The walls are faced with off-white ceramic tile with horizontal black stripes.

From 1958 until 1971, the station was the southern terminus of the Rizhskaya line.

The entrance to the station is located on the west side of Prospekt Mira (north of Protopopovsky Pereulok) on the ground floor of the Metro's central control building.

== Transfers ==
From this station, it is possible to transfer to Prospekt Mira on the Koltsevaya line.

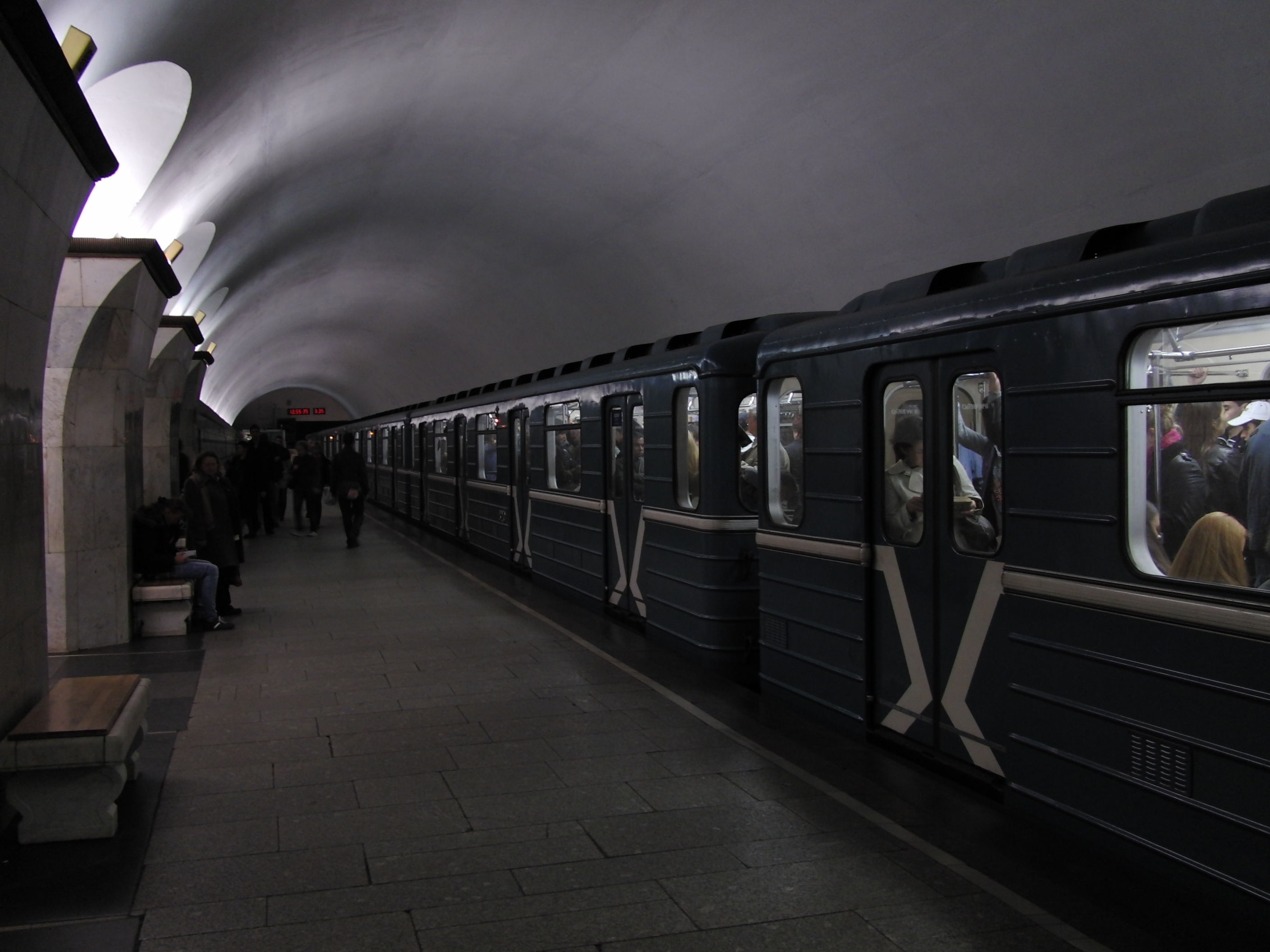
Platform of the station
