= Oktyabrskaya (Kaluzhsko-Rizhskaya line) =

Moscow Metro station

Oktyabrskaya Октябрьская
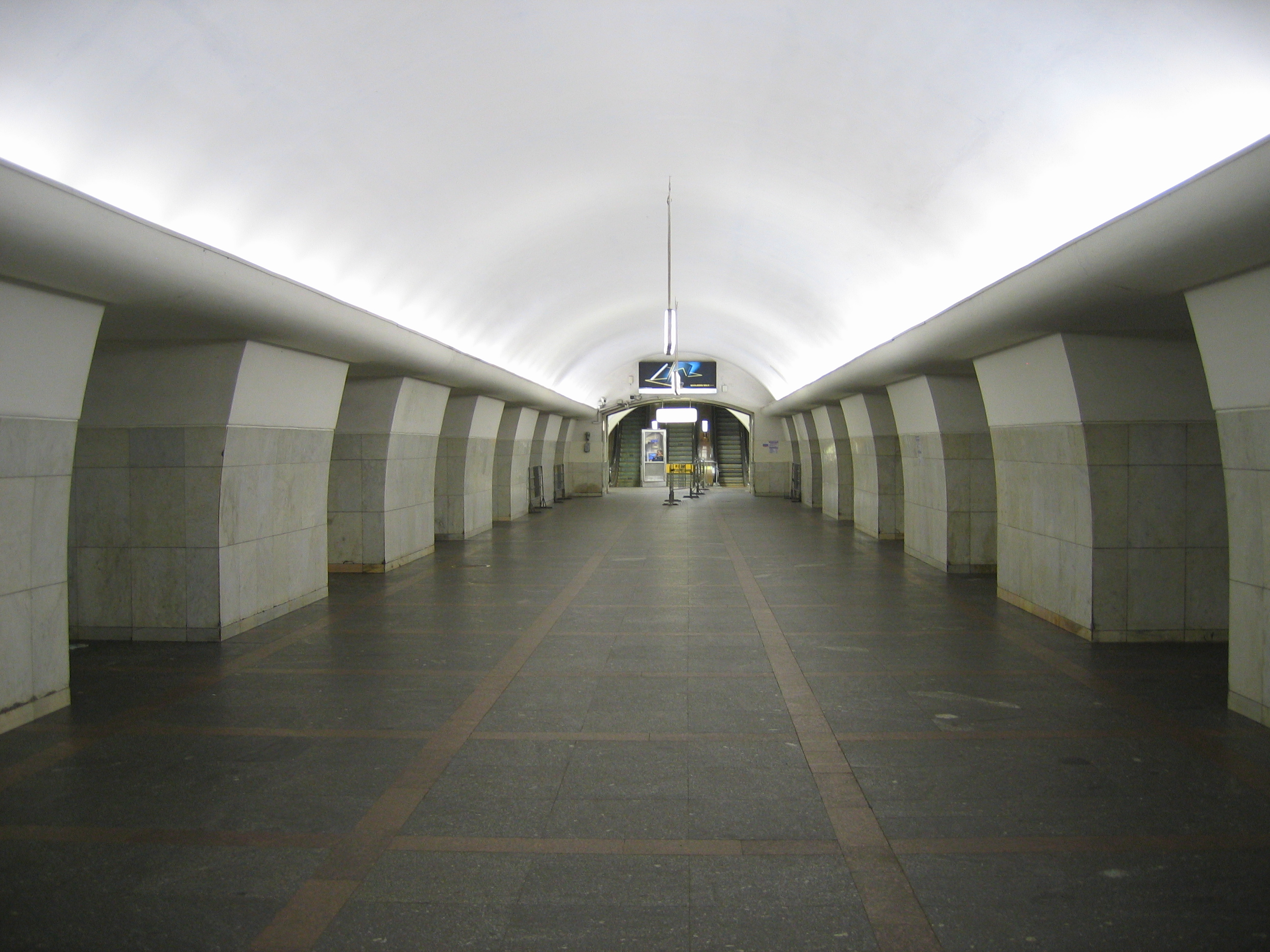

General information
- Location: Kaluzhskaya Square; Yakimanka District; Central Administrative Okrug
- Coordinates: 55.7306°N 37.6112°E
- System: Moscow Metro station
- Owner: Moskovsky Metropoliten
- Line: Kaluzhsko-Rizhskaya line
- Platforms: 1 island platform
- Tracks: 2
- Connections: Bus: м1, e10, 297, н11

Construction
- Structure type: Deep pylon tri-vault
- Depth: 50 metres (160 ft)
- Platform levels: 1
- Parking: No

Other information
- Station code: 098

History
- Opened: 13 October 1962; 63 years ago

Passengers
- 2002: 9,307,500

Services
Preceding station	Moscow Metro	Following station
Shabolovskaya towards Novoyasenevskaya	Kaluzhsko-Rizhskaya line	Tretyakovskaya towards Medvedkovo
Dobryninskaya anticlockwise / outer	Koltsevaya line transfer at Oktyabrskaya	Park Kultury clockwise / inner
Route map
Location
- Location within Central Moscow

Oktyabrskaya (Russian: Октя́брьская, lit. 'October') is a Moscow Metro station in the Yakimanka District, Central Administrative Okrug, Moscow. It is on the Kaluzhsko–Rizhskaya line, between Shabolovskaya and Tretyakovskaya stations. Oktyabrskaya opened on 13 October 1962 and was originally the northern terminus of the Kaluzhskaya line before the latter extended northwards in 1970.

== Design ==
The architects were A. Strelkov, Nina Aleshina, Yu. Vdovin. Oktyabrskaya has block white marble pylons and walls faced with white ceramic tile.

The station's freestanding entrance vestibule is located on Big Yakimanka street about half a block north of Kaluzhskaya Square (in 1962 - October square, hence the name), nearby the Garden ring.

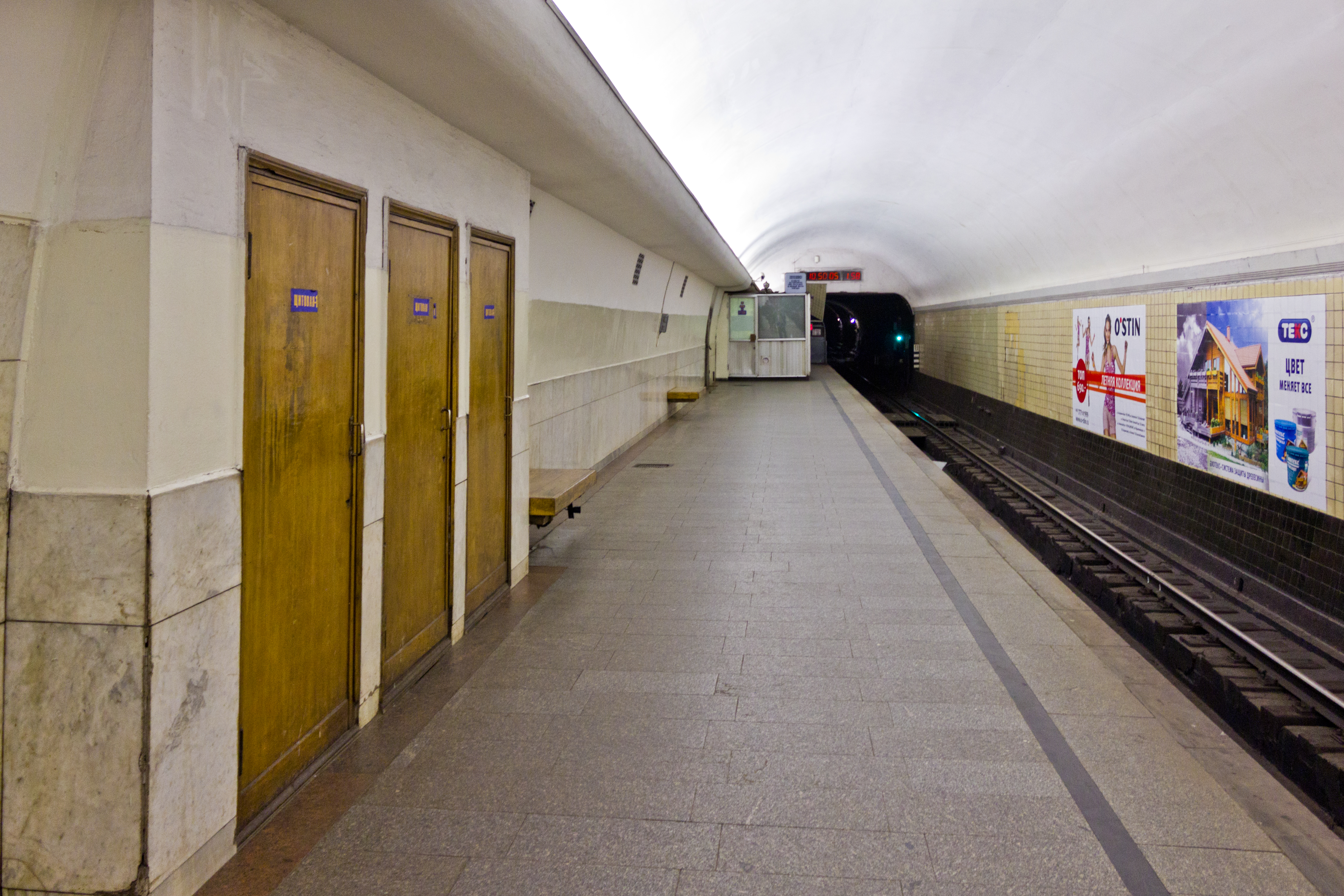
Platform of Oktyabrskaya

== Transfers ==
From this station it is possible to transfer to Oktyabrskaya on the Koltsevaya line.
