= Tretyakovsky =

Tretyakovsky (masculine), Tretyakovskaya (feminine), or Tretyakovskoye (neuter) may refer to:

- Tretyakovsky District, a district of Altai Krai, Russia
- Tretyakovsky (rural locality), a rural locality (a settlement) in Novosibirsk Oblast, Russia
- Tretyakovskaya (Moscow Metro), a station of the Moscow Metro, Moscow, Russia
- Tretyakov Gallery (Tretyakovskaya galereya), an art gallery in Moscow, Russia
