= Komsomol (disambiguation) =

Komsomol may refer to:

- Komsomol, the former Communist Union of Youth in the Soviet Union
- Leninist Komsomol of the Russian Federation, the current youth organization of the Communist Party of the Russian Federation.

Places

- Komsomol, Beylagan, a village in Azerbaijan
- Komsomol, Salyan, a village in Azerbaijan
- Komsomol, Kazakhstan, a village in Kazakhstan
- Komsomol, Kyrgyzstan, a village in Kyrgyzstan
- Komsomol, Russia, a selo in Sheinsky Rural Okrug of Suntarsky District of the Sakha Republic
- Komsomolobod, Farkhor District a Jamoat in Tajikistan

Other

- K-3 Leninsky Komsomol, the first nuclear submarine of the Soviet Union.

== See also ==
- Komsomolets (disambiguation)
- Komsomolsk (disambiguation)
- Komsomolsky (disambiguation)
