= Alekseyevskaya (Moscow Metro) =

Moscow Metro station

Alekseyevskaya Алексеевская
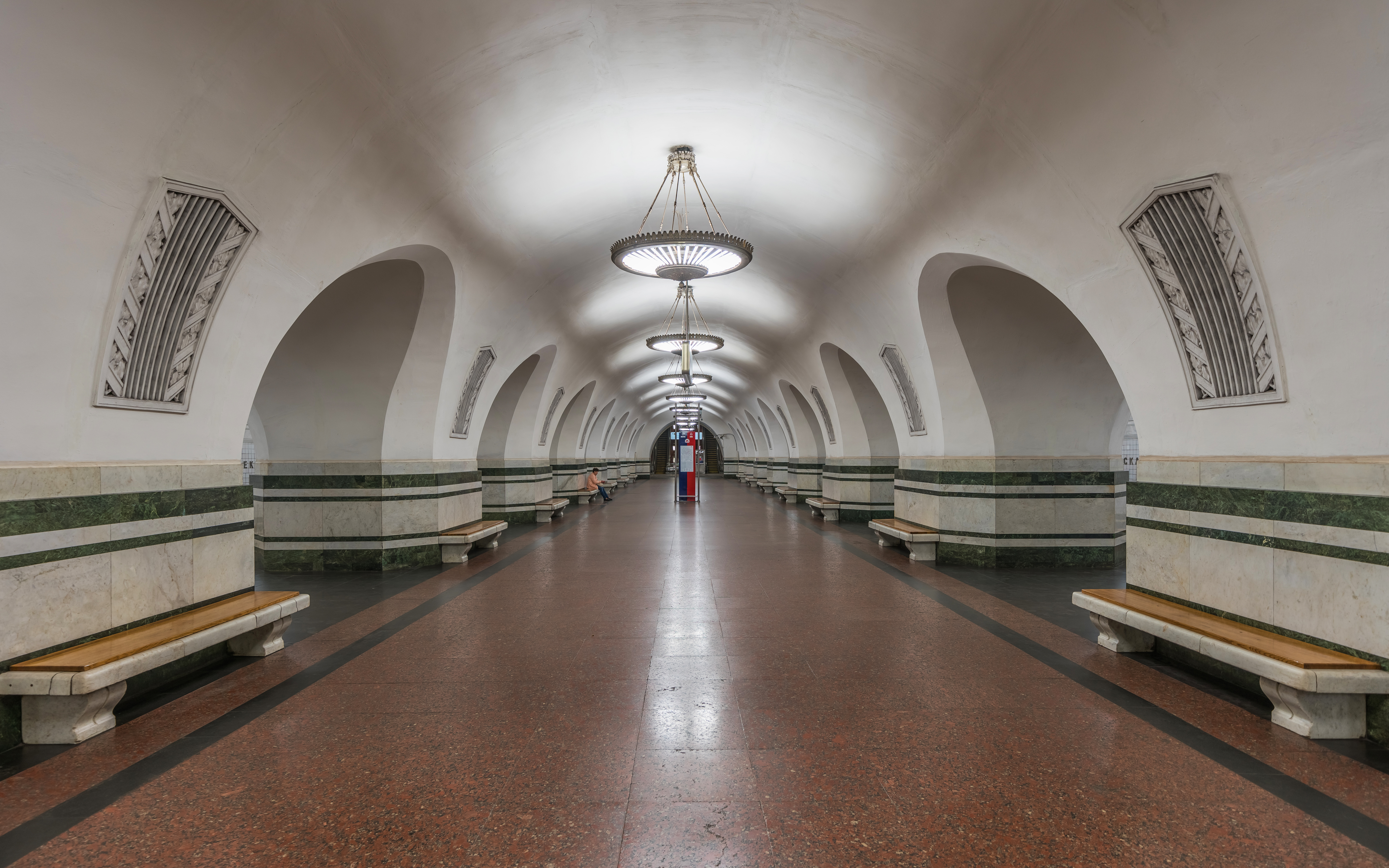

General information
- Location: Alekseyevsky District; North-Eastern Administrative Okrug; Moscow; Russia
- Coordinates: 55.8088°N 37.6390°E
- System: Moscow Metro station
- Owner: Moscow Metro
- Line: Kaluzhsko-Rizhskaya line
- Platforms: 1
- Tracks: 2
- Connections: Bus: 85, 714; Trolleybus: 9, 14, 37, 48

Construction
- Depth: 51 metres (167 ft)
- Platform levels: 1
- Parking: No

Other information
- Station code: 091

History
- Opened: 1 May 1958; 68 years ago
- Former names: Mir (1958–1966); Scherbakovskaya (1966–1990)

Passengers
- 2002: 19,783,000

Services
Preceding station	Moscow Metro	Following station
Rizhskaya towards Novoyasenevskaya	Kaluzhsko-Rizhskaya line	VDNKh towards Medvedkovo
Route map
Location
- Location within Moscow Metro

Alekseyevskaya (Russian: Алексе́евская, IPA: [ɐlʲɪkˈsʲeɪfskəjə]) is a station on the Moscow Metro's Kaluzhsko-Rizhskaya line. It serves Alexeyevsky District. The station's round entrance is located on the east side of Prospekt Mira between Staroalexeyevskaya and Novoalexeyevskaya streets. From its opening in 1958 to 1966 the station was known as "Mir" (Russian: Мир) and thus bore the shortest name in the history of the Moscow Metro.

== History ==
It was designed by S. Kravets, Yu. Kolesnikova, and G. Golubev and opened on 1 May 1958. The station was originally planned to be as heavily decorated as previous stations, but the design was modified due to Khrushchev's opposition to unnecessary decorative elements. As a result, Alexeyevskaya has surprisingly clean lines for a station built in the 1950s. Its octagonal pylons are white marble with green stripes, and the arches, ceiling, and ventilation grilles are painted white. Lighting comes from restrained yet elegant chandeliers.

The station was originally named Mir, but was changed to Scherbakovskaya in 1966 in honor of Aleksandr Shcherbakov, a founding member of the Union of Soviet Writers. In November 1990, the city renamed the station Alekseyevskaya for the historical settlement of Alekseyevskoye, which once belonged to Prince Dmitry Troubetskoy.

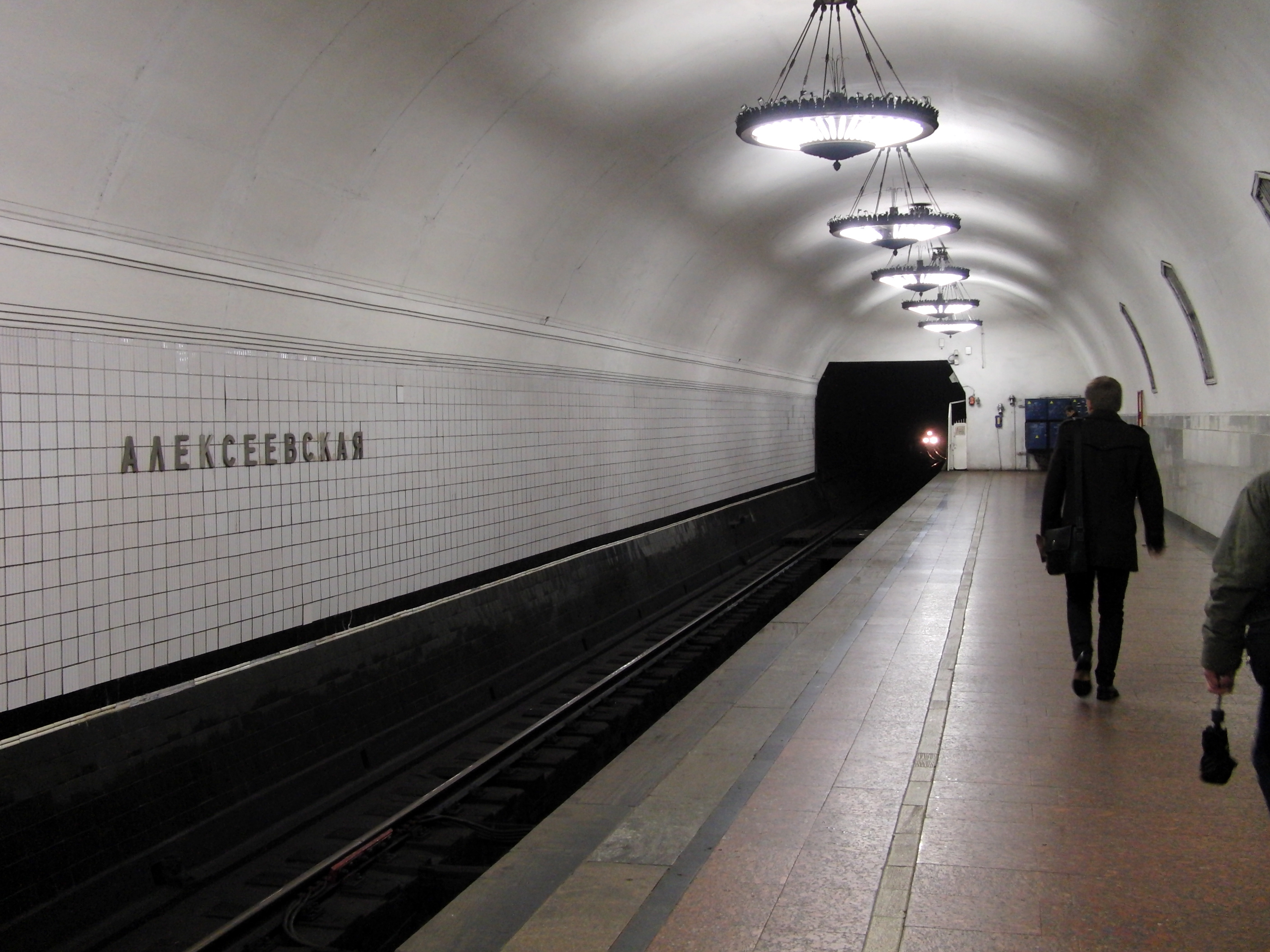
Alekseyevskaya platform
