= Kitay-gorod (Moscow Metro) =

Moscow Metro station

Kitay-gorod Китай-город
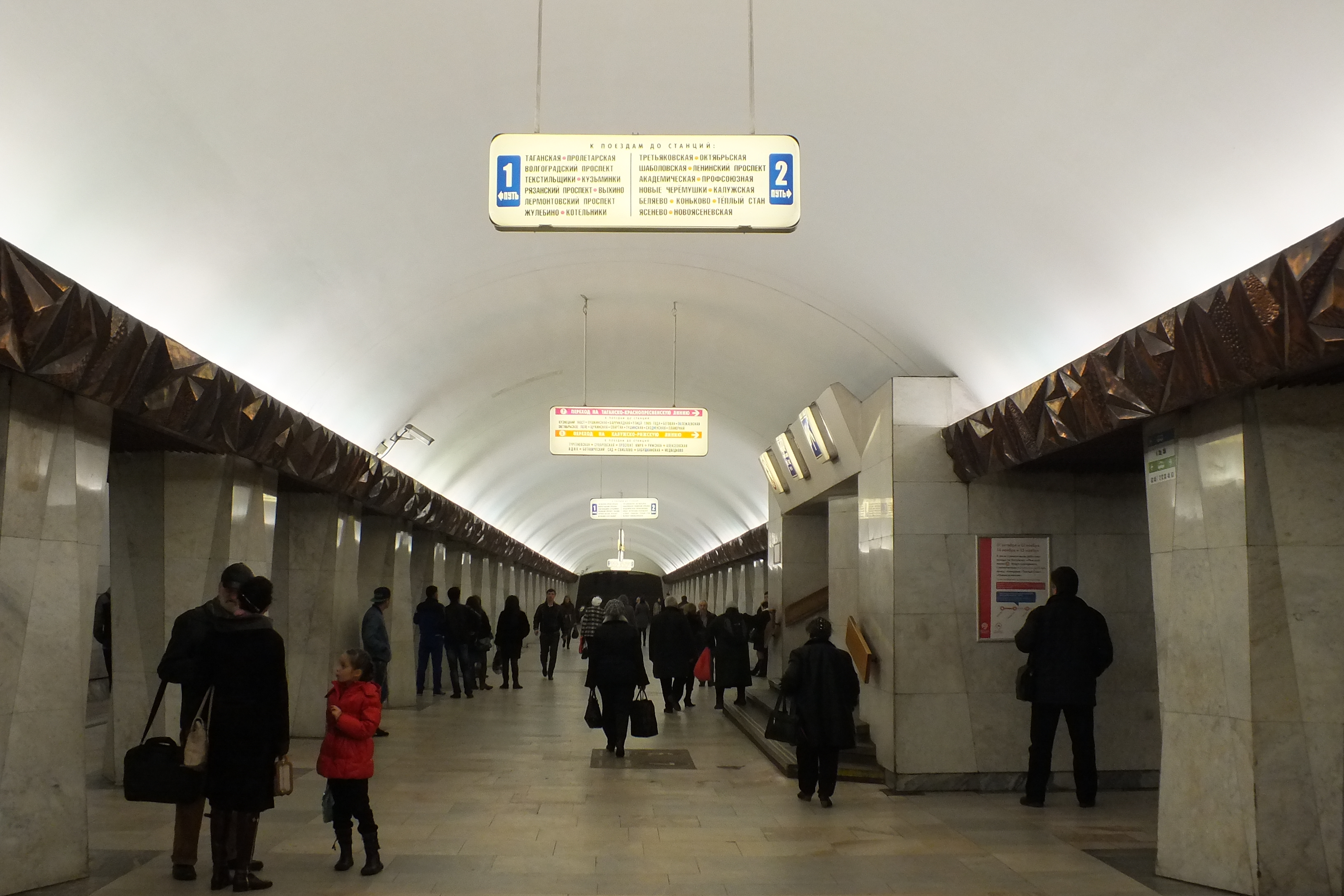

General information
- Location: Ilyinskiye Vorota Square; Tverskoy District; Central Administrative Okrug; Moscow; Russia
- Coordinates: 55.7553°N 37.6333°E
- System: Moscow Metro station
- Owner: Moskovsky Metropoliten
- Lines: Kaluzhsko-Rizhskaya line Tagansko-Krasnopresnenskaya line
- Platforms: 2
- Tracks: 4
- Connections: Bus: м3, м5, м7, м8, м9, м10, м27, К, 38, 101, 122, 144, 158, 904, т25, н1, н2, н3, н4, н5, н6, н7, н8, н9, н11, н12, н13

Construction
- Structure type: Deep column station, two halls
- Depth: 29 metres (95 ft)
- Platform levels: 2
- Parking: No

Other information
- Station code: 096

History
- Opened: 3 January 1971; 55 years ago
- Former names: Ploshchad Nogina

Services
Preceding station	Moscow Metro	Following station
Tretyakovskaya towards Novoyasenevskaya	Kaluzhsko-Rizhskaya line	Turgenevskaya towards Medvedkovo
Kuznetsky Most towards Planernaya	Tagansko-Krasnopresnenskaya line	Taganskaya towards Kotelniki
Route map
6 Kaluzhsko-Rizhskaya line
7 Tagansko-Krasnopresnenskaya line
Location
- Location within Central Moscow

Kitay-gorod (Russian: Кита́й-го́род) (English: Chinatown) is a Moscow Metro station complex in the Tverskoy District, Central Administrative Okrug, Moscow, Russia. It is on the Kaluzhsko-Rizhskaya and Tagansko-Krasnopresnenskaya lines. Kitay-gorod is one of the five stations within the Moscow Metro network providing a cross-platform interchange (besides Kuntsevskaya, Tretyakovskaya, Park Pobedy and Kashirskaya).

Until November 1990, the station was called Ploshchad Nogina (Russian: Площадь Ногина) (Nogin Square), for the square that was named in honour of Viktor Nogin, the prominent Bolshevik. After the city restored the historic name of Ploshchad Varvarskiye Vorota (Varvara Gate Square) to the southern part of Ploshchad Nogina, the station was renamed for the historic Kitay-gorod area, which was almost entirely destroyed by the Soviet regime in the 1930s.

== History ==
Originally the station was to open along the intersection of the two lines when their connecting points in the centre would link the Zhdanovskiy and Krasnopresnenskiy radii and the Kaluzhskiy and Rizhskiy radii in mid-1970s. However the overcrowding of the ring line due to passengers travelling between the two lines it was decided to accelerate works on this transfer point prematurely.

The first trains arrived from both Kaluzhskaya and Zhdanovskaya lines on 30 December 1970. Because Ploshad Nogina was a terminus for both lines, trains would terminate at the eastern hall and then go off into the tunnels, where piston junctions were installed for both lines, and then come back on the western hall. For the transfer purposes, it was possible for passengers not to depart the trains when they crossed the platform on the eastern hall.

On 31 December 1971, the Kaluzhskaya line linked up with the Rizhskaya to form the Kaluzhsko-Rizhskaya line. Trains from that line began operating in normal thoroughfare, though it was still possible to go on the Zdanovskaya line by boarding on the eastern platform. The transfer point entered its full operational regime only in late 1975 when on the 17 December, Zdanovskaya and Krasnopresnenskaya lines connected to form the Zhdanovsko-Krasnopresnenskaya Line.

== Design ==
Consisting of two separate, parallel station halls united via a transfer corridor and two combined vestibules, the station was built in an era when decorative architecture once again began to emerge and the combined effort of the architects Strelkov and Moloshenok as well as decorative authors Rusin, Lapina and Bodniek, whose efforts, amongst other places, are seen on the metallic artworks on the walls of both halls.

The western hall, nicknamed Kristall (Crystal) is decorated with two rows of angular pylons faced with light gray marble. Large metal cornicles running along the base of the ceiling hide the illumination lamps. The walls are faced with bright marble and the floor with gray granite. The eastern hall is nicknamed Garmoshka (Garmon), because of its pylons (faced with yellowish marble) which look like a stretched accordion parallel to the length of the hall. The walls are faced with a greyish marble and the floor with bright granite. Heritage of the station's original name, Ploshchad Nogina, can still be found midway in the transfer passage, where a bust of Viktor Nogin (sculptor Shlykov) still stands.

== Transfers ==
The station serves northbound trains heading towards Medvedkovo and Planernaya come via the eastern platform and southbound trains heading towards Novoyasenevskaya and Kotelniki coming via the western one. For passengers wishing to travel in the opposite direction, it is required to use a transfer corridor linking the two platforms.

== Exits ==
Two underground vestibules allow transfer to the surface. The southern vestibule is located under Slavyanskaya Square and is interlinked with multiple subways. Both escalator tunnels follow directly to the vestibule. The northern one is located under the Staraya Square with subway linkages to the Maroseika street along with others. The passengers must first travel up a flight of stairs from the two halls before turning left and travelling for a while and then go up on a combined escalator. This arrangement was purpose-built for a transfer to the future Maroseika station of the Arbatsko-Pokrovskaya Line, whose tunnels pass north of the Kitay-gorod station.

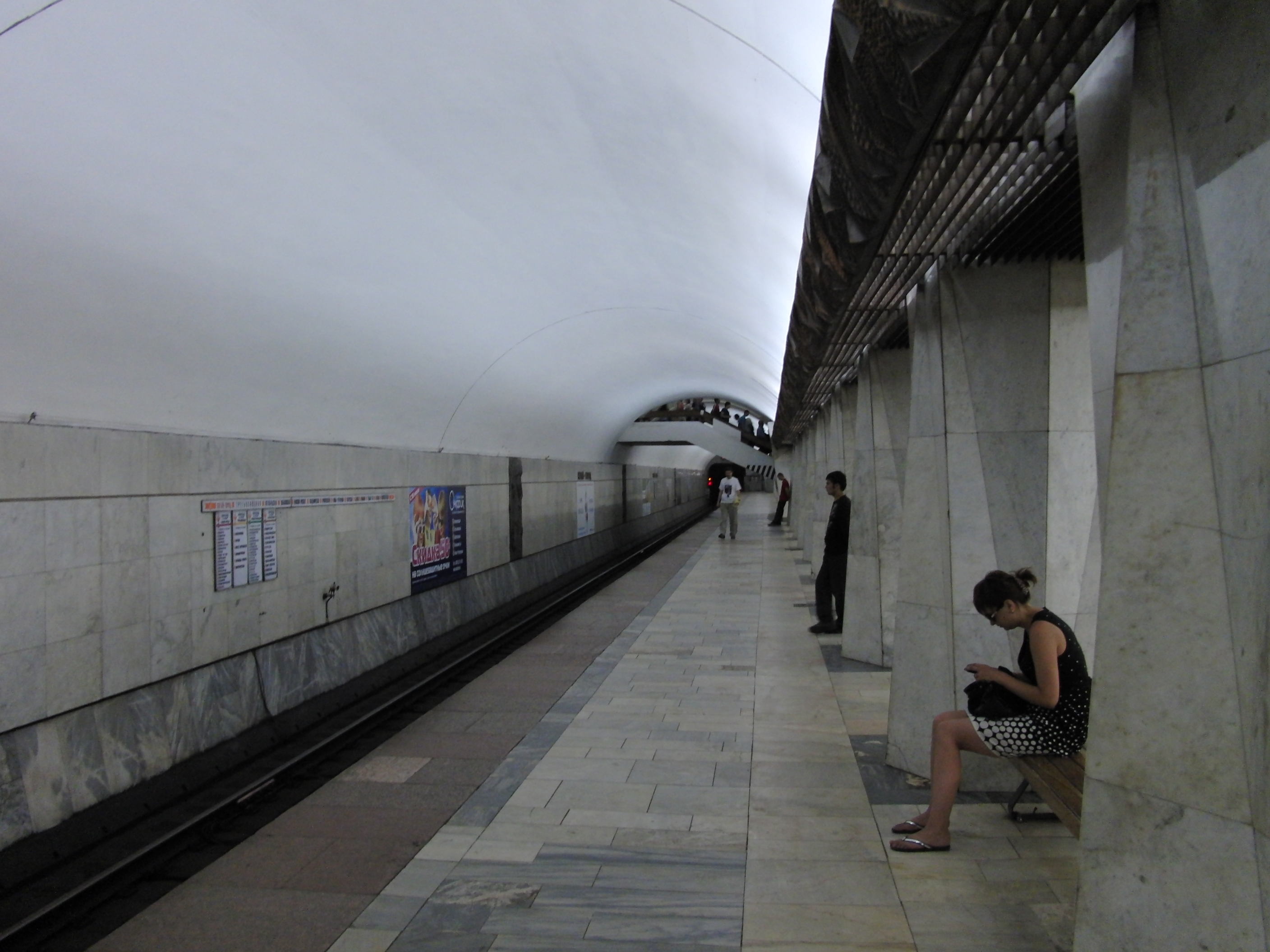
Station platform
