= Komsomolsky District =

Komsomolsky District may refer to:

- Komsomolsky District, Russia, name of several districts in Russia
- Komsomolskyi Raion, a city district of Kherson, Ukraine

== See also ==
- Komsomolsky (disambiguation)
