= Sukharevskaya (Moscow Metro) =

Moscow Metro station

Sukharevskaya Сухаревская
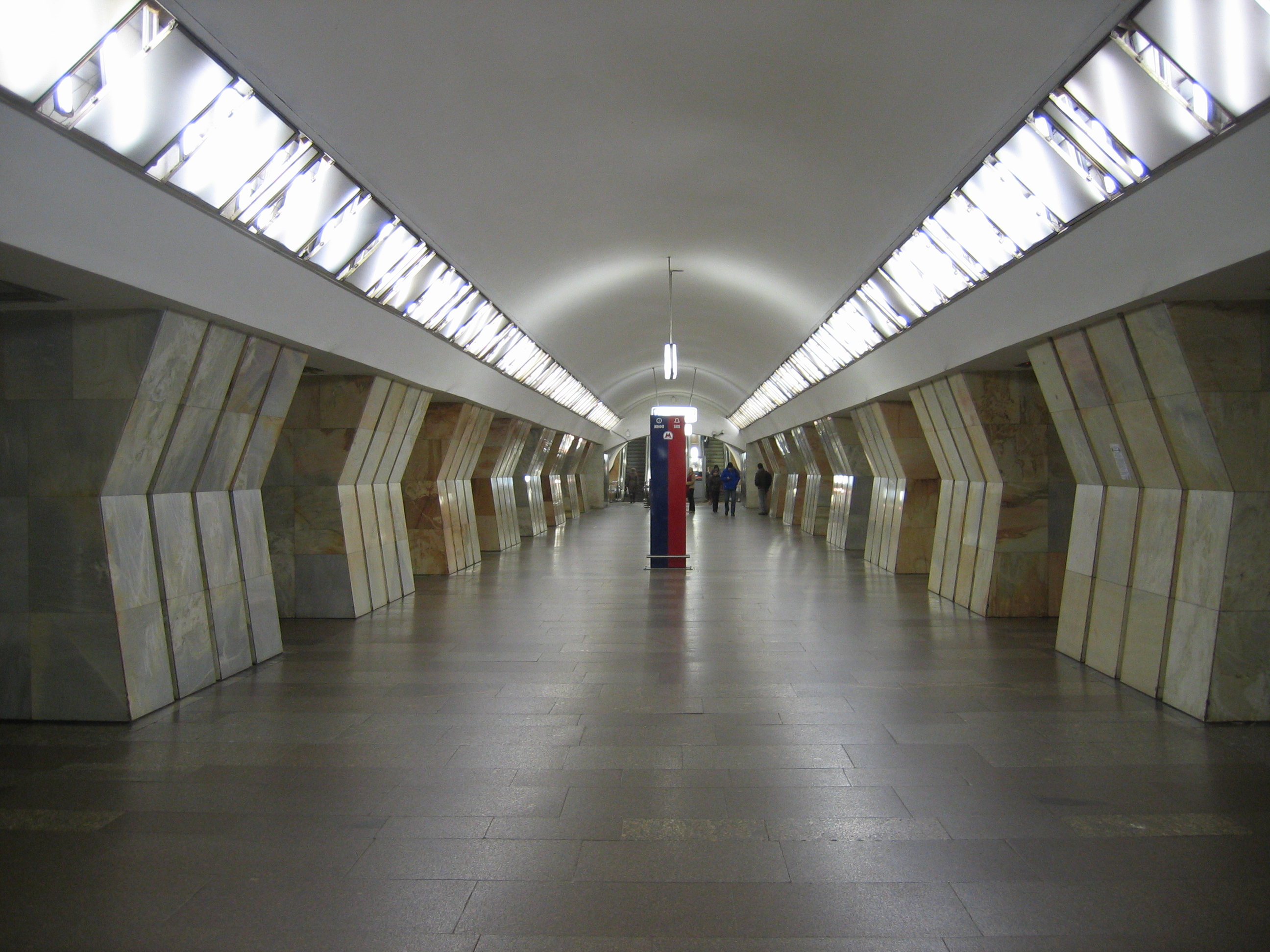

General information
- Location: Meshchansky District; Krasnoselsky District; Central Administrative Okrug; Moscow; Russia
- Coordinates: 55.7733°N 37.6319°E
- System: Moscow Metro station
- Owner: Moskovsky Metropoliten
- Line: Kaluzhsko-Rizhskaya line
- Platforms: 1
- Tracks: 2
- Connections: Trolleybus: B, 9, 10, 48

Construction
- Depth: 43 metres (141 ft)
- Platform levels: 1
- Parking: No

Other information
- Station code: 094

History
- Opened: 5 January 1972; 54 years ago
- Former names: Kolkhoznaya (1972–1990)

Passengers
- 2002: 15,293,500

Services
Preceding station	Moscow Metro	Following station
Turgenevskaya towards Novoyasenevskaya	Kaluzhsko-Rizhskaya line	Prospekt Mira towards Medvedkovo
Route map
Location
- Location within Central Moscow

Sukharevskaya (Russian: Сухаревская) is a station on the Kaluzhsko-Rizhskaya line of the Moscow Metro. It opened on 5 January 1972. The station's underground vestibule is located under Sretenka Street just south of the Garden Ring. From its opening until November 1990, the station was called Kolkhoznaya, as a nod to the collective farming of the Soviet Union and the similarly named square. As Soviet names lost favor, the square was renamed into the Large and Small Sukharev Squares, both of which are named for the Sukharev Tower, which stood nearby until 1934. The station was renamed Sukharevskaya, accordingly.

== Design ==
The yellowish marble pylons resemble stylized sheaves of wheat in keeping with the station's original name, Kolkhoznaya or "Collective Farm." The walls are faced with white marble and decorated with plaques by R. Pogrebnoy (who was also the architect), Ye. Kolyupanova, and S. Kolyupanov. Lighting comes from rows of inset lamps running along the base of the ceiling.

== Gallery ==
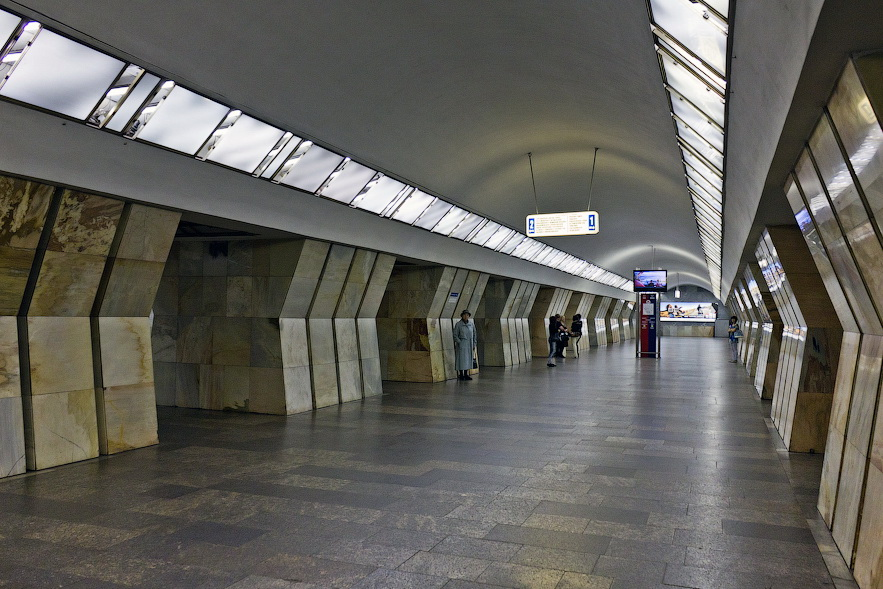
Central hall

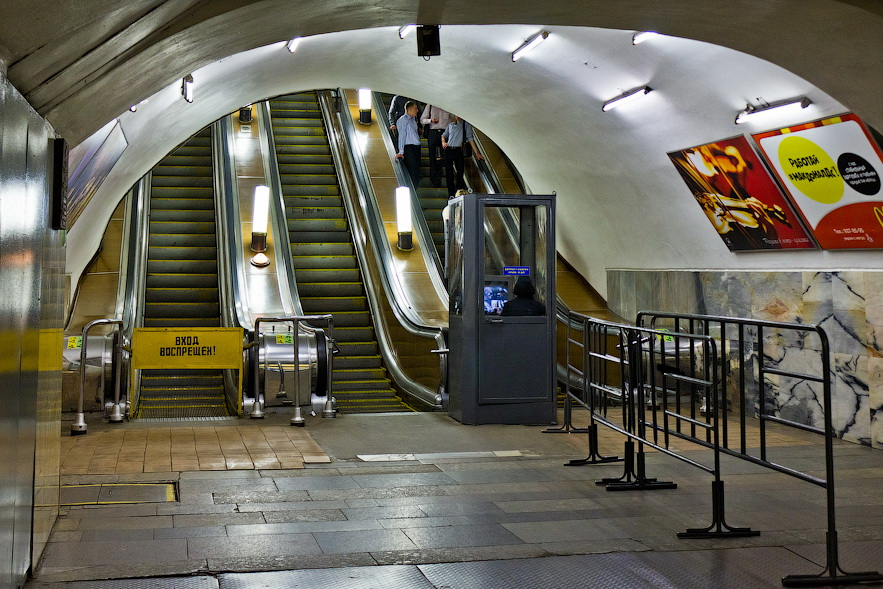
Exit to the city

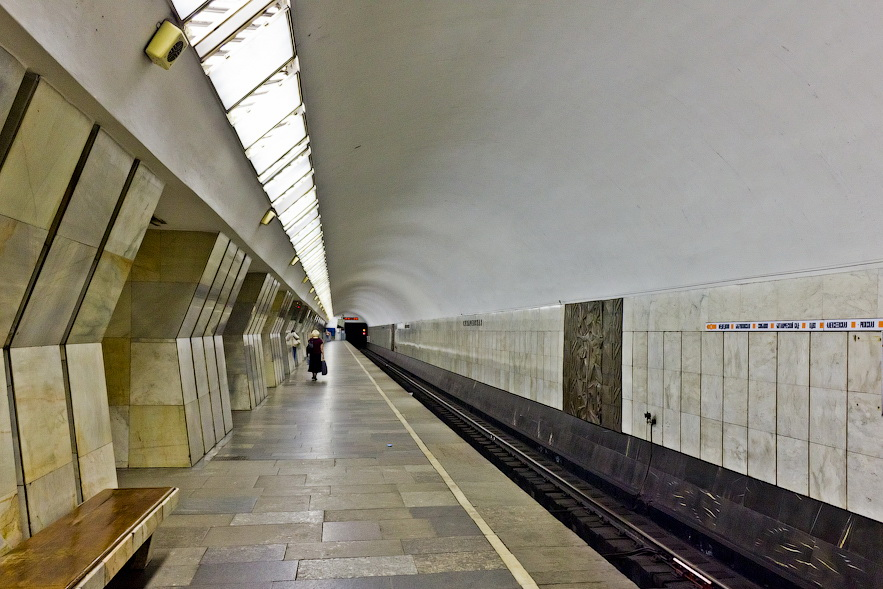
Platform
