= Tretyakovskaya (Moscow Metro) =

Moscow Metro station

Tretyakovskaya Третьяковская
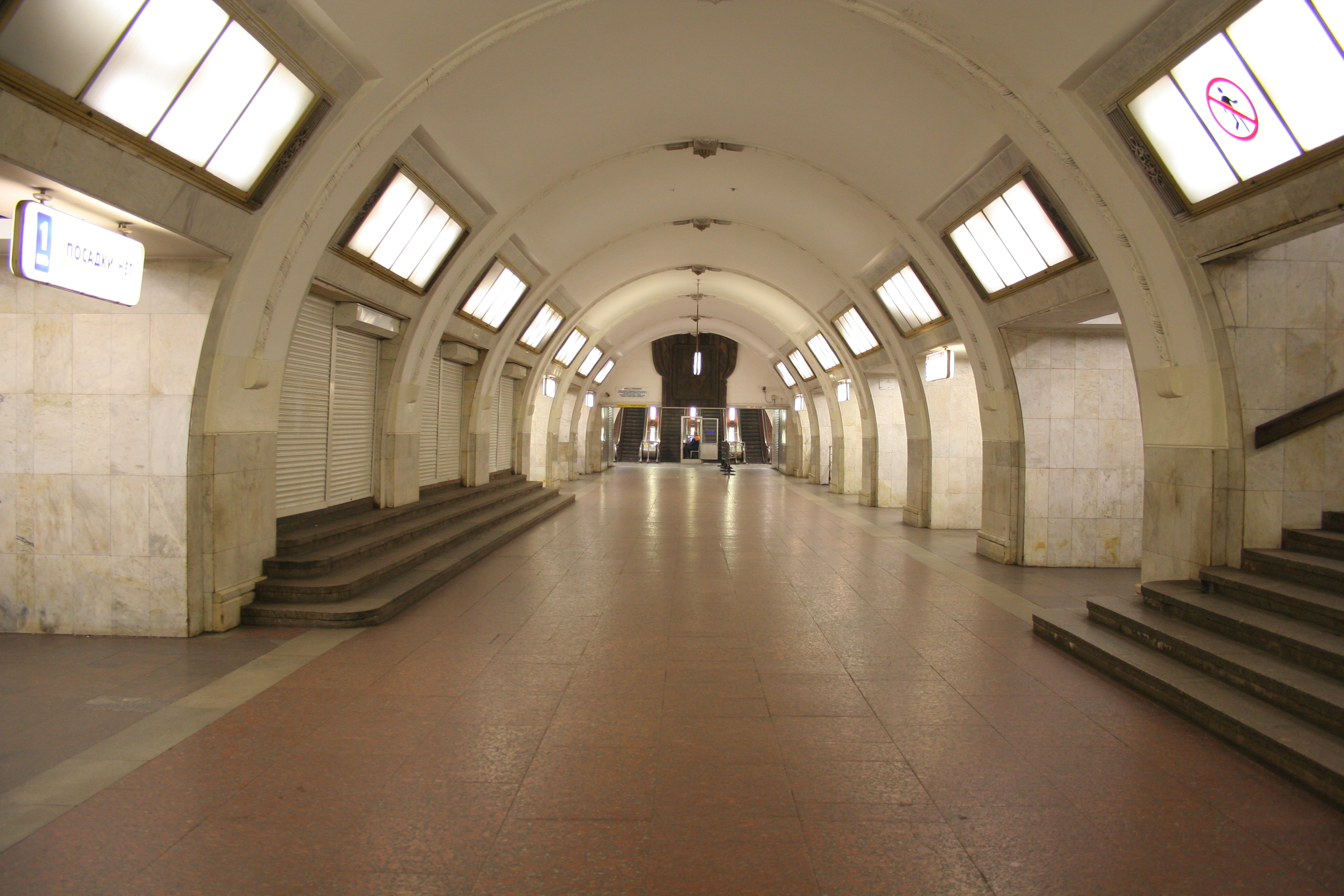
- Northern hall

General information
- Location: Zamoskvorechye District, Central Administrative Okrug
- Coordinates: 55.7412°N 37.6274°E
- System: Moscow Metro station
- Owner: Moskovsky Metropoliten
- Lines: Kaluzhsko-Rizhskaya line Kalininskaya line
- Platforms: 2
- Tracks: 4
- Connections: Tram: A, 3, 39, Bus: м5, н8

Construction
- Structure type: Deep pylon station, triple-vault
- Depth: 46 metres (151 ft)
- Platform levels: 1
- Parking: No

Other information
- Station code: 097 (Kaluzhsko-Rizhskaya Line); 085 (Kalininsko-Solntsevskaya Line)

History
- Opened: 3 January 1971; 55 years ago (southern hall); 25 January 1986; 40 years ago (northern hall)
- Former names: Novokuznetskaya (1971—1983)

Services
Preceding station	Moscow Metro	Following station
Oktyabrskaya towards Novoyasenevskaya	Kaluzhsko-Rizhskaya line	Kitay-gorod towards Medvedkovo
Terminus	Kalininsko-Solntsevskaya line (Kalininsky radius)	Marksistskaya towards Novokosino
Teatralnaya towards Khovrino	Zamoskvoretskaya line transfer at Novokuznetskaya	Paveletskaya towards Alma-Atinskaya
Route map
Kaluzhsko-Rizhskaya line
Kalininskaya line
Location
- Location within Central Moscow

Tretyakovskaya (Russian: Третьяко́вская. English: Tretyakov's) is a station complex of Moscow Metro located in the Zamoskvorechye District, Central Administrative Okrug. It offers a cross-platform interchange between Kaluzhsko-Rizhskaya and Kalininsko-Solntsevskaya lines. It is named after the nearby Tretyakov Gallery.

Unlike Kitay-gorod which was purpose-built as a cross-platform interchange station, Tretyakovskaya operated as a normal station before the connection with Kalininskaya Line in 1986. At that time a second hall was opened forming a cross-platform interchange. The two halls are joined by a passage located midway along their length and also by the shared vestibule, which opens onto Klimentovsky Lane.

The southern hall of Tretyakovskaya opened on 3 January 1971. Designed by V. Polikarpova and A. Marova, it has block pylons faced with white Koyelga marble and joined by a continuous marble cornice. Kaluzhsko-Rizhskaya Line trains stopped at both platforms of this hall until 1986, when the new northern hall opened. Currently the southern hall is served by northbound trains of both lines, terminating at Medvedkovo and Novokosino.

The northern hall, served by southbound trains terminating at Tretyakovskaya and Novoyasenevskaya, was designed by R. Pogrebnoy and V. Filippov. It features curved white marble separated by translucent panels which conceal fluorescent light fixtures. The walls are faced with red marble and decorated with a series of plaques by Alexander Bourganov depicting 16 great Russian painters, whose works the Tretyakov Gallery contains.

== Cross-platform design ==
Each hall serves one of two routes of both line 6 and line 8, allowing quicker interchanging.

== Transfers ==
The station is connected to Novokuznetskaya by a subway.

== List of the painters, whose portraits decorate the station ==
1. Andrey Rublyov 2. Dionisius 3. Alexey Venetcianov 4. Vasily Tropinin 5. Alexander Ivanov 6. Karl Brullov 7. Ilya Repin 8. Vasily Surikov 9. Vasily Vereshchagin 10. Viktor Vasnetcov 11. Ivan Shishkin 12. Isaak Levitan 13. Mikhail Vrubel 14. Valentin Serov 15. Ivan Martos 16. Sergey Konenkov

== Gallery ==
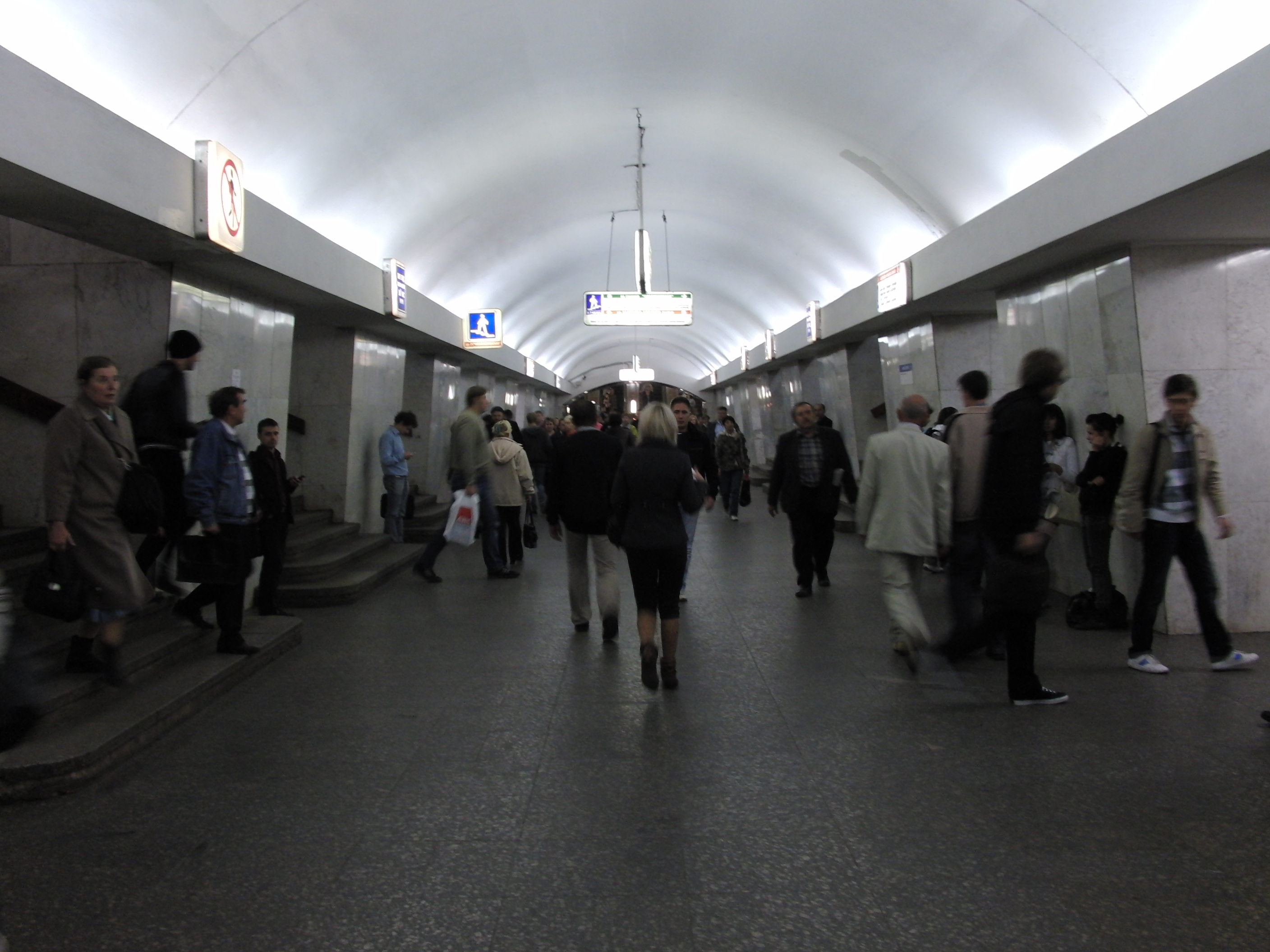
Southern hall

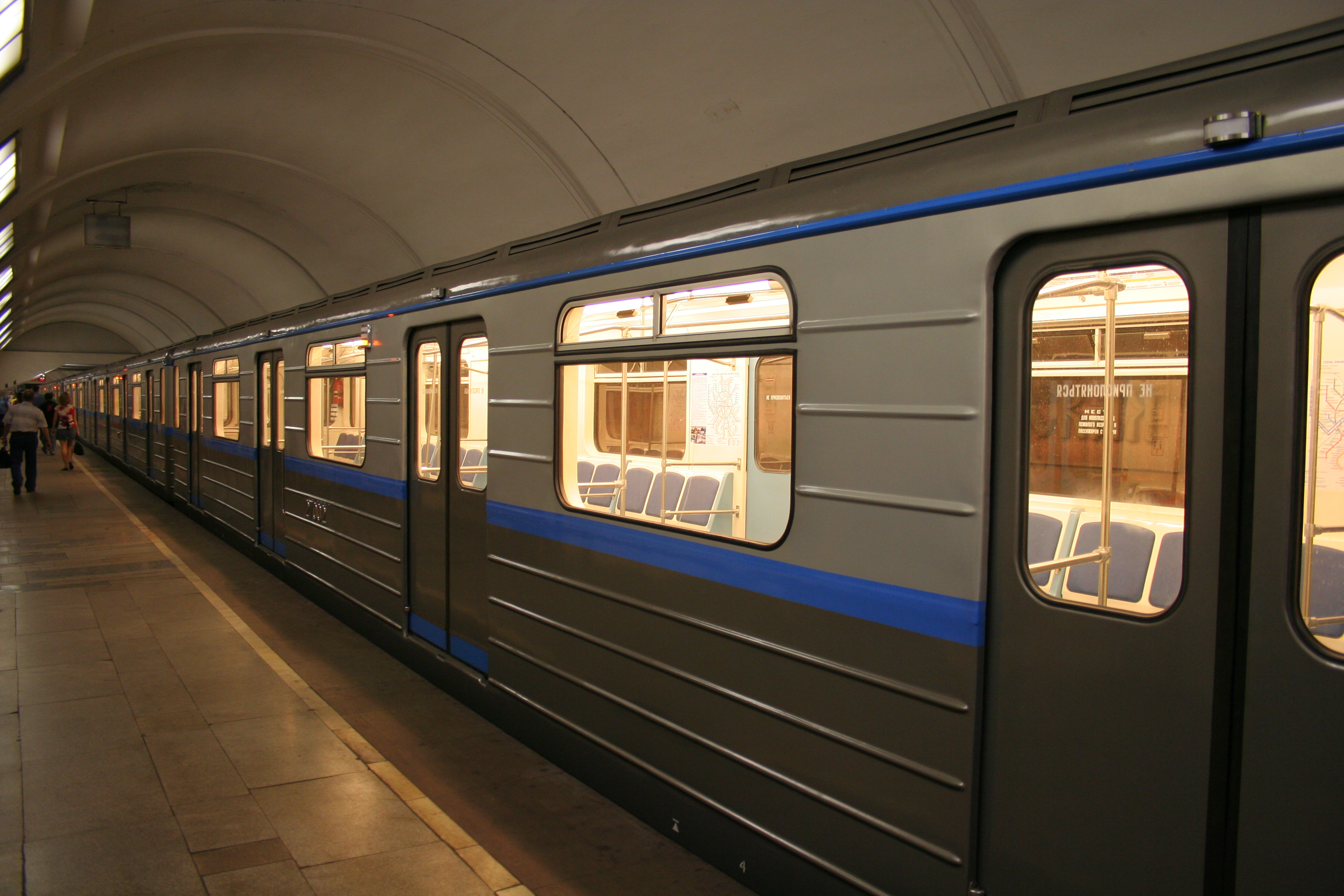
Northern hall, platform of the Kaluzhsko-Rizhskaya Line

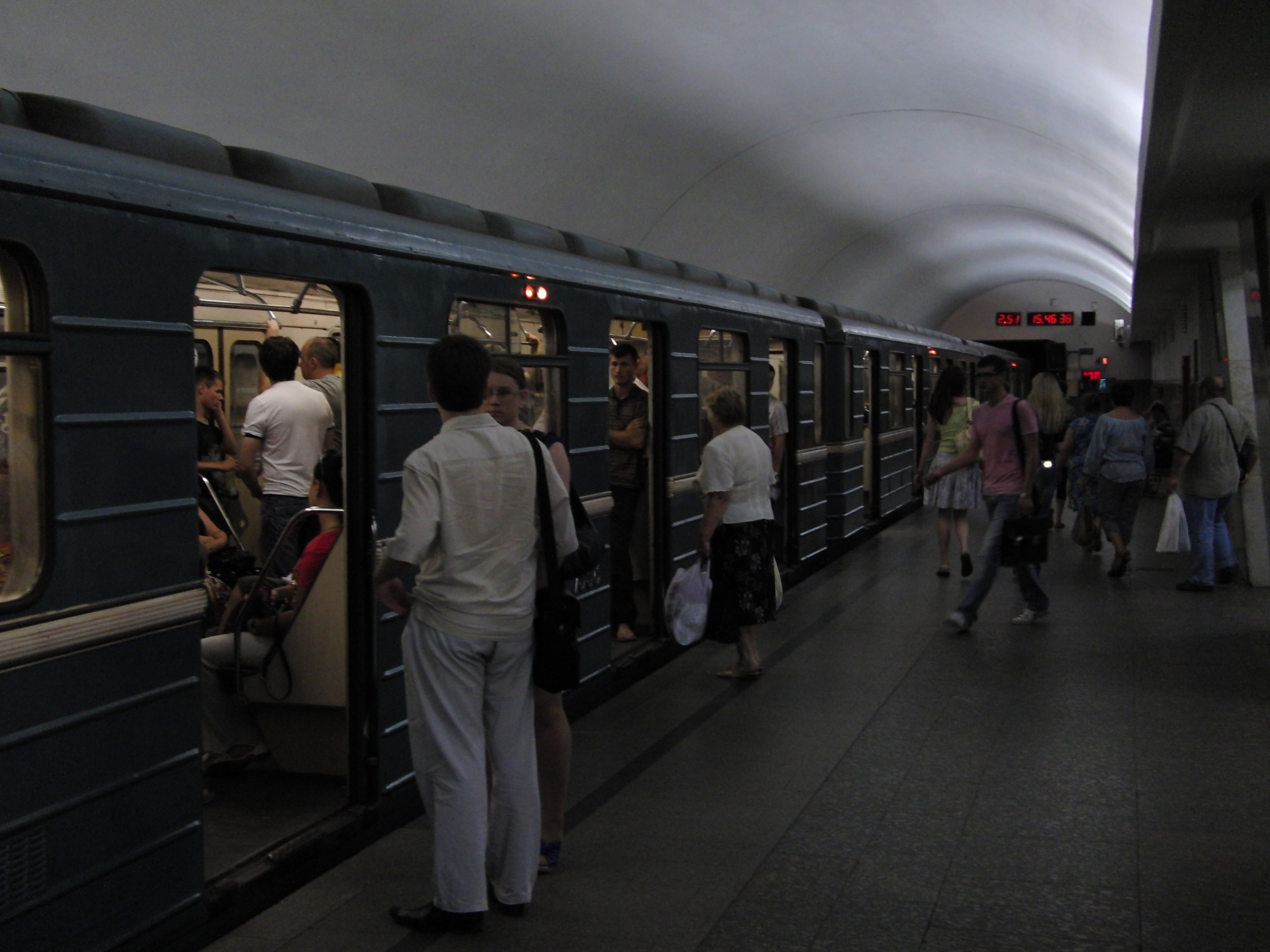
Southern hall, platform of the Kalininsko-Solntsevskaya Line
