= Rizhskaya (Kaluzhsko-Rizhskaya line) =

Moscow Metro station

Rizhskaya Рижская
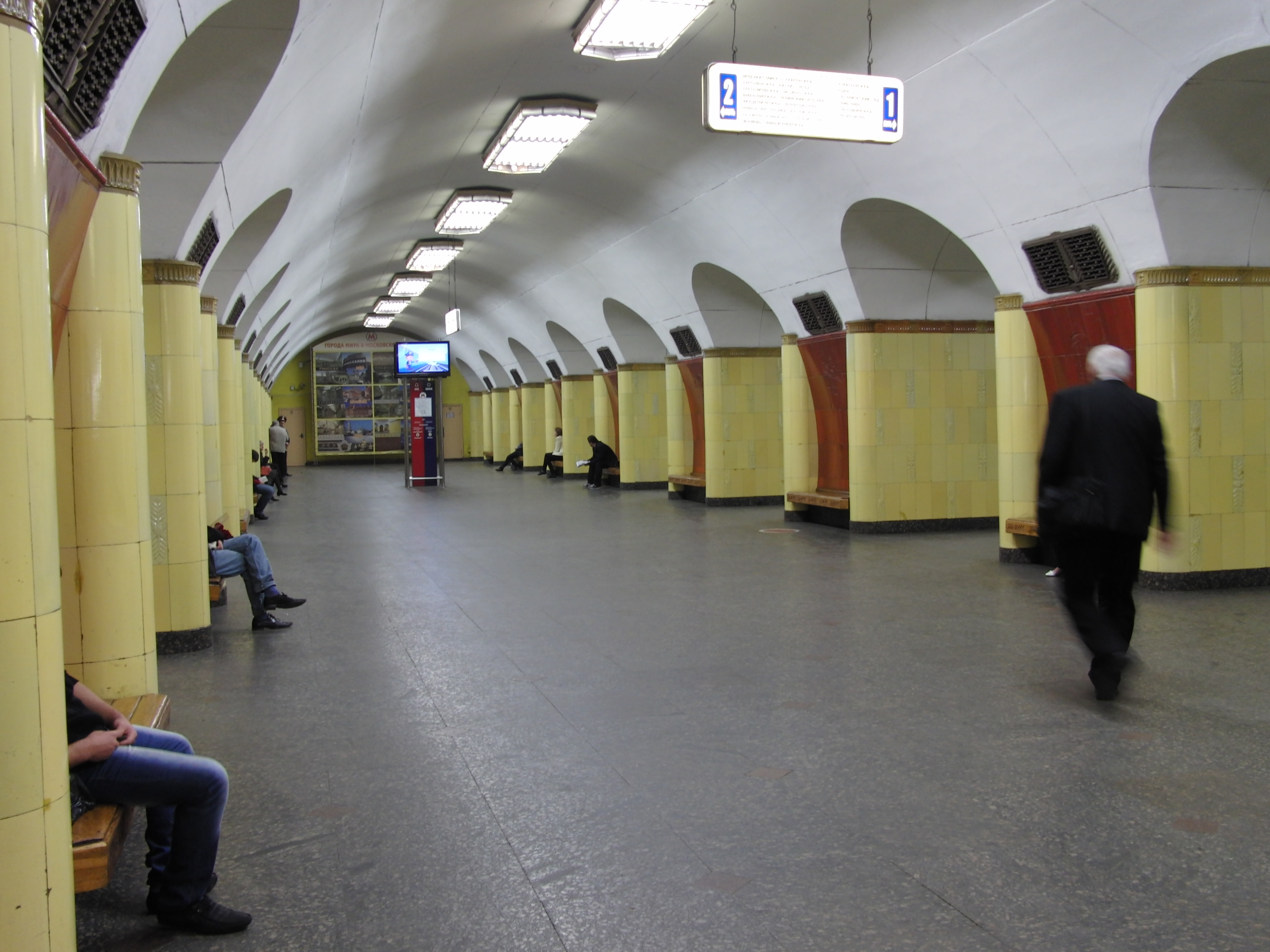

General information
- Location: Rizhskaya Square; Meshchansky District; North-Eastern Administrative Okrug
- Coordinates: 55.7936°N 37.6362°E
- System: Moscow Metro station
- Owner: Moskovsky Metropoliten
- Line: Kaluzhsko-Rizhskaya line
- Platforms: 1 island platform
- Tracks: 2
- Connections: Rizhskaya; Rizhskaya; Bus: 0, 19, 84, 85, 265, 714, 778; Trolleybus: 9, 14, 18, 37, 42, 48

Construction
- Depth: 46 metres (151 ft)
- Platform levels: 1
- Parking: No

Other information
- Station code: 092

History
- Opened: 1 May 1958; 68 years ago
- Closed: 22 August 2020; 6 years ago
- Rebuilt: 7 May 2022; 4 years ago

Passengers
- 2009: 15 304 450

Services
Preceding station	Moscow Metro	Following station
Prospekt Mira towards Novoyasenevskaya	Kaluzhsko-Rizhskaya line	Alekseyevskaya towards Medvedkovo
Maryina Roshcha anticlockwise / outer	Bolshaya Koltsevaya line transfer at Rizhskaya	Sokolniki clockwise / inner
Route map
Location
- Location within Moscow Metro

Rizhskaya (Russian: Рижская) is a Moscow Metro station in the Meshchansky District, North-Eastern Administrative Okrug, Moscow. It is on the Kaluzhsko-Rizhskaya Line, between Prospekt Mira and Alekseyevskaya stations. It is named after the nearby Rizhsky railway station (which was named after and serves trains to the Latvian capital, Riga) and was designed by Latvian architects Artūrs Reinfelds and Vaidelotis Apsītis.

The brightly coloured Latvian ceramics employed throughout the station make it instantly recognizable. The pylons, which follow the curve of the station tube, are faced with reddish-brown tile and sandwiched between piers faced with lemon yellow tile and decorated with gold-coloured cornices. The ventilation grilles above the pylons are decorated with the coat of arms of the Latvian SSR. The station opened on 1 May 1958.

The round vestibule, which was designed by S.M. Kravets, Yu.A. Kolesnikova, and G.E. Golubev, is located on the east side of Prospekt Mira at Rizhskaya Square.

The station reopened after reconstruction on 7 May 2022. A transfer to the Bolshaya Koltsevaya line at Rizhskaya was opened on 1 March 2023.

== 2004 terrorist bombing ==
The street outside of the entrance to the Rizhskaya station was the site of a terrorist attack by Chechen separatists that occurred shortly after 8 pm on 31 August 2004, in which a bomb was detonated killing 10 people and injuring another 50, some 30 of them seriously. The suicide bombing was thought initially to have been carried out by Roza Nagayeva, but she in fact took part in the Beslan school siege in North Ossetia that started the next day, and was herself killed when the school was stormed several days later.

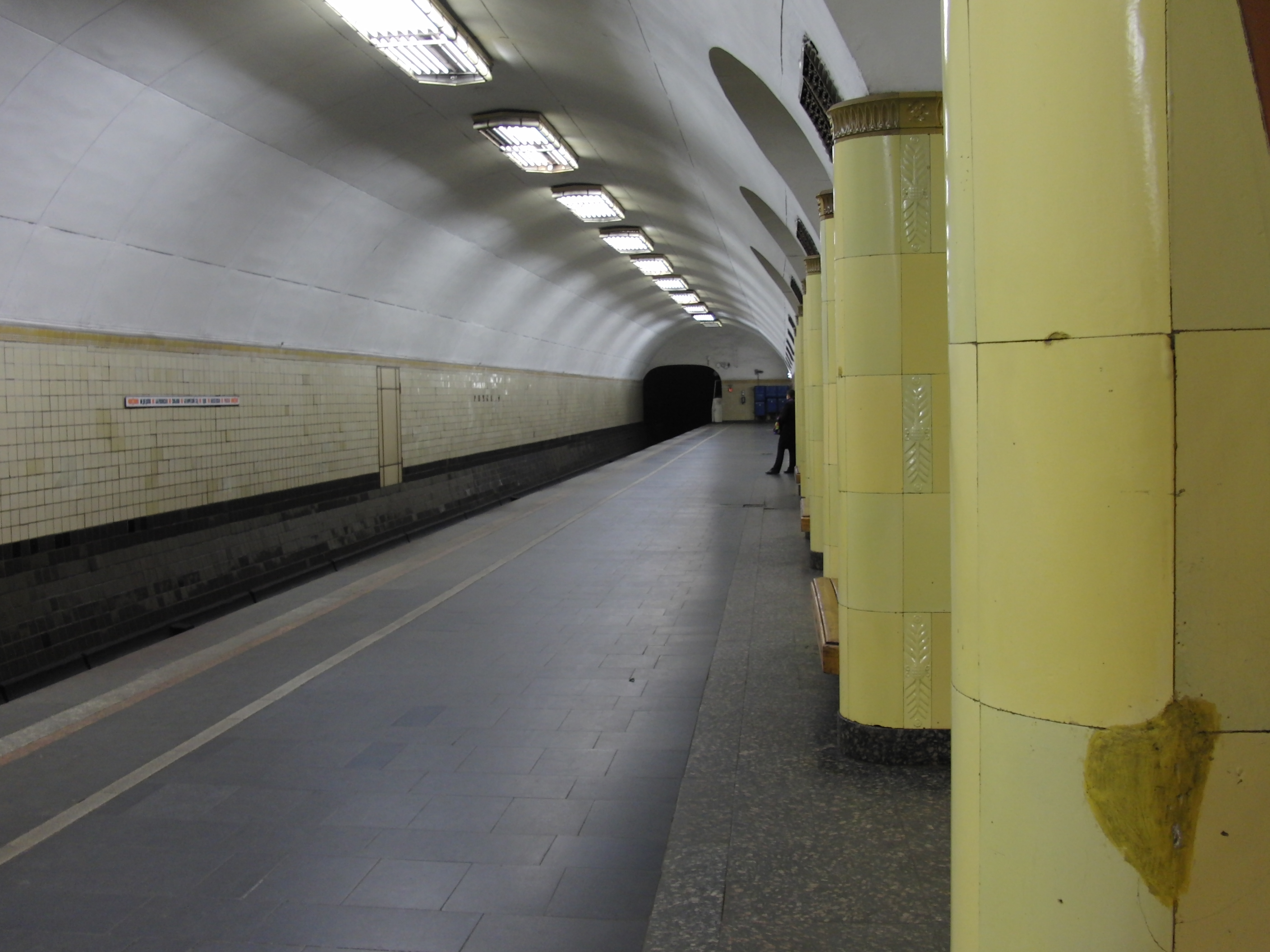
