= Komsomolets =

Komsomolets were male members of Komsomol, the former Soviet youth organization. The term may also refer to:

== Military ==
- Soviet submarine K-278 Komsomolets, a nuclear submarine which caught fire and sank off Norway
- Komsomolets-class torpedo boat, motor torpedo boat of World War II era
- Komsomolets armored tractor, Soviet prime mover vehicle

== Places ==
- Komsomolets Island, an island in the Russian Arctic
- Komsomolets (rural locality), several rural localities in Russia
- Mount Komsomolets, a mountain in Ala Archa National Park, Kyrgyzstan

== Other uses ==
- Komsomolets (camera), Soviet camera, a predecessor of Lubitel
- Moskovskij Komsomolets, a Moscow-based daily newspaper

== See also ==
- Komsomol (disambiguation)
- Komsomolsk (disambiguation)
- Komsomolsky (disambiguation)
