= Komsomolsky =

Komsomolsky (masculine), Komsomolskoye (neuter), Komsomolskaya (feminine) is a Russian word related to naming something after Komsomol.

A Ukrainian variant of the set is Komsomolskyi, Komsomolske, Komsomolska, which are eliminated in Ukraine as part of the decommunization process.

It may refer to:

Divisions

- Komsomolsky District, several districts in the countries of the former Soviet Union
- Komsomolskoye Urban Settlement, several municipal urban settlements in Russia
- Komsomolskoye Microdistrict, a part of the city of Kaliningrad, Russia

Populated places

- Komsomolsky, Russia (Komsomolskaya, Komsomolskoye), several inhabited localities in Russia
- Komsomolsky (Kostanay Region) (now 'Mereke'), village in Kazakhstan
- Komsomolskyi, Ukraine (Komsomolska, Komsomolske), several inhabited localities in Ukraine, which all were renamed since 2016 as part of the De-communization
  - Dubove, Luhansk Oblast (former Komsomolskyi), an urban-type settlement in Ukraine
  - Hrafske, Donetsk Oblast (former Komsomolskyi), an urban-type settlement in Ukraine
  - Lahidne (former Komsomolskyi), a settlement in Ukraine
  - Kalmiuske (former Komsomolske), a city in Donetsk Oblast, Ukraine
  - Slobozhanske (former Komsomolske), a city in Kharkiv Oblast, Ukraine
  - Bakachyk-Kyiat (former Komsomolske), a settlement in Crimea, Ukraine
  - Zapovidne (former Komsomolske), a settlement in Kirovohrad Oblast, Ukraine
  - Blahodarivka (former Komsomolske), a settlement in Mykolaiv Oblast, Ukraine
  - Sonino (former Komsomolske), a settlement in Kharkiv Oblast, Ukraine
  - Buzova (former Komsomolske), a settlement in Kharkiv Oblast, Ukraine
  - Myrolyubivka (former Komsomolske), a settlement in Kharkiv Oblast, Ukraine
  - Triychate (former Komsomolske), a settlement in Kharkiv Oblast, Ukraine
  - Petropavlivka (former Komsomolske), a settlement in Kherson Oblast, Ukraine
  - Dovzhyk (former Komsomolske), a settlement in Chernihiv Oblast, Ukraine
  - Orak Adzhi (former Komsomolske), a village in Crimea, Ukraine
  - Makhnivka (former Komsomolske), a village in Vinnytsia Oblast, Ukraine
  - Tsivky (former Komsomolske), a village in Dnipropetrovsk Oblast, Ukraine
  - Solontsi (former Komsomolske), a village in Dnipropetrovsk Oblast, Ukraine
  - Pokrovske (former Komsomolske), a village in Zhytomyr Oblast, Ukraine
  - Huliaypilske (former Komsomolske), a village in Zaporizhia Oblast, Ukraine
  - Stepove (former Komsomolske), a village in Zaporizhia Oblast, Ukraine
  - Blahodatne (former Komsomolske), a village in Mykolaiv Oblast, Ukraine
  - Pirky (former Komsomolske), a village in Poltava Oblast, Ukraine
  - Pototskivshchyna (former Komsomolske), a village in Poltava Oblast, Ukraine
  - Novoprosyanske (former Komsomolske), a village in Kharkiv Oblast, Ukraine
  - Dontsove (former Komsomolske), a village in Kherson Oblast, Ukraine

Metro stations

- Komsomolskaya (Koltsevaya Line), a station of the Moscow Metro, Moscow, Russia
- Komsomolskaya (Sokolnicheskaya Line), a station of the Moscow Metro, Moscow, Russia
- Komsomolskaya (Nizhny Novgorod Metro), a station of the Nizhny Novgorod Metro, Nizhny Novgorod, Russia
- Komsomolskaya (Volgograd Metrotram), a station of the Volgograd Metrotram, Volgograd, Russia
- Komsomolskaya, former name of Devyatkino, a station of the St. Petersburg Metro, Russia
- Komsomolska (Komsomolskaya), former name of Palats Sportu, a station of the Kharkiv Metro, Kharkiv, Ukraine
- Komsomolska (Komsomolskaya), former name of Chernihivska, a station of the Kyiv Metro, Kyiv, Ukraine
- Komsomolskaya, former name of Milliy Bog, a station of the Tashkent Metro, Tashkent, Uzbekistan

Other

- Komsomolskaya Square (Moscow), a square in central Moscow, Russia
- Komsomolskaya (Antarctic research station), a former Soviet research station in the Australian Antarctic Territory

== See also ==
- Komsomol (disambiguation)
- Komsomolets (disambiguation)
- Komsomolsk (disambiguation)
