= Komsomolskoye Urban Settlement =

Komsomolskoye Urban Settlement is the name of three municipal formations in Russia.

- Komsomolskoye Urban Settlement, a municipal formation which the town of Komsomolsk in Komsomolsky District of Ivanovo Oblast is incorporated as
- Komsomolskoye Urban Settlement, a municipal formation which the Urban-Type Settlement of Komsomolsk in Tisulsky District of Kemerovo Oblast is incorporated as
- Komsomolskoye Urban Settlement, a municipal formation which the Work Settlement of Komsomolsky in Chamzinsky District of the Republic of Mordovia is incorporated as

== See also ==
- Komsomolsky (disambiguation)
