= Komsomolsk =

Komsomolsk may refer to:

== Places ==
- Komsomolsk-on-Amur, a city in Khabarovsk Krai, Russia
- Komsomolsk-na-Amure Urban Okrug, a municipal formation which the city of krai significance of Komsomolsk-on-Amur in Khabarovsk Krai, Russia is incorporated as
- Komsomolsk, Russia, several inhabited localities in Russia
- Horishni Plavni, a city in Poltava Oblast, Ukraine formerly called Komsomolsk
- Komsomolsk, a former city in 1930-1944 that merged into Horlivka, Ukraine
- Nimetska Mokra, a village in Zakarpattia Oblast, Ukraine formerly called Komsomolsk
- Gongqingcheng, a city in Jiangxi, China, whose name also means "Communist Youth League city"

== Other ==
- Komsomolsk (film), a 1938 Soviet drama film directed by Sergei Gerasimov
- FC Hirnyk-Sport Komsomolsk, Ukrainian association football club
- Комсомольск (band) is an indie rock band from Moscow, Russia

== See also ==
- Komsomol (disambiguation)
- Komsomolets (disambiguation)
- Komsomolsky (disambiguation)
