= Kaluzhsko-Rizhskaya line =

Moscow Metro line

Overview
- Owner: Moskovsky Metropoliten
- Locale: Moscow
- Termini: Novoyasenevskaya (southwest); Medvedkovo (northeast)
- Stations: 24

Service
- Type: Rapid transit
- System: Moscow Metro
- Operator: Moskovsky Metropoliten
- Rolling stock: 81-765/766/767; 81-765.3/766.3/767.3; 81-765.4/766.4/767.4; 81-775/776/777
- Daily ridership: 1,283,024

History
- Opened: 1 May 1958; 68 years ago
- Last extension: 1990

Technical
- Line length: 37.8 kilometres (23.5 mi)
- Character: Underground
- Track gauge: 1,520 mm (4 ft 11 27/32 in)
- Electrification: Third rail

The Kaluzhsko-Rizhskaya line (Russian: Калу́жско-Ри́жская ли́ния, IPA: [kɐˈɫuʂskə ˈrʲiʂskəjə ˈlʲinʲɪjə]) (Line 6; Orange Line) is a line of the Moscow Metro, that originally existed as two separate radial lines, Rizhskaya and Kaluzhskaya opened in 1958 and 1962, respectively. Only in 1971 were they united into a single line as the central section connecting the stations Oktyabrskaya to Prospekt Mira was completed. It was also the first line in Moscow to have a cross-platform transfer. The Rizhsky radius is roughly aligned with a northern avenue Prospekt Mira, while the Kaluzhskiy radius generally follows a southwestern street Profsoyuznaya Ulitsa. Presently, the Kaluzhsko-Rizhskaya line is the third busiest in the Moscow Metro system with a passenger traffic rate of 1.015 million per day. It has a bi-directional length of 37.8 kilometres (23.5 mi), and a travel time of 56 minutes, typically it is coloured orange on Metro maps and numbered 6.

== History ==
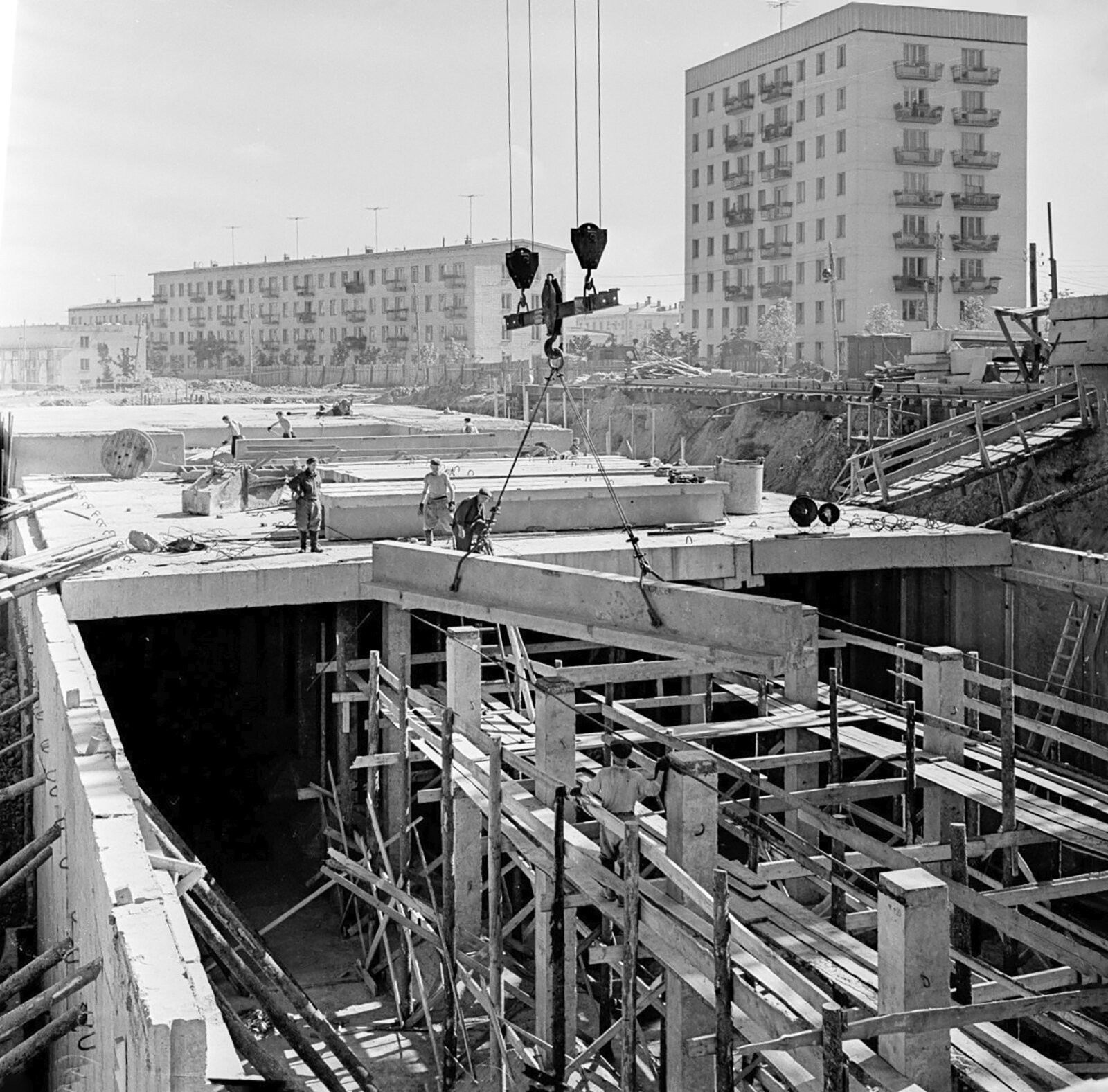
Cut-and-cover construction of Akademicheskaya station (1960)

The Kaluzhsko-Rizhskaya line was the first one in Moscow to be built in the time of the new epoch, when contrary to the old time-consuming manual work that produced the most famous stations in the system the De-Stalinization policies of Nikita Khrushchev forced the modernisation and development of new saving techniques.

=== Rizhskaya ===
Nonetheless the overall layout of the Metro was completed in 1954 when the ring became fully operational. Moscow Metro planners immediately drew new areas of development which would come in radii starting at the ring. The first such radius became the Rizhskaya, which would expand northwards from the Botanichesky Sad (now Prospekt Mira) station along the Mira avenue past the Rizhsky Rail Terminal and terminate at the newly built All-Russia Exhibition Centre. Construction began in the mid 1950s and in 1958 the first four stations of the new radius opened. Already the first stations show a clear transition away from the Stalinist elements in architecture, where it is obvious how the original project was altered to make it simpler and aesthetic. New construction methods, such as shortening the station vault diameters from 9.5 to 8.5 metres (31 ft 2 in to 27 ft 11 in) and new element junction methods dramatically reduced the building time.

=== Kaluzhskaya ===
On the opposite end of the ring, a second new radius was planned to be built – Kaluzhskaya, which would follow on a southeast contour to the first newly built Cheryomushki bedroom districts made from Khrushchyovka houses. Like the cheap buildings it expanded into the Kaluzhsky radius was made completely of any decorative architecture whatsoever. For the first time a joint project for a sub-surface station – the Sorkonozhka (Centipede) was created. Consisting of an enclosed concrete prism, it featured two supporting rows of pillars for the ceiling. The original design was standardised to the point where stations differed only in the colour of marble on the pillars and the ceramic tiling patterns of the walls. However the method allowed for even further increase in construction methods. A rational combination of using deep-level shield tunnels and a sub-surface station pit allowed for this, and would become the most widely used technique in many ex-USSR metro systems. In 1962 the Kaluzhskaya line was opened, and in 1964 it had its first extension to the new Kaluzhskoye depot where a temporary surface station was opened.

=== Transfer points ===
Originally it was thought that the two radii could exist on their own and terminate at the ring; however, the dynamic passenger inflow immediately made the Metro planners realise the mistake. To correct this, it was decided to link the radii to a diameter and relieve the ring by allowing several transfer points inside the circumference. In 1970 the first extension northwards from Oktyabrskaya took place where the line met up with the Tagansko-Krasnopresnenskaya line at Kitay-gorod, for the first time, a combined cross-platform transfer was opened with both stations built simultaneously. Finally, at the end of 1971, the lines linked up with the central section forming the Kaluzhsko-Rizhskaya line. The two stations that formed the final junction used a new method of mounting hydroisolation, which was made separately and then suspended instead of mounting it piece by piece. This allowed a three-month work to be finished in little more than a week.

=== Extension projects ===
North

After the joining of the radii the line became a full transport artery. Several more extension projects were carried out. A northern one opened in 1978 and finally allowed the late Soviet decorative architecture to blossom. At four stations long, it extended past the Russian Botanical Gardens into the new northern districts of Babushkinsky and Medvedkovo. The extension also featured a new depot. Part of the track lies across Yauza River though passengers can not see it as the track bridge is a covered tunnel.

South

At the same time several projects on the southern radius took place. In 1974 the temporary depot station was closed and the line expanded into Belyayevo. In 1980 Shabolovskaya was opened between Oktyabrskaya and Leninsky Prospekt stations. The original stretch was built under very difficult geological conditions, with pressure as much as 2.3 bars. The planned deep-level station was abandoned due to difficulties in building an escalator tunnel. However, in 1980 the continued development in engineering techniques allowed for this to finish and the station was opened without any disruption to the service.

Southwest

In the late 1980s, work began on the final section in the southwest, to the new suburbs of Konkovo and Yasenevo, finally reaching the edge of the Bitsa Park in 1990.

=== Timeline ===
Segment	Date opened	Length
Prospekt Mira–VDNKh	1 May 1958	4.5 km
Novye Cheryomushki–Kaluzhskaya (temporary)	15 April 1962	14.1 km
Oktyabrskaya–Novye Cheryomushki	13 October 1962	12.6 km
Oktyabrskaya–Kitay-gorod	30 December 1970	3.1 km
Prospekt Mira–Kitay-gorod	31 December 1971	3.1 km
Novye Cheryomushki-Belyayevo	12 August 1974	2.2 km
VDNKh-Medvedkovo	29 September 1978	8.1 km
Shabolovskaya	6 November 1980	N/A
Belyayevo–Tyoply Stan	6 November 1987	2.9 km
Tyoply Stan–Novoyasenevskaya	17 January 1990	3.6 km
Total		37.8 km

=== Name changes ===
Station	Previous name(s)	Years
VDNKh	VSKhV	1958–1959
Alekseyevskaya	Mir	1958–1966
Alekseyevskaya	Scherbakovskaya	1966–1990
Prospekt Mira	Botanicheskiy Sad	1958–1966
Sukharevskaya	Kolkhoznaya	1972–1990
Kitay-gorod	Ploshchad Nogina	1971–1990
Tretyakovskaya	Novokuznetskaya	1971–1983
Novoyasenevskaya	Bittsevsky Park	1990–2008

== Transfers ==
#	Transfer to	At
1	Sokolnicheskaya line	Turgenevskaya
2	Zamoskvoretskaya line	Tretyakovskaya
5	Koltsevaya line	Prospekt Mira, Oktyabrskaya
7	Tagansko-Krasnopresnenskaya line	Kitay-gorod
8	Kalininskaya line	Tretyakovskaya
10	Lyublinsko-Dmitrovskaya line	Turgenevskaya
11	Bolshaya Koltsevaya line	Rizhskaya, Kaluzhskaya
L1	Butovskaya line	Novoyasenevskaya
14	Moscow Central Circle	Botanichesky Sad, Leninsky Prospekt
	Troitskaya line	Akademicheskaya
Rail	Rizhskoe direction Kurskoye direction Belorusskoye direction	Rizhskaya

== Rolling stock ==
The line is served by two depots, Kaluzhskoe (№ 5) and Sviblovo (№ 10). Most of the trains are 81–717.5/714.5 models which were received new from 1987, however 12 of them are the new 81-717.5M/714.5M which were added to Sviblovo's park in 1996/1997. In 2017, the Moscow Metro began replacing the 81–717.5/714.5 and 81-717.5M/714.5M models with 81-760/761s (Oka). The 81-760/761s stopped being used on the line on 22 August 2018. In 2018, Moscow Mayor Sergey Sobyanin announced that the next-generation 81-765/766/767 (Moscow) trains would operate on the line from 2019, and within five to six years the old rolling stock would be entirely replaced. In May 2018, the first 81-765/766/767 train began operating on the line, ahead of schedule. In December 2020, the first 81-775/776/777 train began operating on the line.

Subway car types used on the line over the years:

Type	Dates
Series G	1958 - 1982
Series E, Ezh, Em-508 and Em-509	1972 - 1996
Series 81-717/714	1987 - 2023
Series 81-717.5/714.5	1989 - 2023
Series 81-717.5M/714.5M	1993 - 2022
Series 81-760/761	2017 - 2018
Series 81-760A/761A/763A	2018
Series 81-765/766/767	2018–present
Series 81-765.3/766.3/767.3	2018–present
Series 81-765.4/766.4/767.4	2019–present
Series 81-775/776/777	2020–present

== Recent developments and future plans ==
Currently the line spans through the entire city and no extensions are planned in the nearby future. However several projects exist. The first one was to connect the town of Mytishchi in the Moscow Oblast with the Moscow Metro, this was however declared unnecessary by the mayor of the city. Another one was to extend from Bitsevsky Park to Annino of the Serpukhovsko-Timiryazevskaya line, however it is unlikely this will be realized due to the preserved area of the Bitsa Park, and a newer project to bring the Butovskaya Light Metro line to the southern radius.

The lack of transfer to the Serpukhovsko-Timiryazevskaya line has led to a plan to build Yakimanka station between Oktyabrskaya and Tretyakovskaya, which will offer a transfer to Polyanka.

Several projects also exist to modernize the older stations. A second entrance was added to VDNKh in 1997 and Akademicheskaya has had a restoration of its ceramic tiled walls replacing them with aluminium planes. Recently it has emerged that the Moscow circular railway will be converted into a form of urban transport. If so then the conserved transfer from Leninsky Prospekt to the railway station Ploschad Gagarina will be opened.
