= Komsomol, Salyan =

Komsomol
- Location within Azerbaijan
- Coordinates: 39°31′23″N 49°00′18″E
- Country: Azerbaijan
- Rayon: Salyan
- Time zone: UTC+4 (AZT)
  - Summer (DST): UTC+5 (AZT)

Komsomol (also, Arab-Gardashbeyli) is a village in the Salyan Rayon of Azerbaijan.
