= Komsomolskaya (Koltsevaya line) =

Moscow Metro station

Komsomolskaya Комсомольская
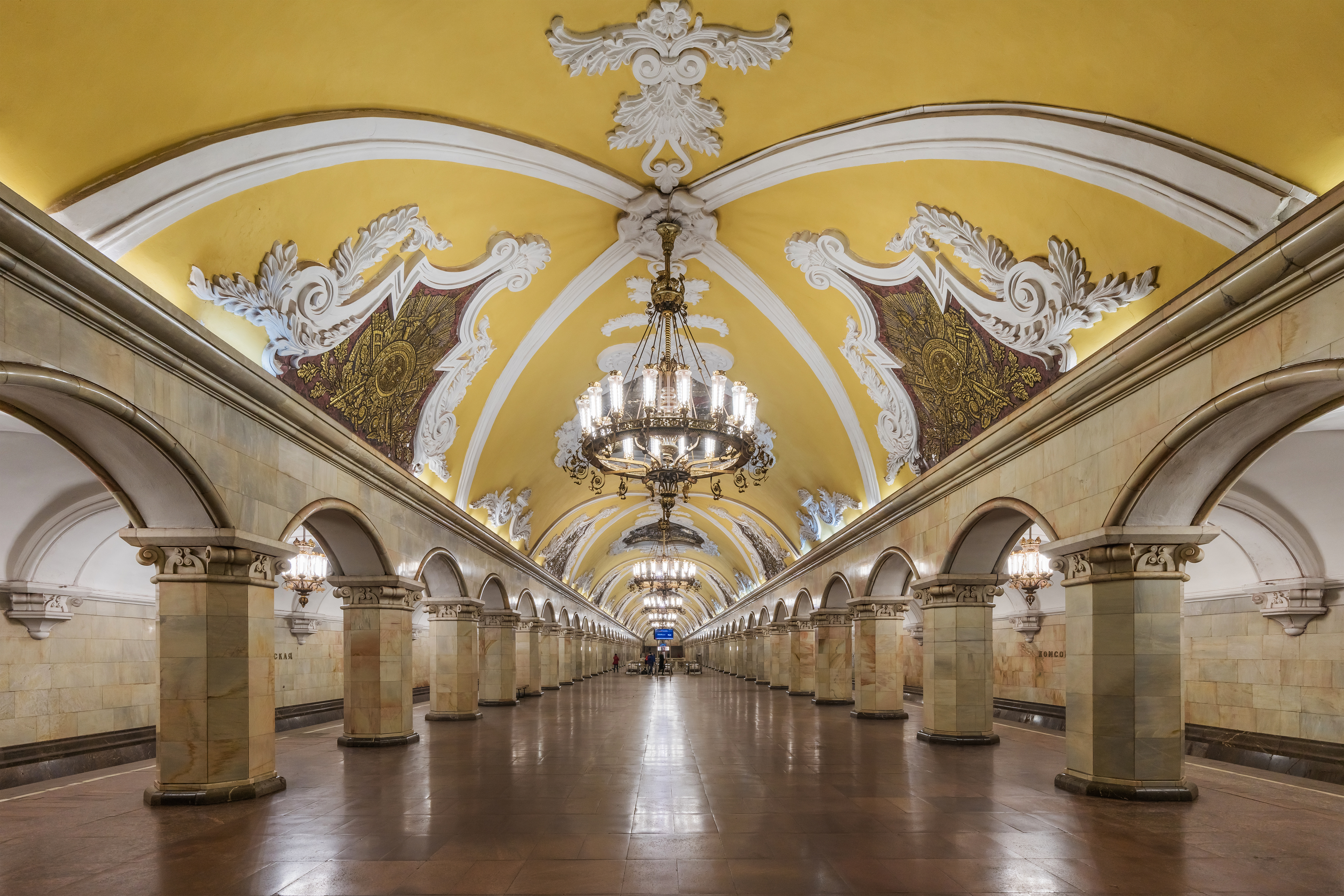
- station hall

General information
- Location: Komsomolskaya Square; Krasnoselsky District; Central Administrative Okrug; Moscow; Russia
- Coordinates: 55.7748°N 37.6549°E
- System: Moscow Metro station
- Owner: Moskovsky Metropoliten
- Line: Koltsevaya line
- Platforms: 1 island platform
- Tracks: 2
- Connections: Leningradsky Rail Terminal; Yaroslavsky Rail Terminal; Kazansky Rail Terminal Tram: 7, 13, 37, 50; Bus: A, т14, т41, 40, 122; Trolleybus: T

Construction
- Structure type: Deep column tri-vault
- Depth: 37 metres (121 ft)
- Platform levels: 1
- Parking: No

Other information
- Station code: 070

History
- Opened: 30 January 1952; 74 years ago

Passengers
- 2009: 54,469,315

Services
Preceding station	Moscow Metro	Following station
Prospekt Mira anticlockwise / outer	Koltsevaya line	Kurskaya clockwise / inner
Krasnye Vorota towards Potapovo	Sokolnicheskaya line transfer at Komsomolskaya	Krasnoselskaya towards Bulvar Rokossovskogo
Route map
Location
- Location within Central Moscow

Komsomolskaya (Russian: Комсомо́льская) is a Moscow Metro station in the Krasnoselsky District, Central Administrative Okrug, Moscow. It is on the Koltsevaya line, between Prospekt Mira and Kurskaya stations.

The station is located under the busiest Moscow transport hub, Komsomolskaya Square, which serves Leningradsky, Yaroslavsky, and Kazansky railway terminals. Because of that, the station is one of the busiest in the whole system. It opened on 30 January 1952 as a part of the second stage of the line.

== Evolution of the design ==
Stations on the first southern segment of the Koltsevaya line were dedicated to the victory over Nazi Germany, while those on the northern segment (Belorusskaya-Koltsevaya to Komsomolskaya) were dedicated to the theme of post-war labour. Komsomolskaya was designed by Alexey Shchusev as an illustration of a historical speech given by Joseph Stalin November 7, 1941. In the speech, Stalin evoked the memories of Alexander Nevsky, Dmitry Donskoy and other military leaders of the past, and all these historical figures eventually appeared on the mosaics of Komsomolskaya.

The early roots of the station's design can be traced to a 1944 draft by Shchusev implemented in pure Petrine baroque, a local adaptation of the 17th century Dutch Golden Age. However, after the end of World War II the drafts of 1944 were discarded and the stations of the Koltsevaya line were completed in the mainstream late Stalinist style of the period. Shchusev, who died in 1949, retained his baroque nonce order.

Komsomolskaya remained Shchusev's first and only metro station design. The station was initially planned as a traditional deep pylon type. Later, Shchusev replaced the heavy concrete pylons with narrow octagonal steel columns, riveted with marble tiles, creating the larger open space.

After Shchusev's death, the station was completed by Viktor Kokorin, A. Zabolotnaya, V. Varvarin and O. Velikoretsky and Pavel Korin, the creator of the mosaics. Since 2007, an additional second exit from the station has been proposed, although it has been continuously postponed with the last update being in 2018 when it was announced that it was decided to accelerate the build time for the second exit and complete it by 2022.

== Architecture and decoration ==
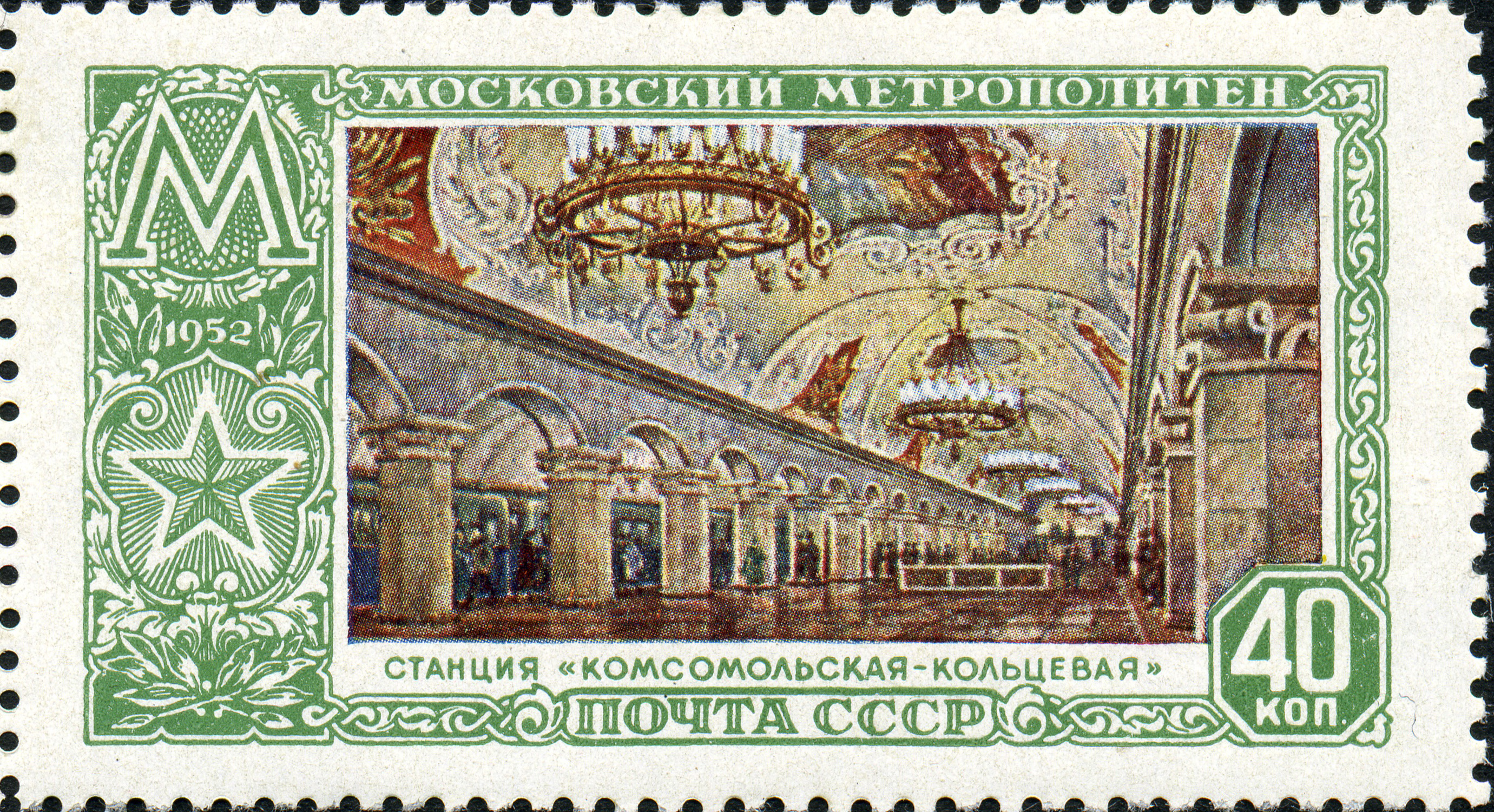
Interior on a 1952 stamp

Beginning with the large vestibule located among the former of the two train stations, the building features a large octagonal dome topped by a cupola, and a spire crowned by a large star and imposing full-height portico with stylised Corinthian columns. Inside amid the Baroque-style ornaments, rich torchères and chandelier lights, two escalators descend, one leading to the old 1935 Komsomolskaya-Radialnaya station, and the second to this one.

On the platform level, there is a Baroque ceiling, with accompanying friezes, painted yellow. Supporting the enlarged barrel vault are 68 octagonal columns faced with white marble, and topped with baroque pilasters. The platform is lit up by chandeliers and additional concealed elements in the niches of both the central and platform halls.

The theme of the design, the Historical Russian fight for freedom and independence, is expressed in eight large ceiling mosaics by Pavel Korin. Korin said that the inspiration came from Joseph Stalin's speech at the Moscow Parade of 1941, where he inspired the soldiers amid the catastrophic losses in the early period of World War II to remember the historical heroics of their Russian forefathers. The idea to design the art as a mosaic came from the Saint Sophia Cathedral in Kyiv, where Korin saw that such artforms could last for eternity. Chronologically the mosaics are as following:

- 1242: Alexander Nevsky after the Battle on the Ice.
- 1380: Dmitry Donskoy after the Battle of Kulikovo.
- 1612: Kuzma Minin and Dmitry Pozharsky after the end of the Time of Troubles.
- 1799: Alexander Suvorov after the Crossing of the Alps.
- 1812: Mikhail Kutuzov after the Battle of Borodino.
- 1945: The original mosaic here was of Red Army troops on Red Square receiving the Guards banner from Soviet army command, but because it contained images of some commanders whose careers and legacy would later be re-evaluated (including Joseph Stalin) most of the mosaic was replaced with that of Vladimir Lenin addressing a meeting in Red Square, thus moving the date of the artwork to a period between 1917 and 1922.
- 1945: Soviet Troops on the Reichstag building after the Battle of Berlin (according to some, the original banner had superimposed profiles of Lenin and Stalin: the latter was removed to leave just Lenin remaining).
- 1945: The original image was of a Victory parade with Soviet soldiers throwing captured Nazi banners in front of Lenin's Mausoleum. However, for the same reason as the sixth image, this image was retouched on several occasions. When Lavrenty Beria was arrested in 1953, his glasses were erased and then the whole figure was removed. Then in 1957, after the political crisis saw the end of the careers of Vyacheslav Molotov and Lazar Kaganovich, their images followed suit. Finally, after 1961 brought the end of Stalin's personality cult, in early 1963 the whole panel was taken down, and Korin redesigned it by placing a maiden (symbolising Mother Russia) standing on the Nazi banners in front of the same mausoleum, holding a hammer and sickle in one hand and a palm branch in the other. This mosaic is made of more than 300,000 tiles, takes up 31.5 square metres (339 sq ft) and weighs more than three tonnes.

In between each of the main mosaics there are smaller ones made of gilded smalt depicting various weaponry and armour. One set is focused on ancient Russian equipment, a second on the Napoleonic era, and the third on World War II. At the end of the platform is a bust of Vladimir Lenin under an arch decorated with gilt floral designs and the Coat of arms of the Soviet Union.

In the centre of the red granite covered platform are two passageways, surrounded by marble balustrades with escalators that descend into a lobby with a main escalator tunnel upwards to the Sokolnicheskaya line's Komsomolskaya station. On the wall opposite the escalator is a large fluorescent mosaic, also of Pavel Korin, depicting the Order of Victory surrounded by red and green banners and Georgian colours.

In 1951 both Pavel Korin and Alexey Schusev were posthumously awarded the Stalin Prize for their work on the station, and on 30 January 1952 the station was opened to the public as the first on the second stage of the Koltsevaya line. In 1958 the station was awarded the Grand Prix ("Grand Prize") title of Expo '58 in Brussels.

== Gallery ==
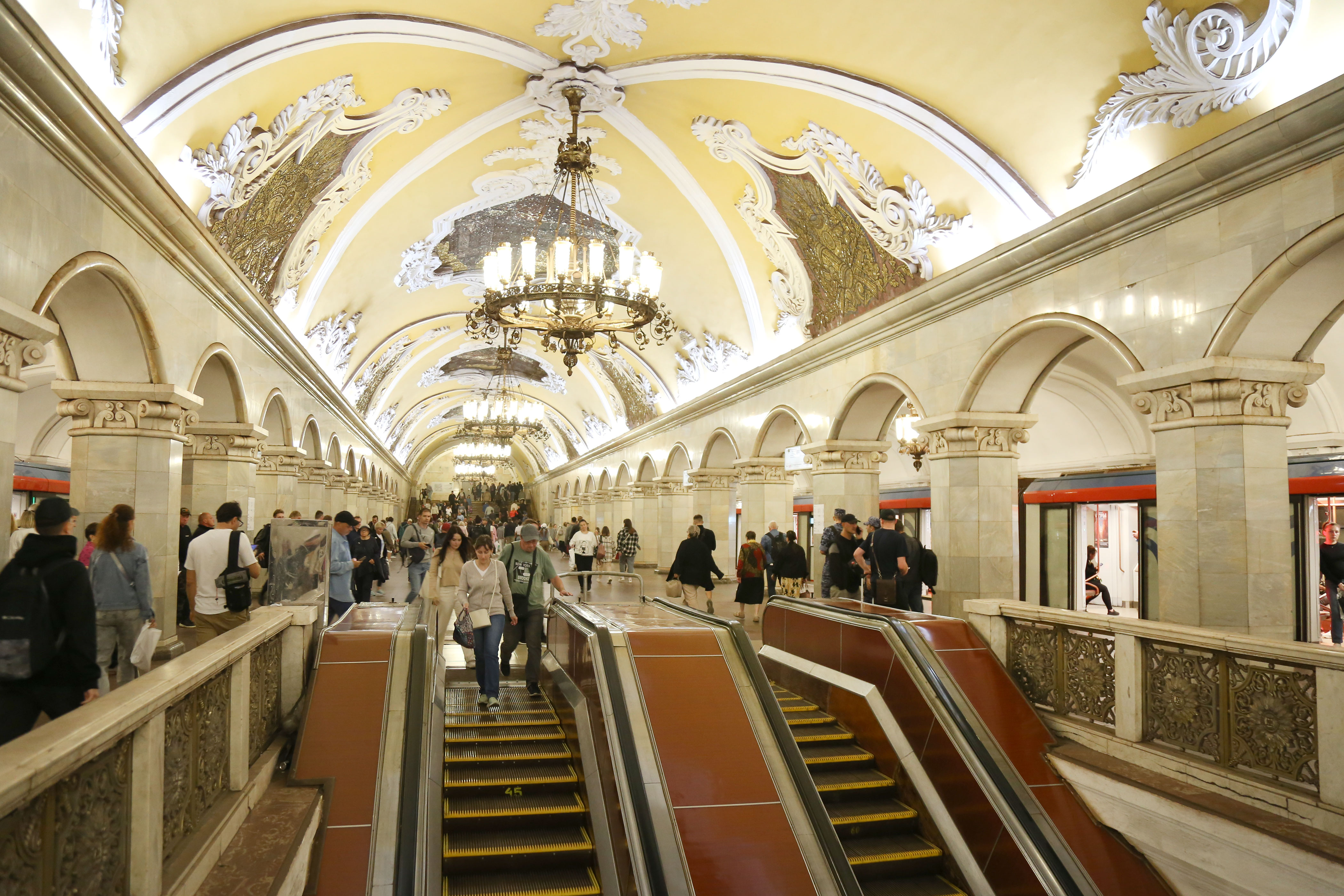
Komsomolskaya Station, Moscow, Russia

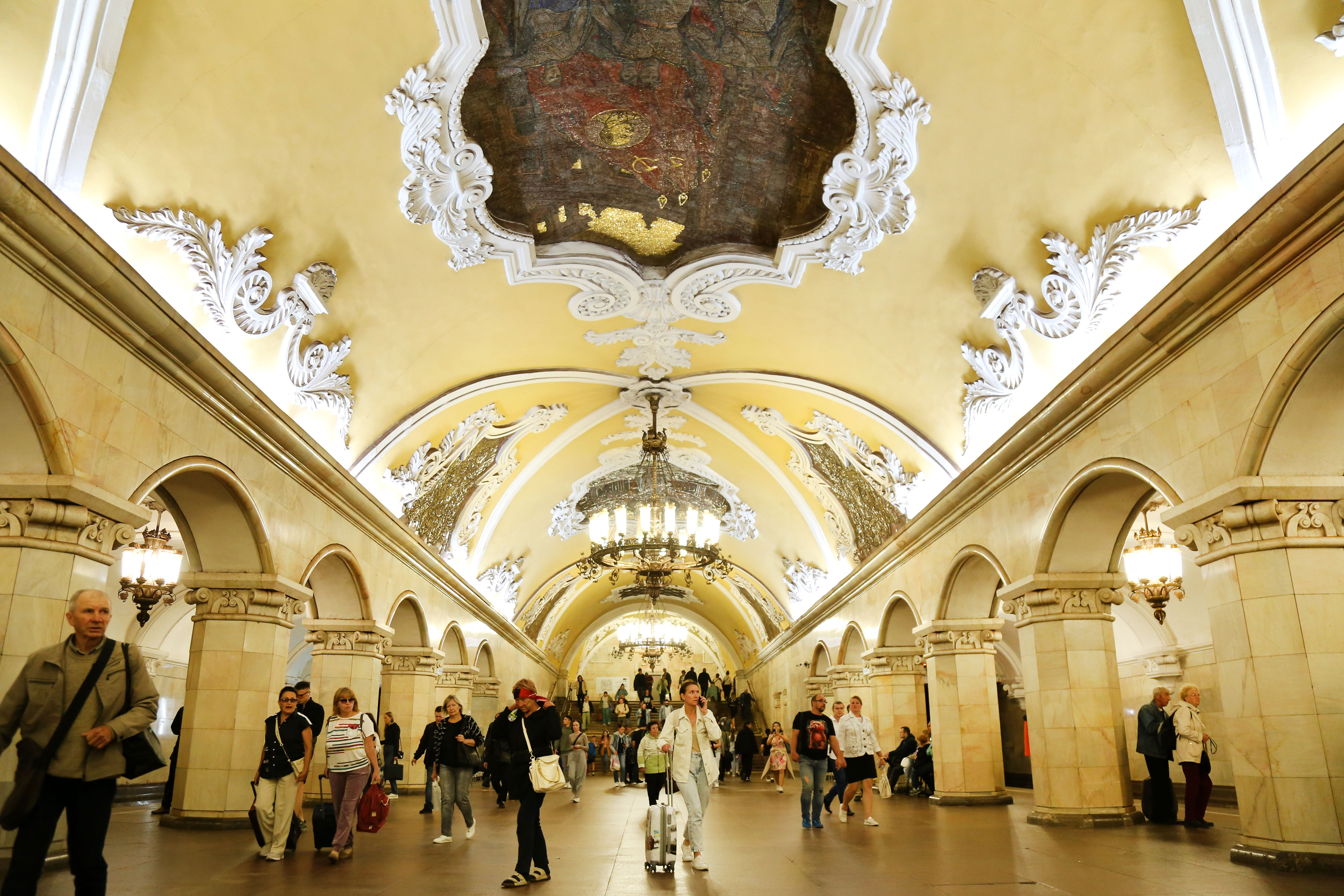
Komsomolskaya Station, Moscow, Russia

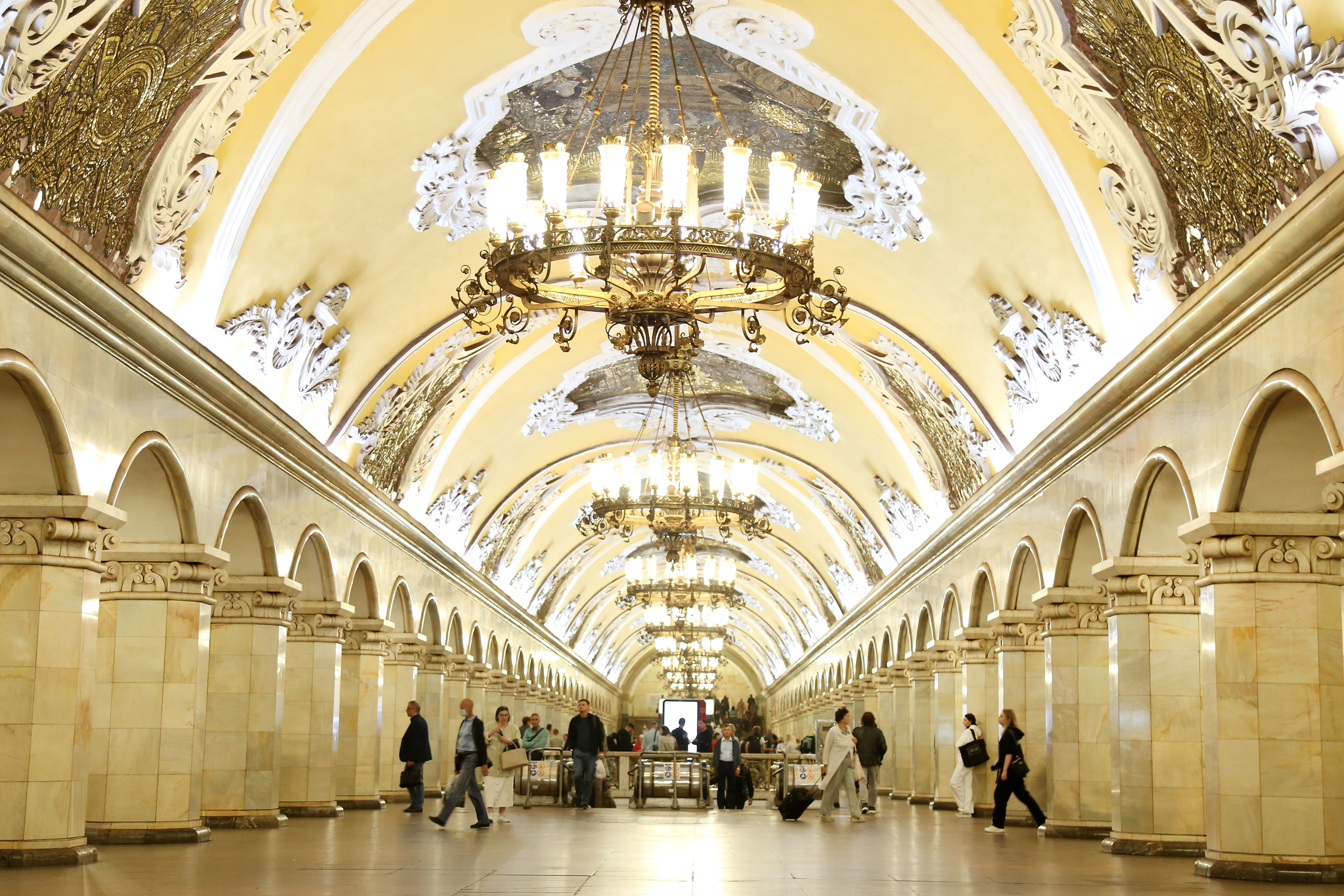
Komsomolskaya Station, Moscow, Russia
