= Medvedkovo (Moscow Metro) =

Moscow Metro station

Medvedkovo Медведково
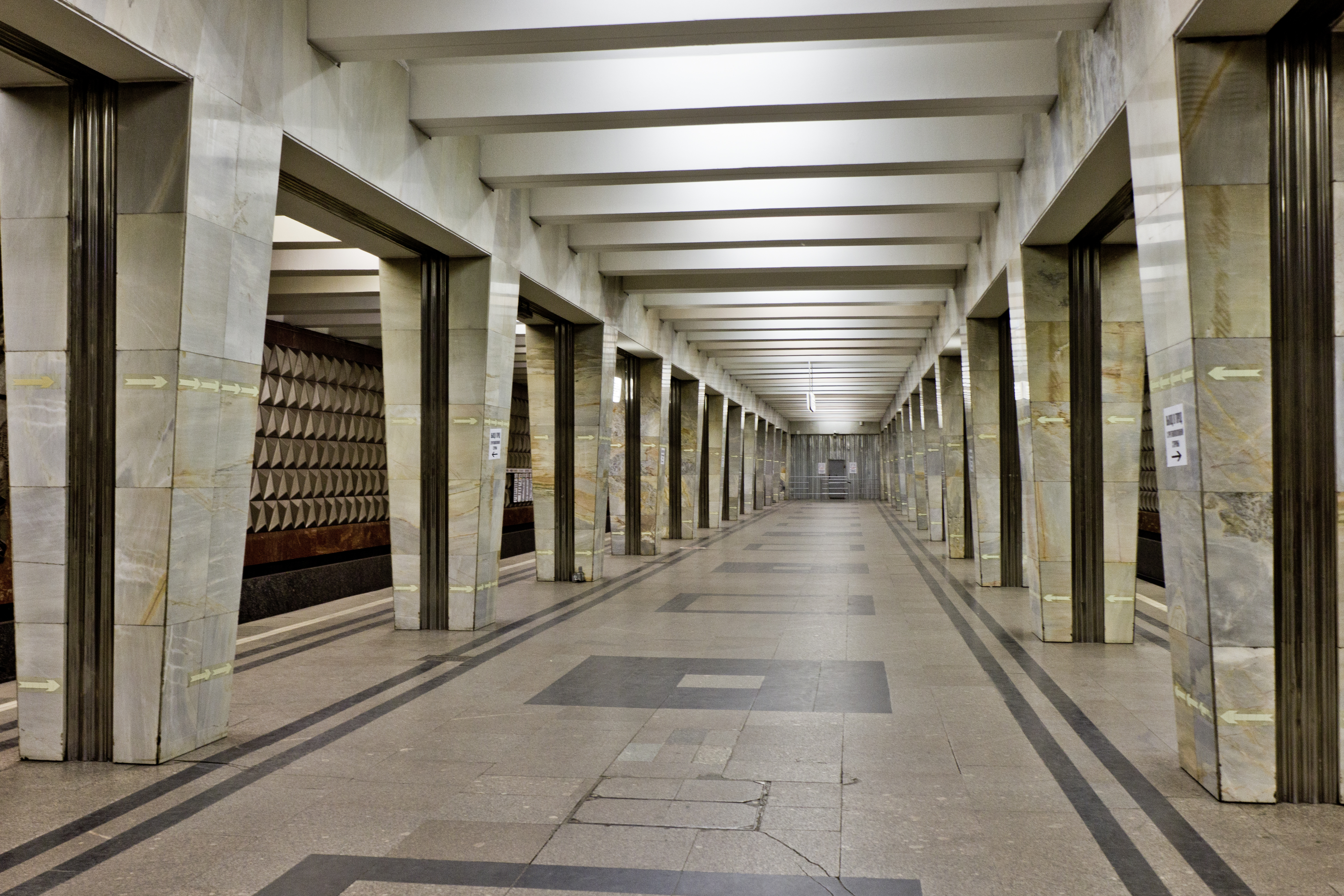

General information
- Location: Severnoye Medvedkovo District; North-Eastern Administrative Okrug; Moscow; Russia
- Coordinates: 55.8872°N 37.6613°E
- System: Moscow Metro station
- Owner: Moskovsky Metropoliten
- Line: Kaluzhsko-Rizhskaya line
- Platforms: 1
- Tracks: 2

Construction
- Structure type: Shallow pillar tri-span
- Depth: 10 metres (33 ft)
- Platform levels: 1
- Parking: No

Other information
- Station code: 086

History
- Opened: 29 September 1978; 47 years ago

Passengers
- 2009: 27,646,925

Services
Preceding station	Moscow Metro	Following station
Babushkinskaya towards Novoyasenevskaya	Kaluzhsko-Rizhskaya line	Terminus
Route map
Location
- Location within Moscow Metro

Medvedkovo (Russian: Медведково) is a Moscow Metro station in Severnoye Medvedkovo District, North-Eastern Administrative Okrug, Moscow. It is on the Kaluzhsko-Rizhskaya Line serving as its northeastern terminus. The station opened on 29 September 1978.

== Design ==
The architects Nina Aleshina and Natalya Samoilova designed Medvedkovo station. It features flared pillars faced with pinkish marble and strips of stainless steel. The outer walls of the station are coated with red marble and interlocking triangles of anodized aluminum punctuated with plaques by M. Alekseev depicting northern wildlife.

Entrances to the station are located on either side of Shirokaya street just west of Grekova Street.
