= Botanichesky Sad =

Botanichesky Sad:

== Moscow Metro ==
- Botanichesky Sad (Kaluzhsko-Rizhskaya Line) is a station of the Kaluzhsko-Rizhskaya Line of the Moscow Metro.
- Botanichesky Sad (Moscow Central Circle)
- Botanichesky Sad, name of the Prospekt Mira station of the Koltsevaya Line of Moscow Metro between 1952 and 1966
- Botanichesky Sad, name of the Prospekt Mira station of the Kaluzhsko-Rizhskaya Line of Moscow Metro between 1958 and 1966

== Other metro ==
- Botanichesky Sad (Novosibirsk Metro)
- Botanichesky Sad (Kharkiv Metro)

== Other ==
- Botanichesky Sad (film) by Vladimir Gostyukhin

== See also ==
- Botanical garden, Botanichesky Sad (Ботанический сад) means Botanical Garden in the Russian language
