= Rostokino =

Rostokino is the name of a district in Moscow, Russia, formerly a village with the same name. It may refer to:

- Rostokino Aqueduct, a stone aqueduct in Moscow
- Rostokino District, an administrative district in North-Eastern Administrative Okrug of the federal city of Moscow
- Rostokino (Little Ring of the Moscow Railway), a railway station of the Little Ring of the Moscow Railway
- Rostokino (Moscow Central Circle), a railway station of the Moscow Metro
- Rostokino (Yaroslavsky suburban direction), formerly Severyanin, a railway station of Yaroslavsky suburban direction of the Moscow Railway
