= Botanichesky Sad (Kaluzhsko-Rizhskaya line) =

Moscow Metro station

Botanichesky Sad Ботанический сад
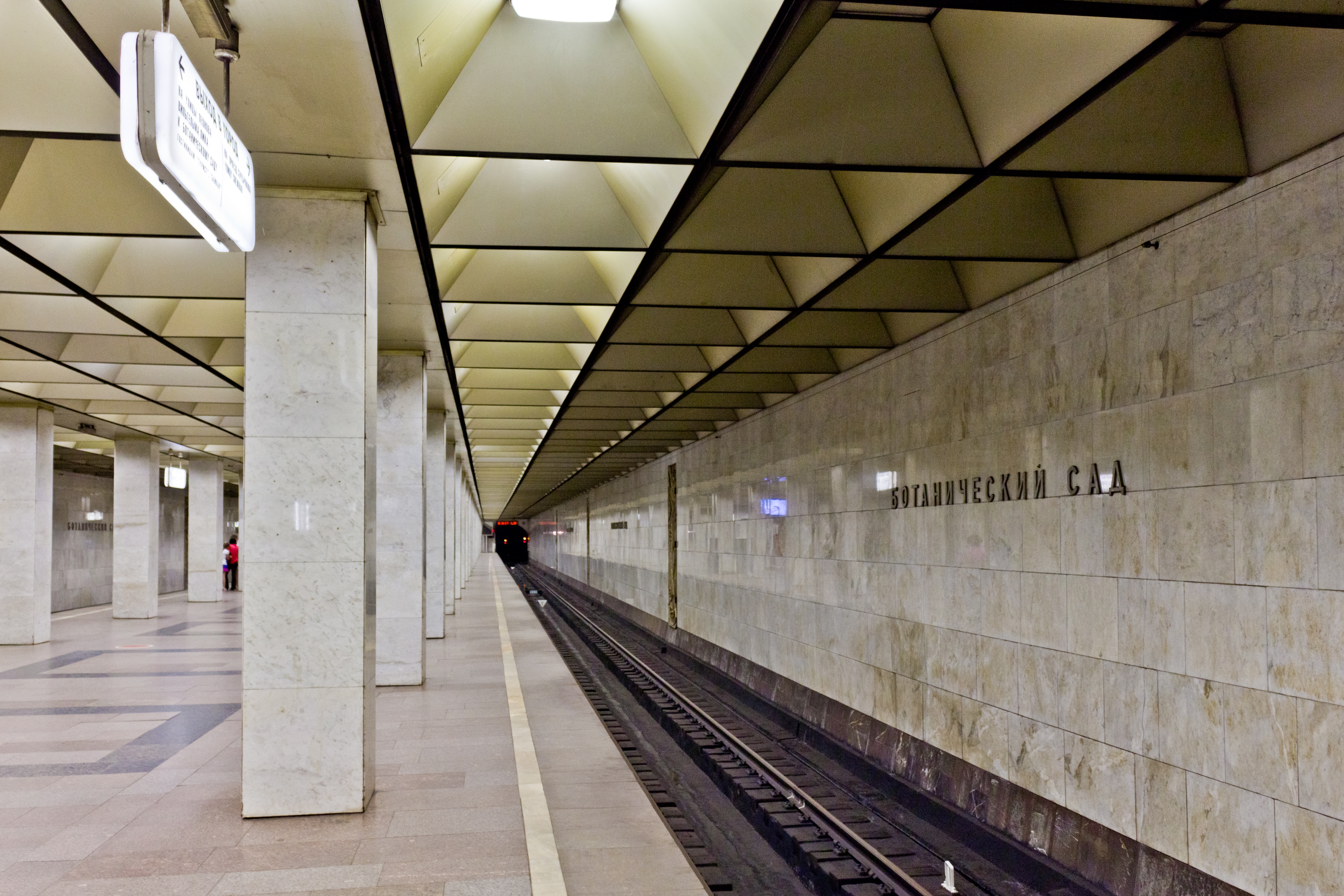

General information
- Coordinates: 55.8449°N 37.6383°E
- System: Moscow Metro station
- Owner: Moskovsky Metropoliten
- Line: Kaluzhsko-Rizhskaya line
- Platforms: 1 island platform
- Tracks: 2
- Connections: Bus: 33, 61, 71, 134, 154, 185, 195, 603, 628, 789

Construction
- Depth: 7 metres (23 ft)
- Platform levels: 1
- Parking: No

Other information
- Station code: 089

History
- Opened: 29 September 1978; 47 years ago

Passengers
- 2009: 11,971,270 ▼13.98%

Services
Preceding station	Moscow Metro	Following station
VDNKh towards Novoyasenevskaya	Kaluzhsko-Rizhskaya line	Sviblovo towards Medvedkovo
Out-of-station interchange
Vladykino anticlockwise / outer	Moscow Central Circle transfer at Botanichesky Sad	Rostokino clockwise / inner
Route map
Location
- Location within Moscow Metro

Botanichesky Sad (Russian: Ботани́ческий сад) is a Moscow Metro station in Rostokino District, North-Eastern Administrative Okrug, Moscow. It is on the Kaluzhsko–Rizhskaya line, between VDNKh and Sviblovo stations.

Botanichesky Sad opened on 29 September 1978 along with a northwest ward extension of the Rizhsky radius. The station is named after the Moscow Botanical Garden of Academy of Sciences. The name is somewhat confusing as the garden is near the entrance of the Vladykino station, but it takes a 10– 15 minute walk to get to the Botanical Garden from the Botanichesky Sad metro station.

== Building ==
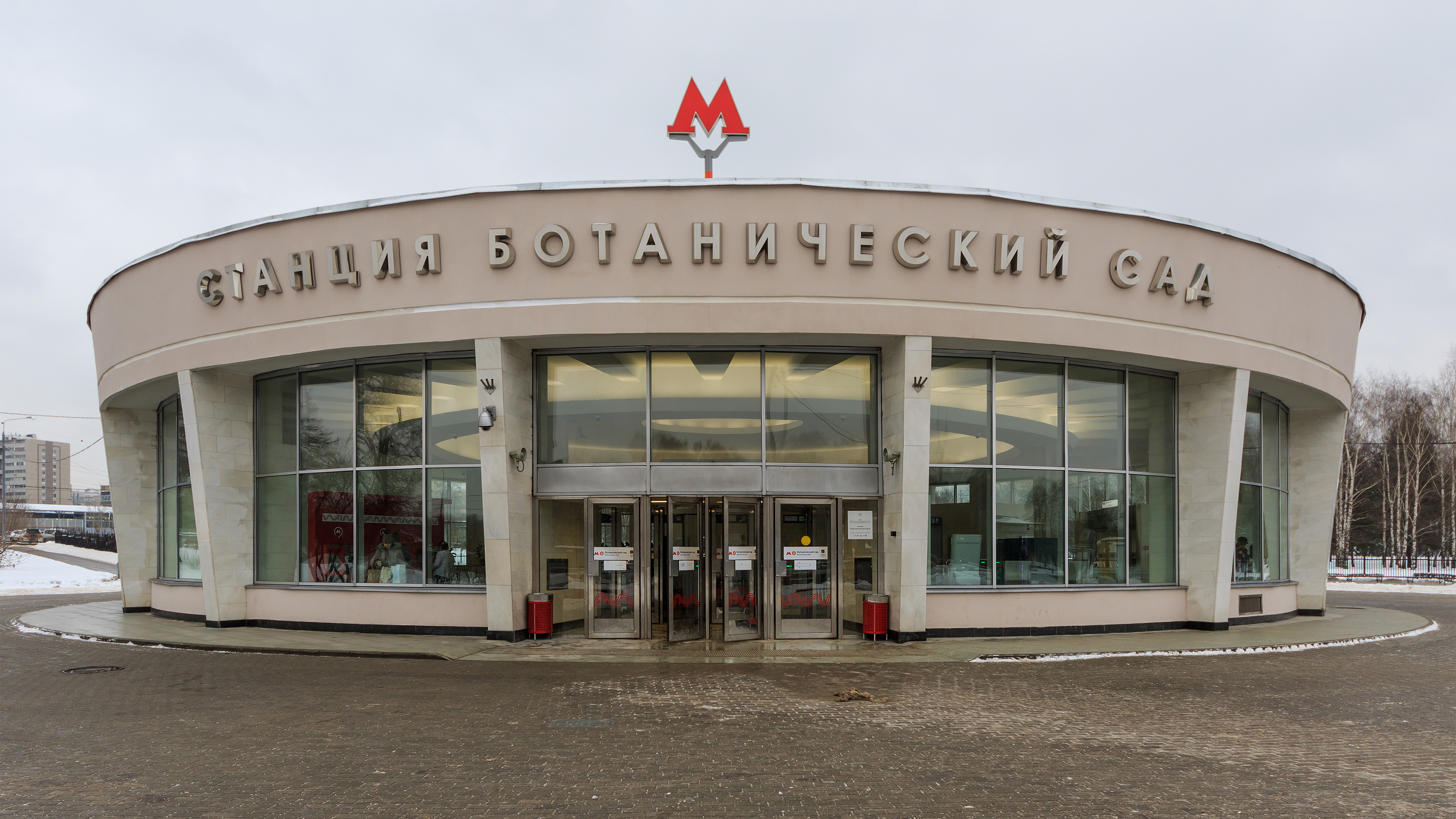
Southern entrance rotunda

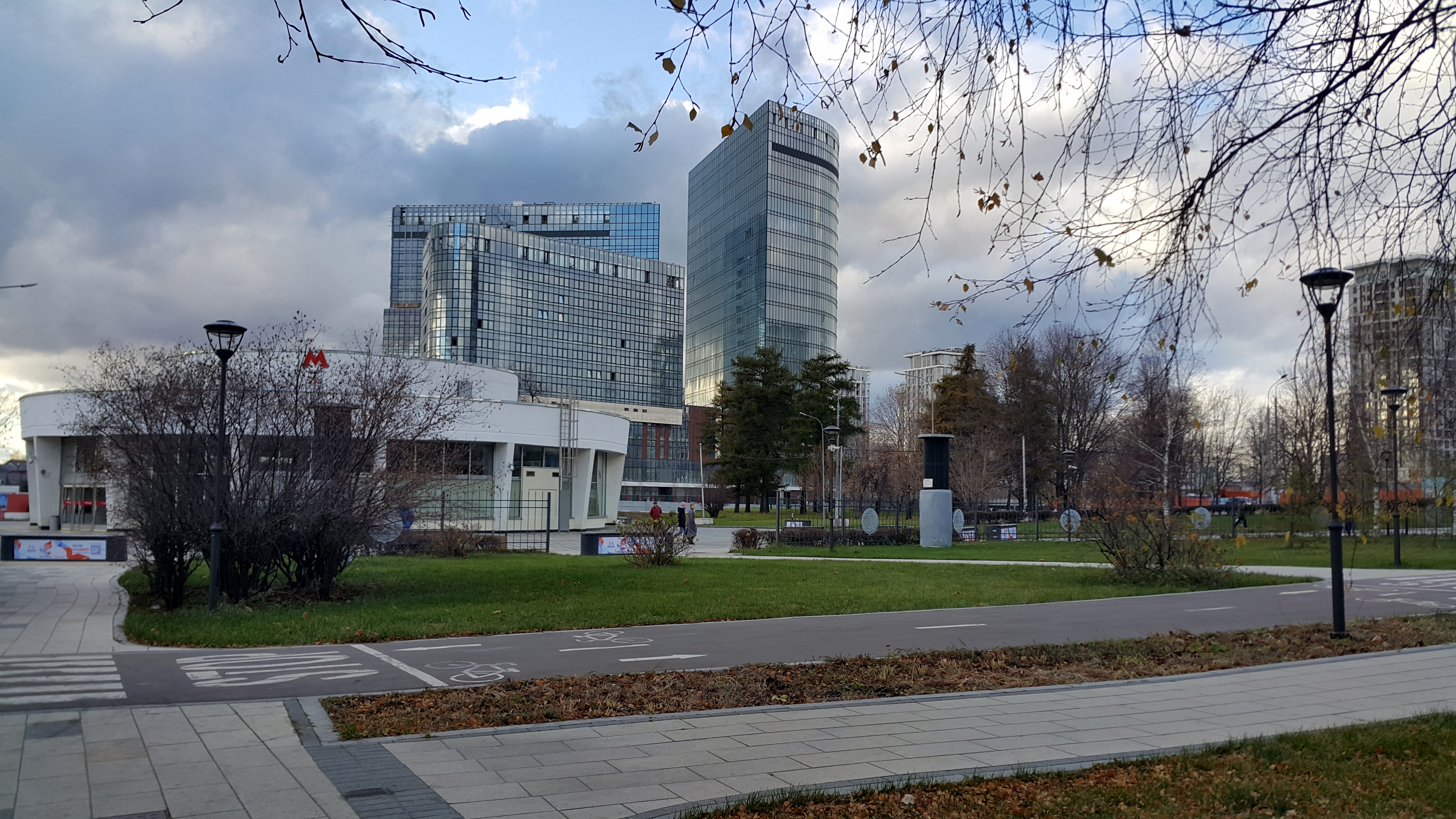

Botanichesky Sad was designed by architects N. Demchinsky and Yuliya Kolesnikova. The station features a pillar-trispan with a ceiling covered with a grid of modular anodized aluminium light fixtures. White marble was used in facing the pillars and the walls, but the walls are also decorated with aluminium artworks on various nature-based themes (artist Z. Vetrova).

The station has two entrances; the southern entrance is a surface rotunda building on Leonova Street which is internally lit by sculptural lamps (work of N. Masterpulo) and is linked by escalators to the main platform. As the station is located under Moscow's circular railway, the station was foreseen as a possible future transfer point. The northern subterranean entrance is on the opposite side of the Moscow Little Ring Railway and is linked with subways under the Serebryakova and Snezhnaya Streets. The station is connected with the entrance by a vaulted subway under the railway. Partly because of its relatively empty surrounding area, the Botanichesky Sad station has low daily passenger traffic of 28,650.
