= Botanichesky Sad (Moscow Central Circle) =

Station on the Moscow Central Circle

Botanichesky Sad Ботанический сад
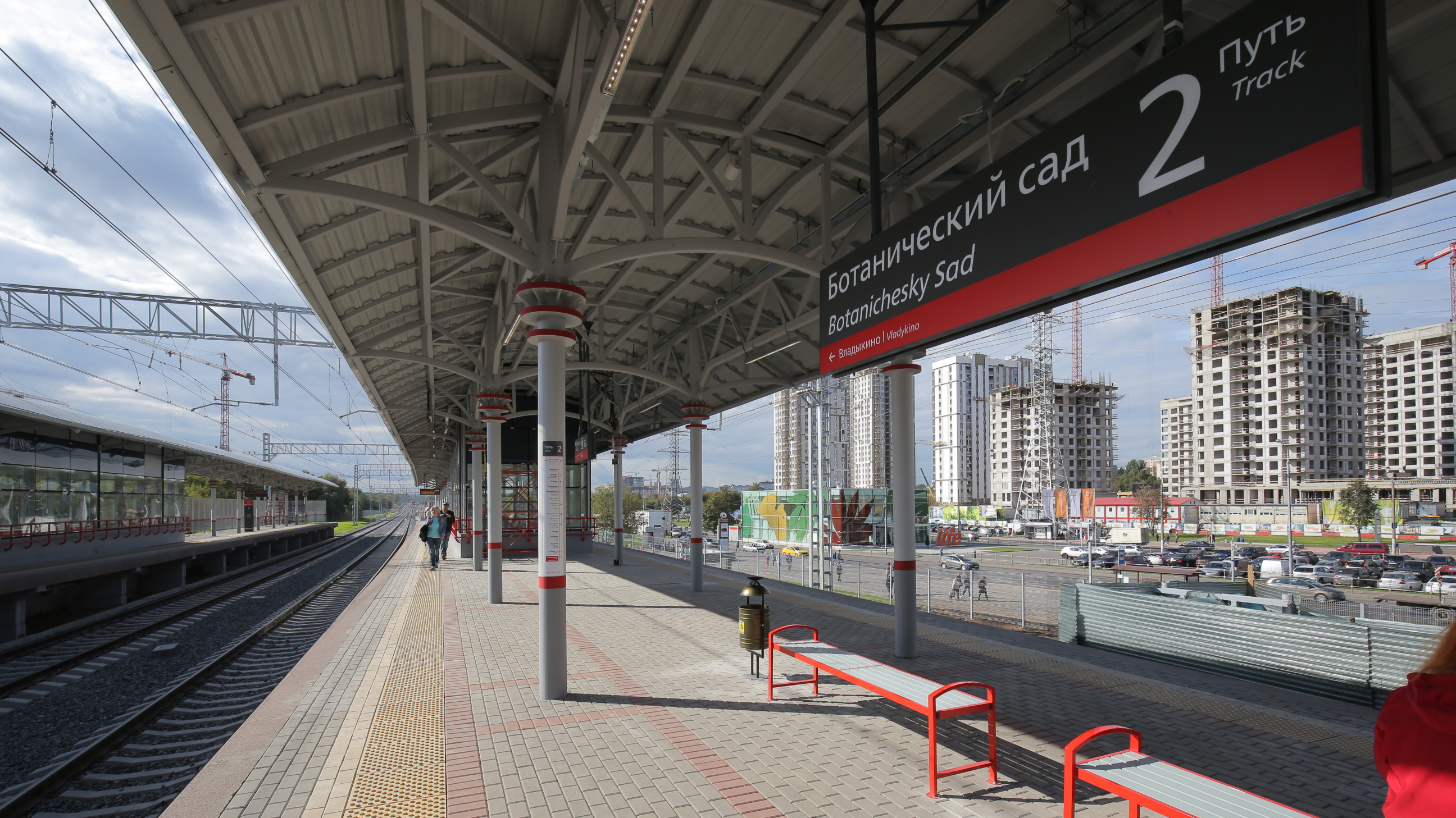

General information
- Coordinates: 55.8456°N 37.6383°E
- System: Moscow Metro
- Owner: Government of Moscow (MKZD)
- Operator: Russian Railways (within Moscow Metro)
- Line: Moscow Central Circle
- Platforms: 2 (side platforms)
- Tracks: 2
- Train operators: Russian Railways

Construction
- Structure type: At-grade
- Parking: Yes
- Cycle facilities: Yes
- Accessible: Yes

History
- Opened: 10 September 2016; 9 years ago

Services
Preceding station	Moscow Metro	Following station
Vladykino anticlockwise / outer	Moscow Central Circle	Rostokino clockwise / inner
Out-of-station interchange
Preceding station	Moscow Metro	Following station
VDNKh towards Novoyasenevskaya	Kaluzhsko-Rizhskaya line transfer at Botanichesky Sad	Sviblovo towards Medvedkovo
Location
- Location within Moscow Metro

Botanichesky Sad (Russian: Ботанический сад) is a station on the Moscow Central Circle of the Moscow Metro. Construction started on the station in October 2014 and the station opened in September 2016.

== Name ==
The station is named for the nearby Moscow Botanical Garden.

== Transfer ==
The station offers free out-of-station transfers to Botanichesky Sad station of the Kaluzhsko-Rizhskaya Line. In 2018, the city plans to complete an underground facility that connects the stations.

== Gallery ==
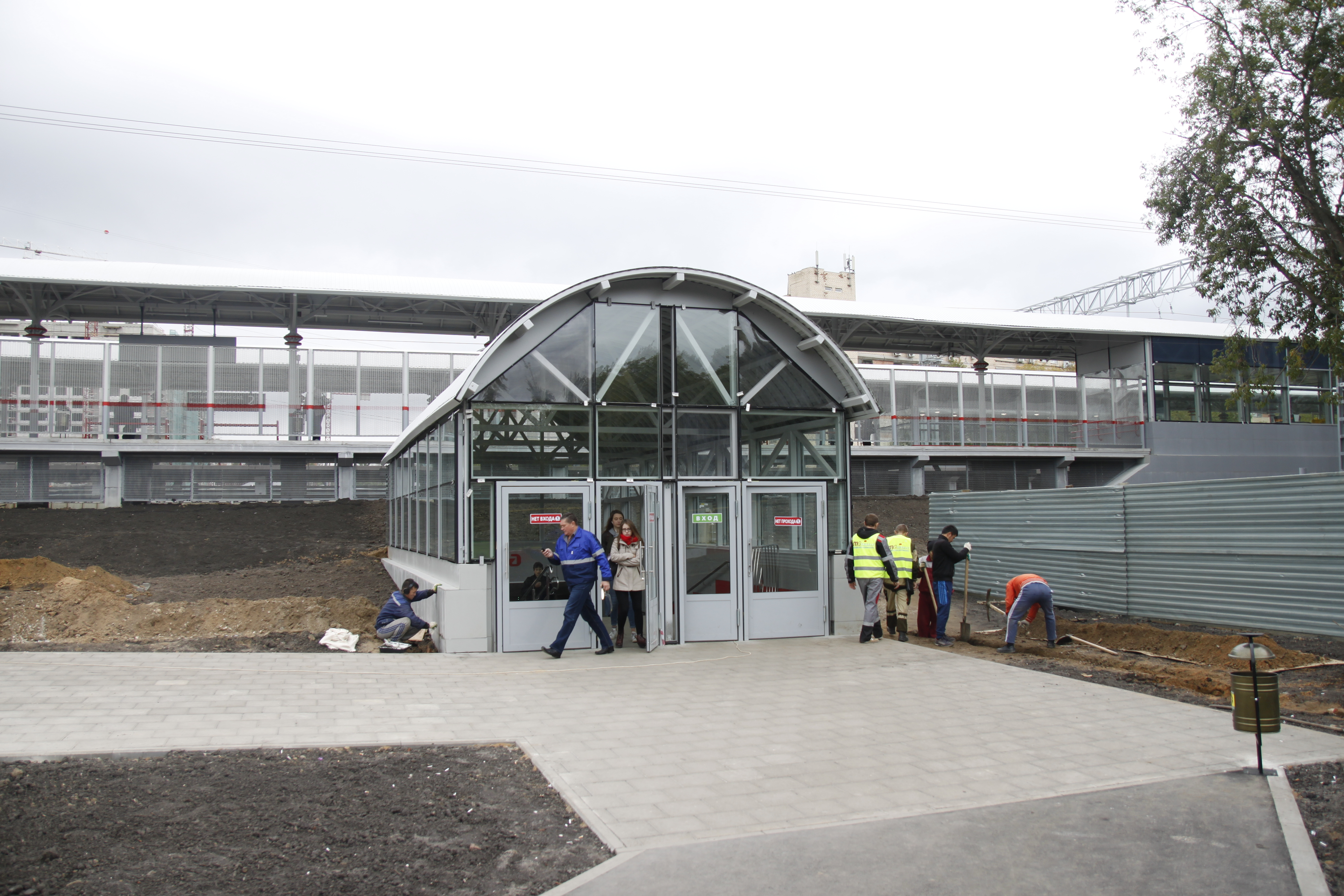

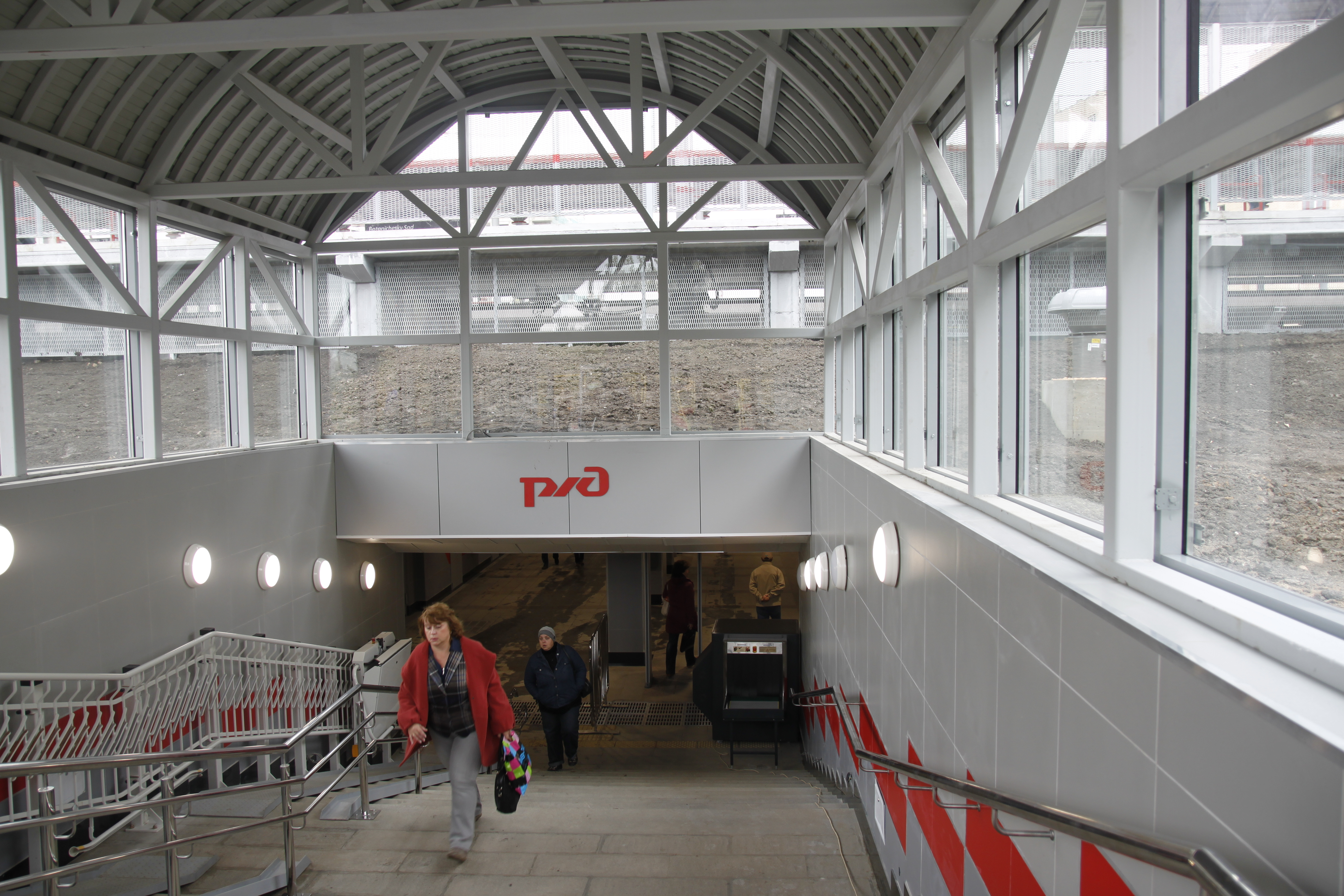

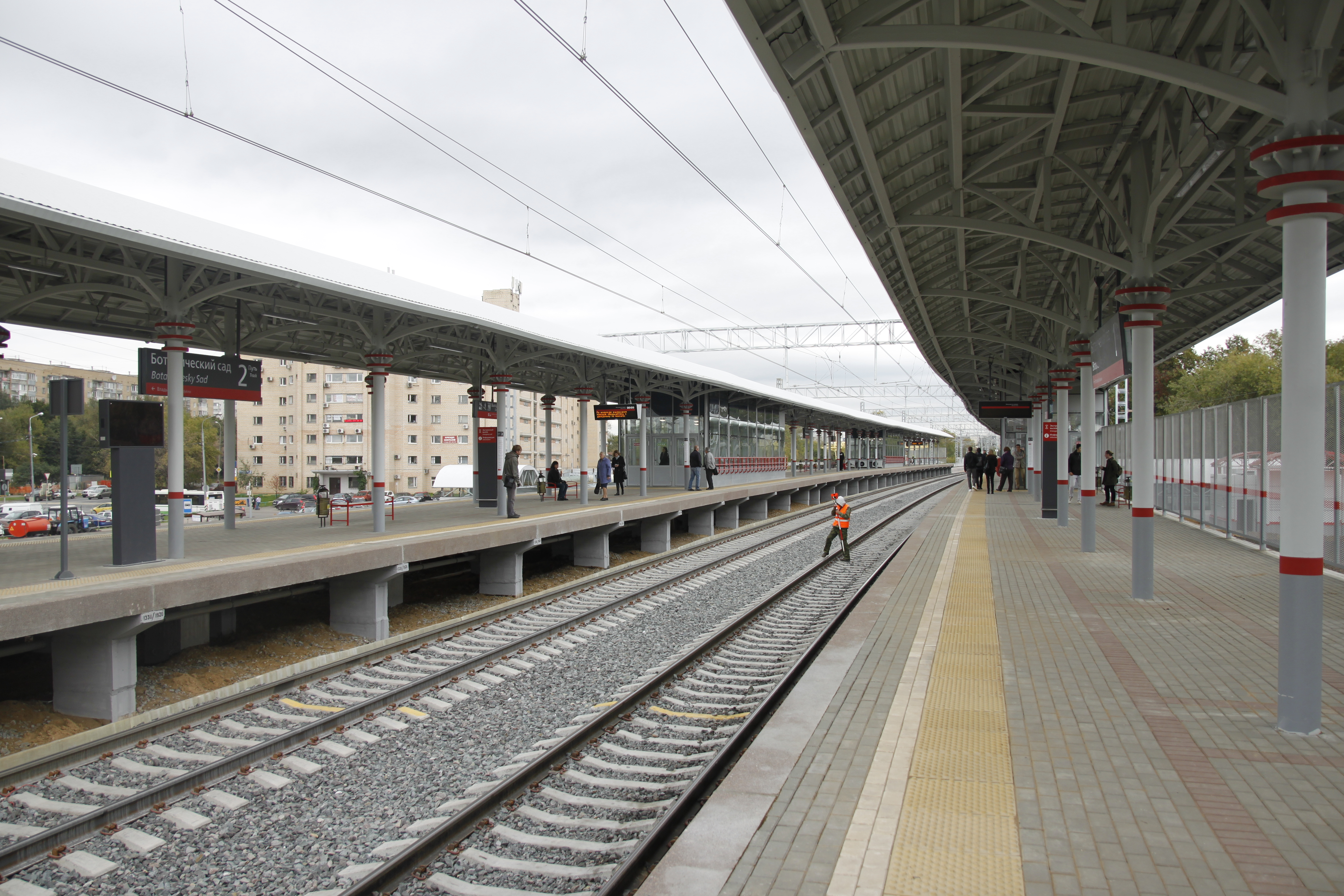

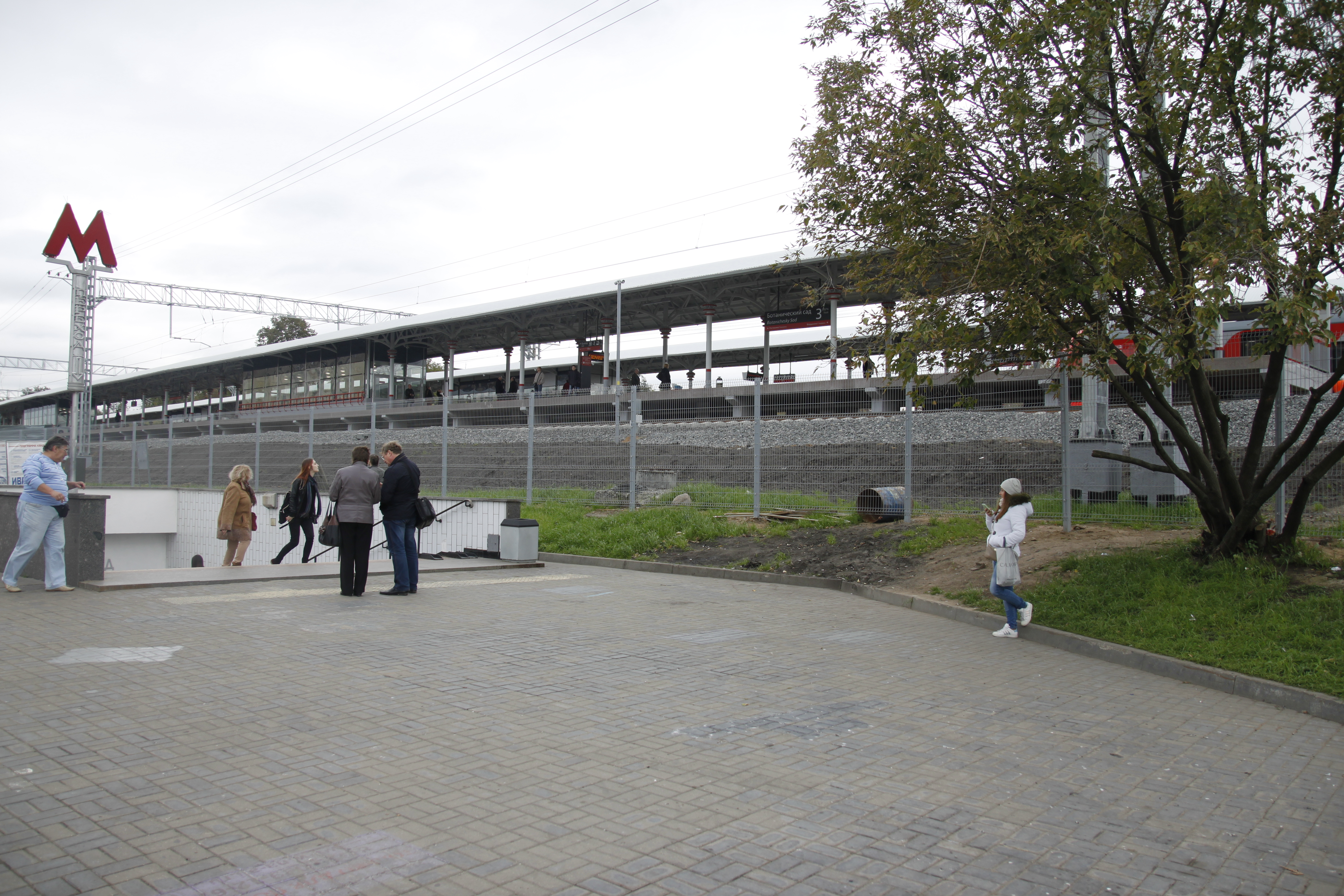
