= Rostokino (Little Ring of the Moscow Railway) =

Railway station in Moscow

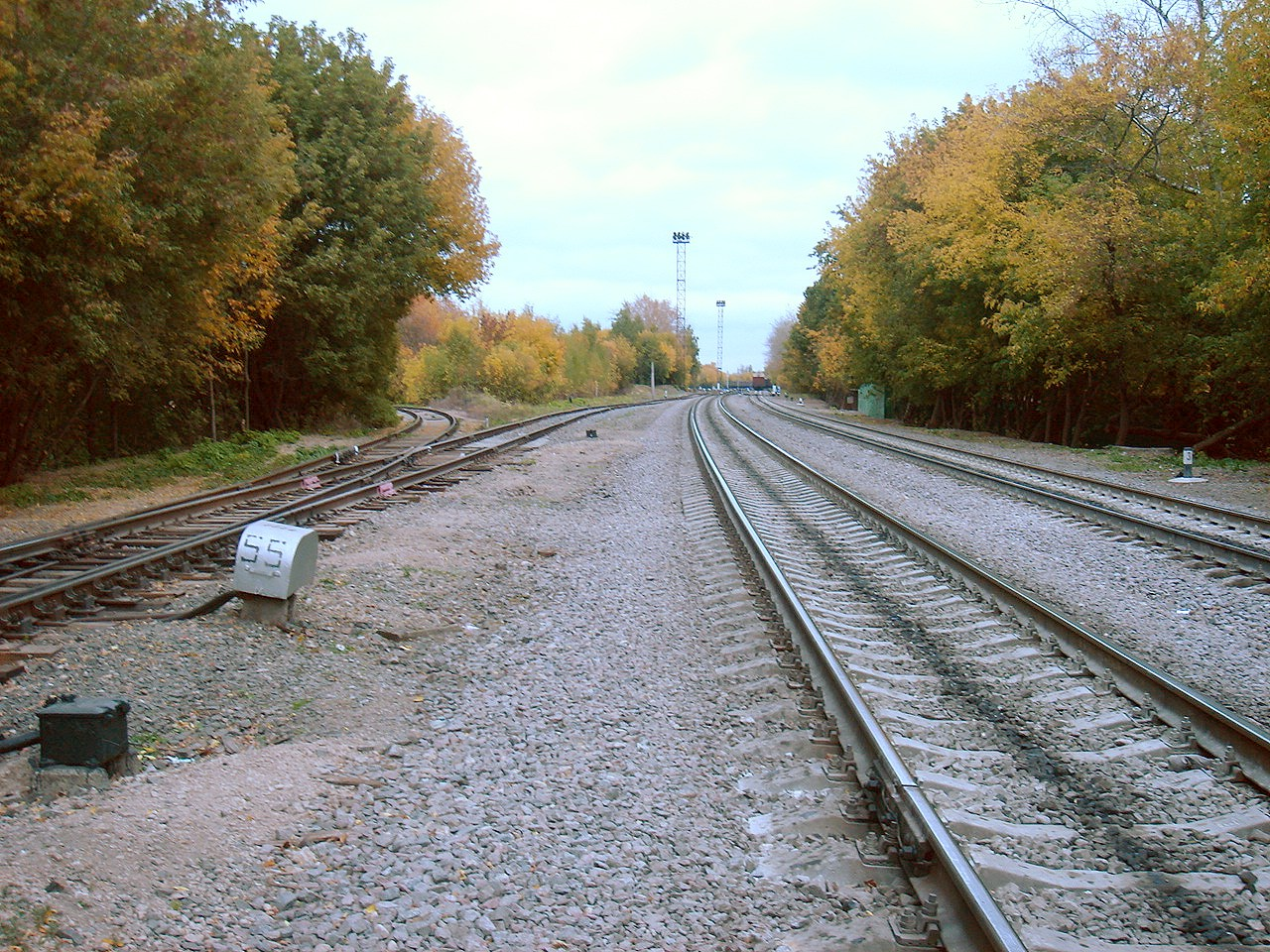

General information
- Location: Rostokino District, Moscow, Russia
- Coordinates: 55°50′37″N 37°39′19″E
- Owner: Russian Railways
- Line: Little Ring of the Moscow Railway
- Tracks: 3

Construction
- Depth: 0 m (0 ft)

Other information
- Station code: 199002

History
- Opened: 1908

Passengers
- 2010: 0 0%
Location

Rostokino (Russian: Ростокино) was a railway station of the Little Ring of the Moscow Railway. It is named after the Rostokino district where it is located. It was opened in 1908. It was used by freight trains only although there was also passenger traffic in the middle of 20th century. In September 2016, the station of the Moscow Central Circle was opened.

The station buildings were constructed in 1905—1906 by architect Alexander Pomerantsev. They have a protected status. Pomerantsev was responsible for most of the station buildings of the Little Ring of the Moscow Railway, and he essentially developed three different projects. In particular, the design of the Rostokino station buildings was earlier used for Ugreshskaya and is also similar to Lefortovo stations.

== See also ==
- Russian Railways
