= Losiny Ostrov National Park =

Urban national park in Moscow City and Oblast, Russia

- IUCN category II (national park)
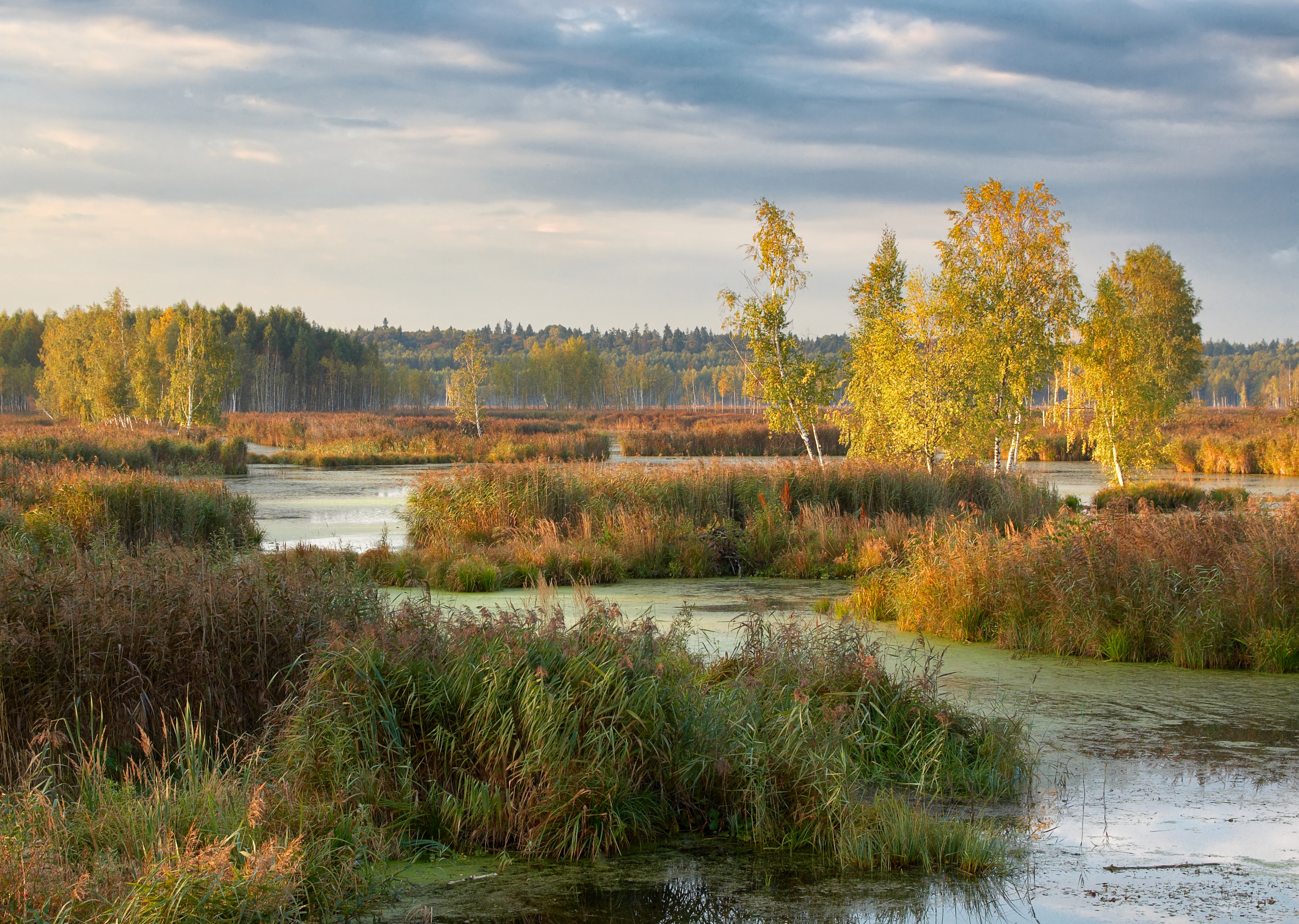
- Upper Yauza Swamps, the city of Balashikha

- Location within Russia
- Location: Russia
- Nearest city: Moscow
- Coordinates: 55°51′49″N 37°46′39″E
- Area: 116 km^{2} (45 sq mi)
- Established: 24 August 1983
- Website: https://losinyiostrov.ru/

Losiny Ostrov National Park (Russian: Национальный парк "Лосиный Остров", literally - Elk (Moose) Island ) is the second oldest national park of Russia (after Sochi National Park). It is located in Moscow and Moscow Oblast. It is the largest urban park in Europe.

Losiny Ostrov is one of a few locations in Moscow where one can see wild animals in their natural environment, including the moose. In total there are 44 species of mammals and 170 bird species, 9 amphibian species, 5 reptile species and 19 fish species.

== Geography ==
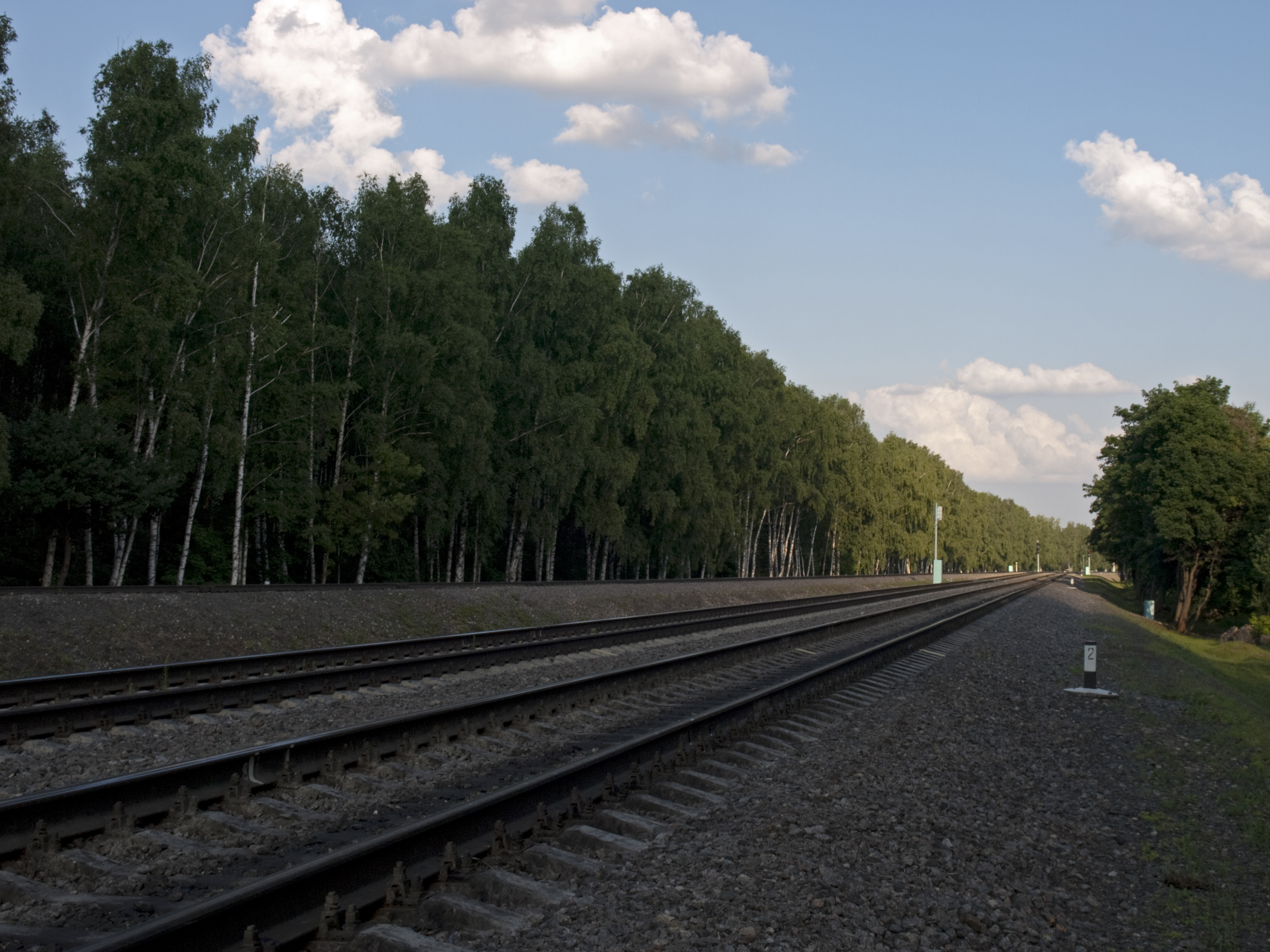
Moscow Little Ring Railway in 2011: Belokamennaya Station is ahead

The total area of the national park in 2001 was 116.21 km², (28,717 acres). Forest occupied 96.04 km² (83% of area) of the total, of which 30.77 km² (27%) fall within the boundaries of Moscow city. Other land types in the park include 1.69 km² (2%) of water and 5.74 km², or 5% of swamp. An additional 66.45 km² is reserved for expansion of the park.

The park is divided into the three functional zones:

- Especially protected, 53.94 km² (47%), closed to the public;
- For training and excursion, 31.30 km² (27%) is open for restricted visits along established routes;
- Recreational, 29.81 km² (26%), is open for mass entry.

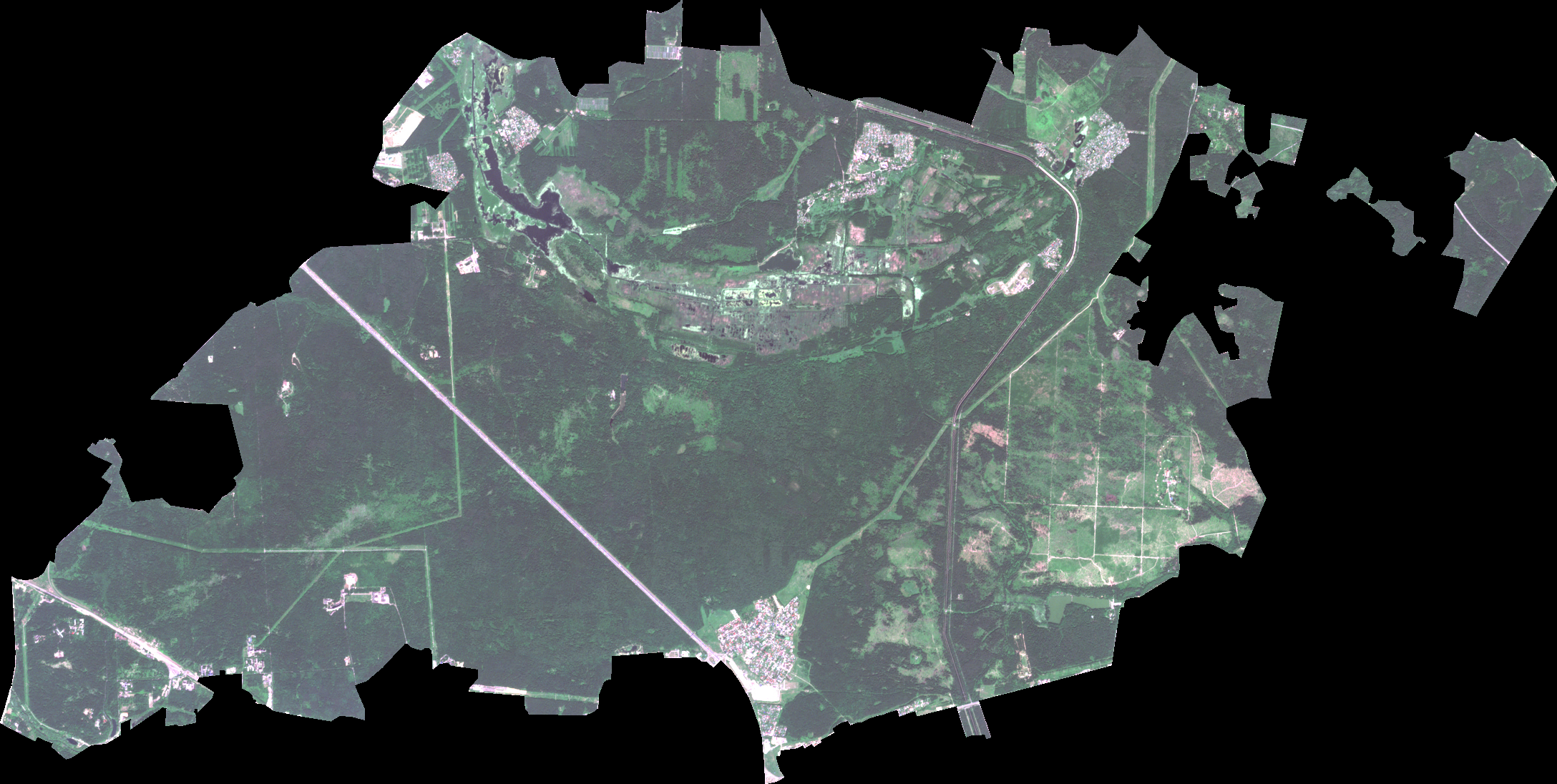
Sentinel-2 satellite imagery cropped by park boundary (2019)

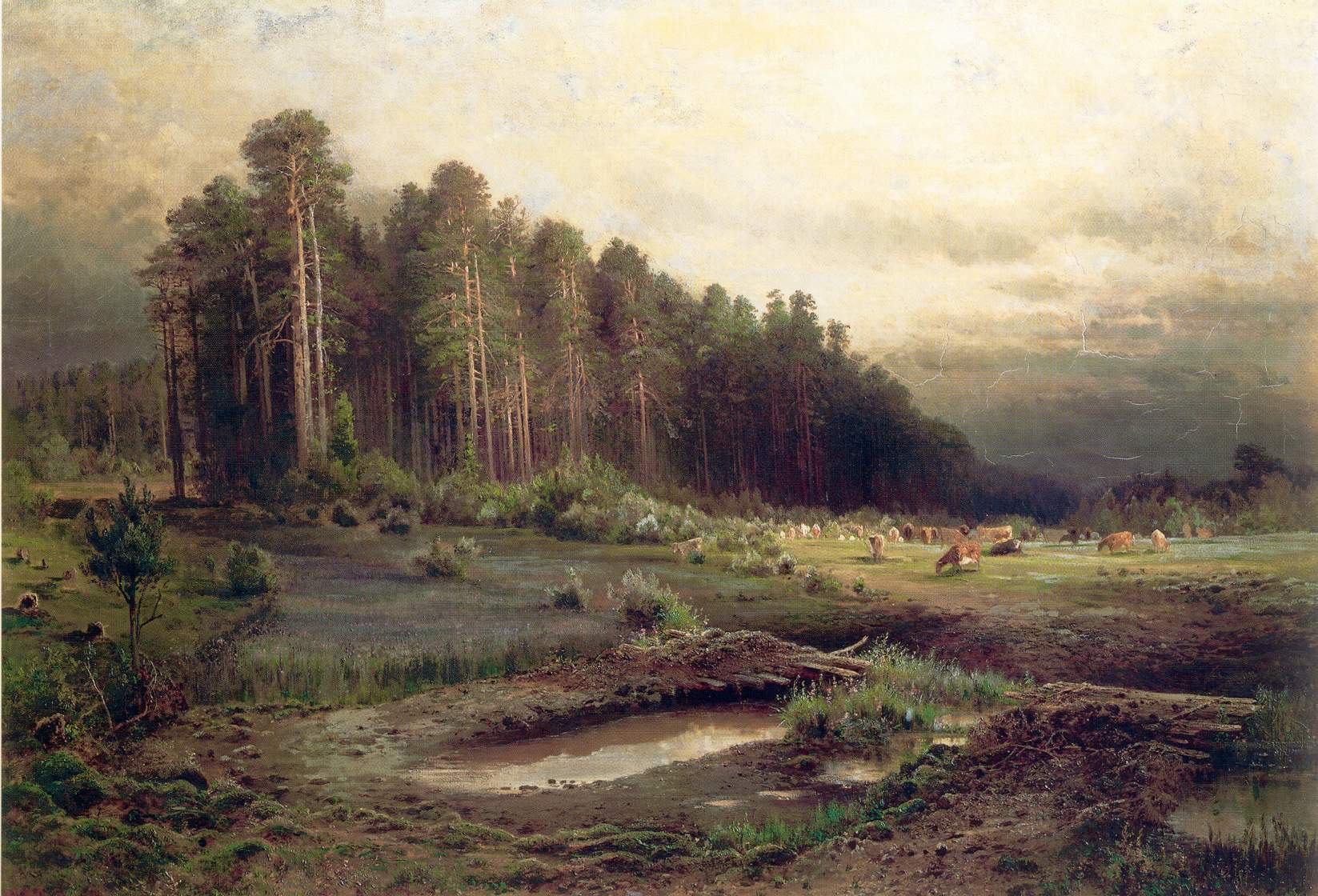
Losiny Ostrov in Sokolniki by Alexei Savrasov (1869)

Geographically, the park occupies the joint of the Meshchera Lowlands and Klin-Dmitrov chine, which is the watershed of the Moskva River and Klyazma River. The relief of the territory is a slightly undulating plain. The true altitudes of the locality vary from 146 m (floodlands of the Yauza River) to 175 m above sea level. In the center part of the park relief is expressed weakly. The most picturesque locality is on the southwest of the park, where the above-floodplain terraces of the Yauza River are clearly expressed with the sufficiently steep slopes to its floodlands.

The sources of the Yauza and the Pekhorka can be found on the territory of the park. The natural riverbed of the Yauza was practically destroyed in the course of peateries in the 1950s-1970s. The riverbed of the Pekhorka is vastly changed after the Akulovo hydro-electric station was built. The Yauza has several inflows here, the largest of which is the Ichka.

In Moscow, the national park area is crossed by the Moscow Little Ring Railway. The Belokamennaya Station is located inside the park. The portions of the park which belong to Moscow and to Moscow Oblast are separated by the Moscow Ring Road, which is a multi-lane dual carriageway.

== History ==
Losiny Ostrov National Park was created in 1983 on the land which since ancient times served as the strictly guarded hunting area of Russian Grand Princes and tsars. Its territory was declared reserved in 1799, the first forest management was established here in 1842, and the idea of the creation of the national park was expressed as early as 1909.

This place is known from the 14th century, in particular, from the testaments of Russian princes - Ivan Kalita, Dmitri Donskoi, Vladimir of Serpukhov and their descendants. In them plowed lands and the forests, located on the territory of the present national park, are mentioned. Later, this region became the place for hunting by the tsars, and the land of the future park came under protection. During the Time of Troubles, the economic activity here was abruptly reduced, former plowed land was overgrown with forest. The prosperity of the Losiny Ostrov as a hunting area was due to Tsar Alexis.

After the transfer of the capital to Saint Petersburg, this territory lost its value as a tsarist hunting ground, but the government property continued to be guarded by imperial edicts. Approximately at this time the territory finally became named Losiny Ostrov or Pogonny Losiny Ostrov. In 1798, these forests passed to the management of the newly formed forest department. In the middle of the 19th century the Losinoostrovskaya lesnaya dacha was opened, and the period of systematic forestry began. In 1934, the Losiny Ostrov was included in the 50 kilometers long greenbelt of Moscow.

A large area of the forest was cut during World War II. From this time on, the future national park has suffered from arbitrary seizures of land for vegetable gardens, intense pasturing of cattle, and even illegal cuttings. In the late 1950s, construction of Moscow Ring Road split the forest to inner and outer (larger) sectors. In 1979, the united resolution of the Moscow urban and provincial Soviets of People’s Deputies organized the Losiny Ostrov as a natural park. In 1983 the decision of the Council of Ministers of the RSFSR formed the national park.

Since 2002, the Elk Biological Station has been in operation. It opened in December 2015 after reconstruction. There you can touch and feed the elk and learn all about its life

On 20 April 2007, the murder of Shamil Odamanov took place in the park.

In 2025, authorities in Korolyov approved the construction of a highway inside the park.

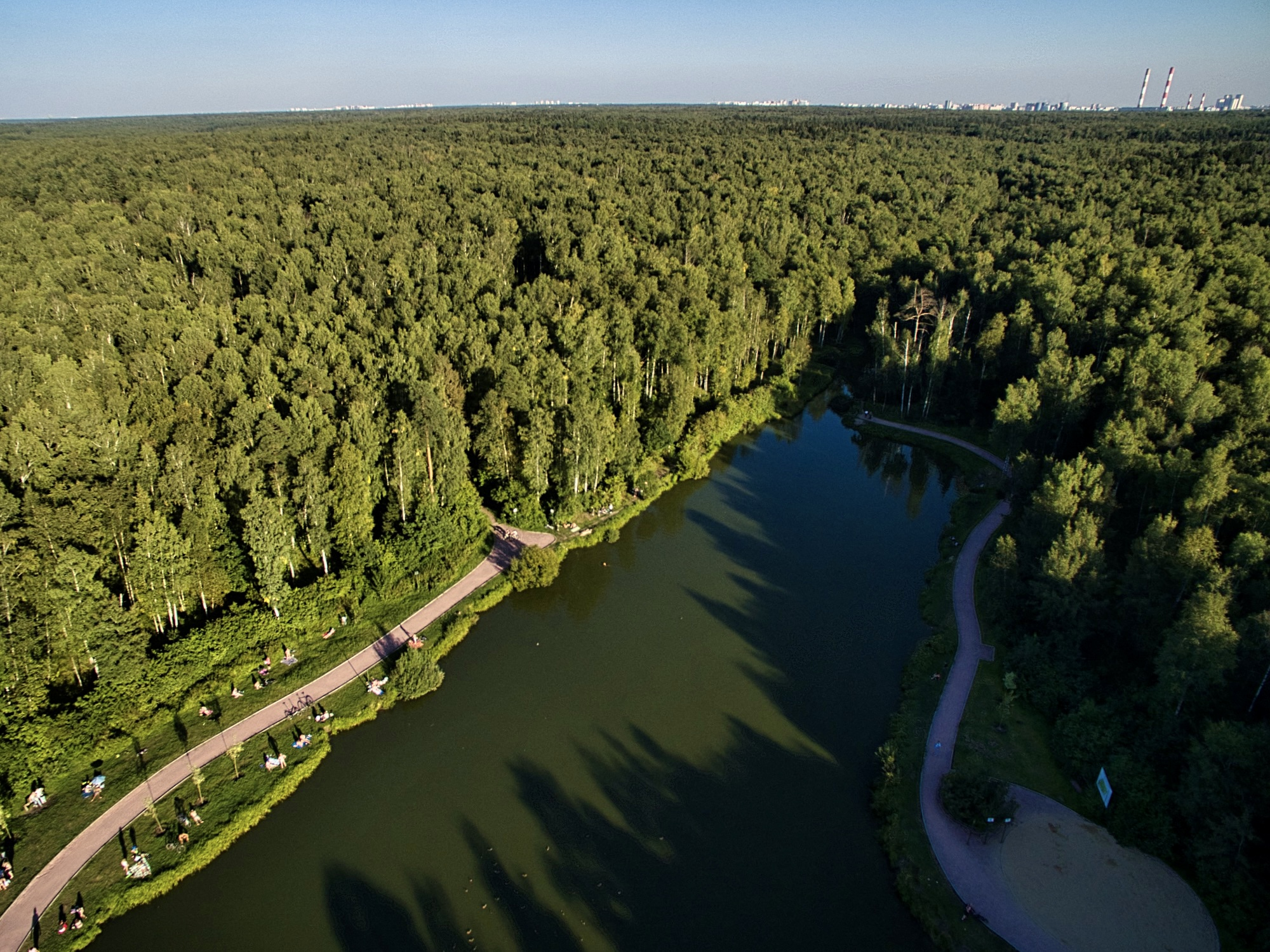
A pond on the Elk River

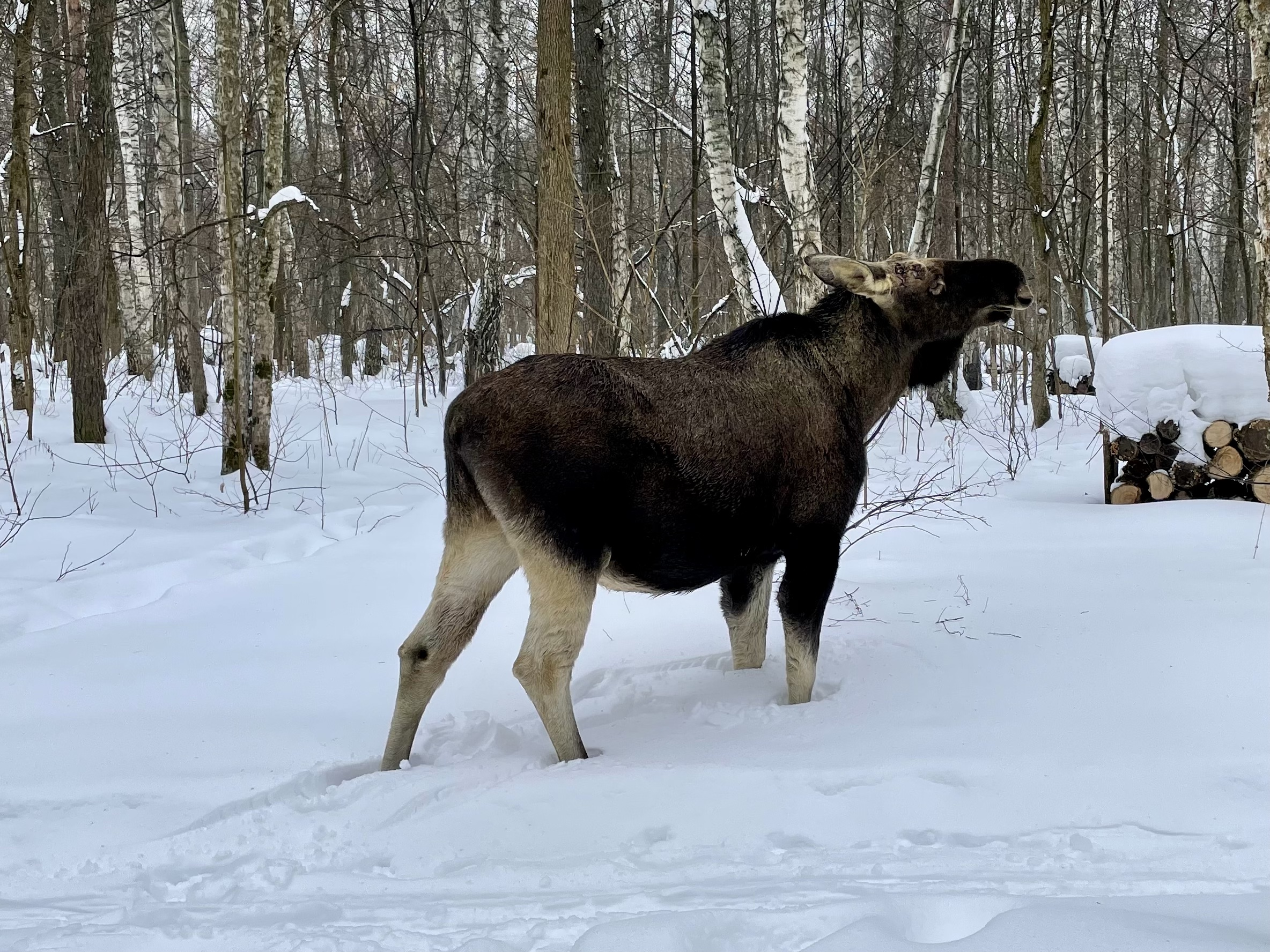
Elk in an urban park

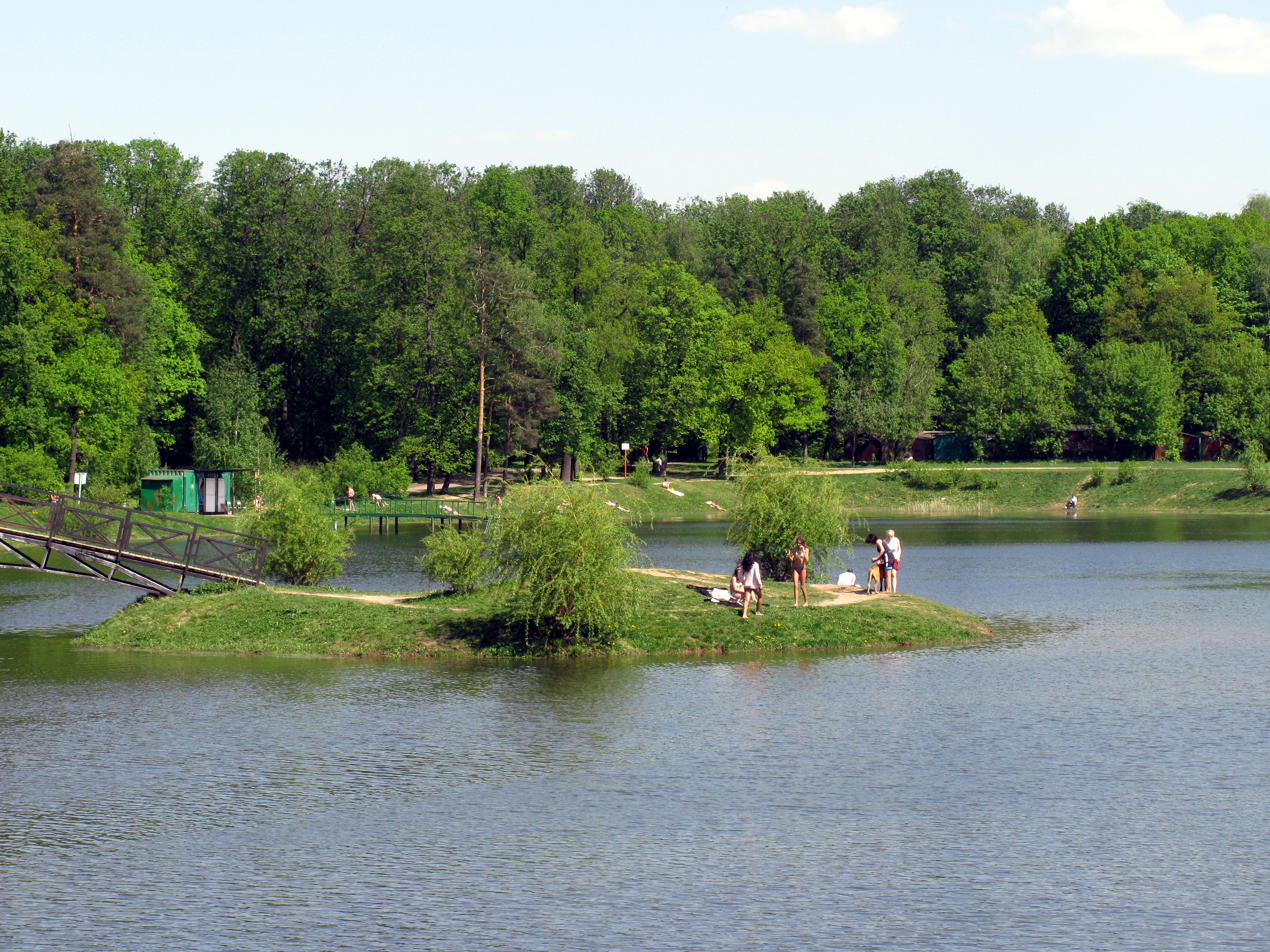
Babaevsky pond

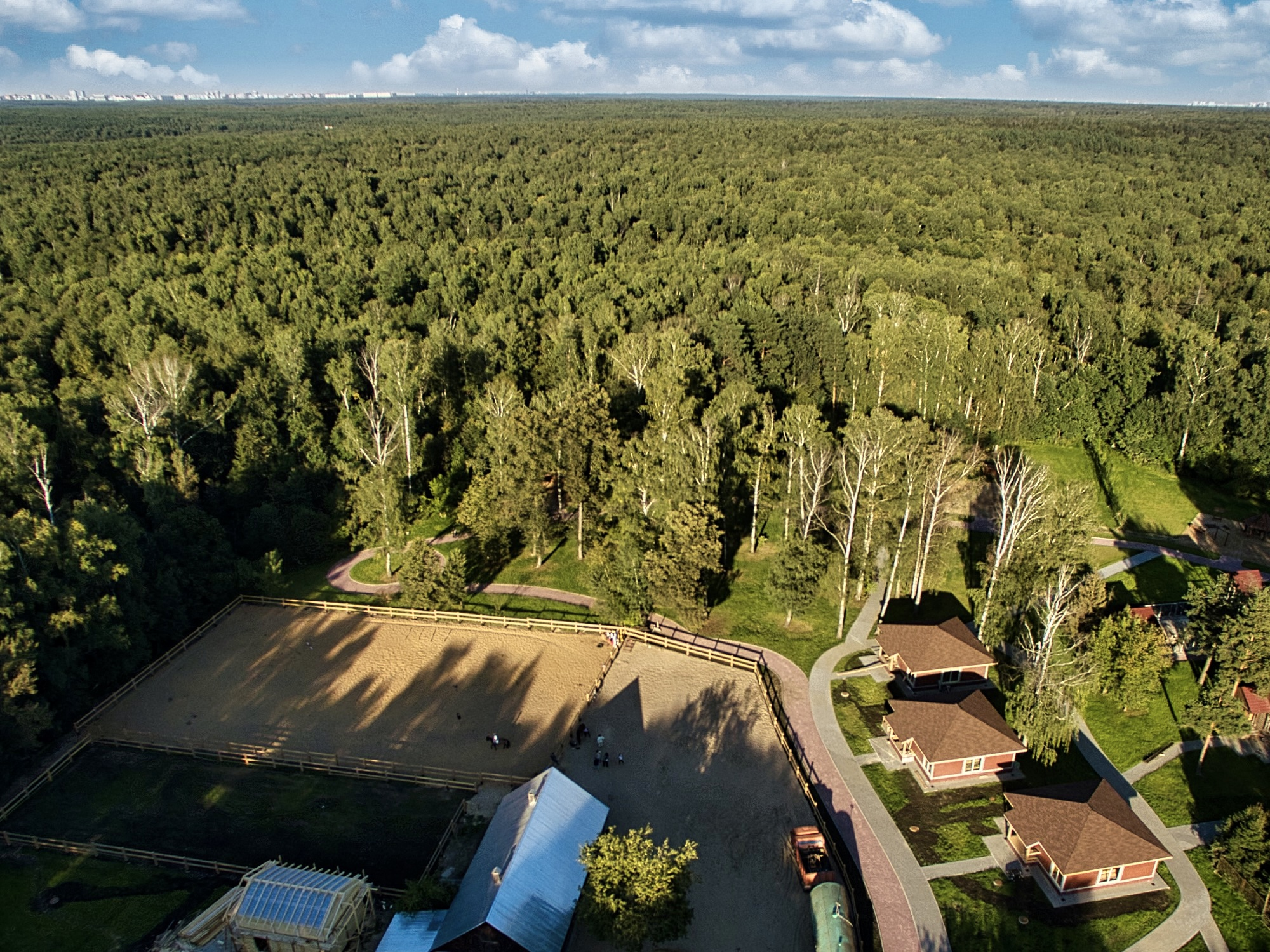
Losinka Horse Club

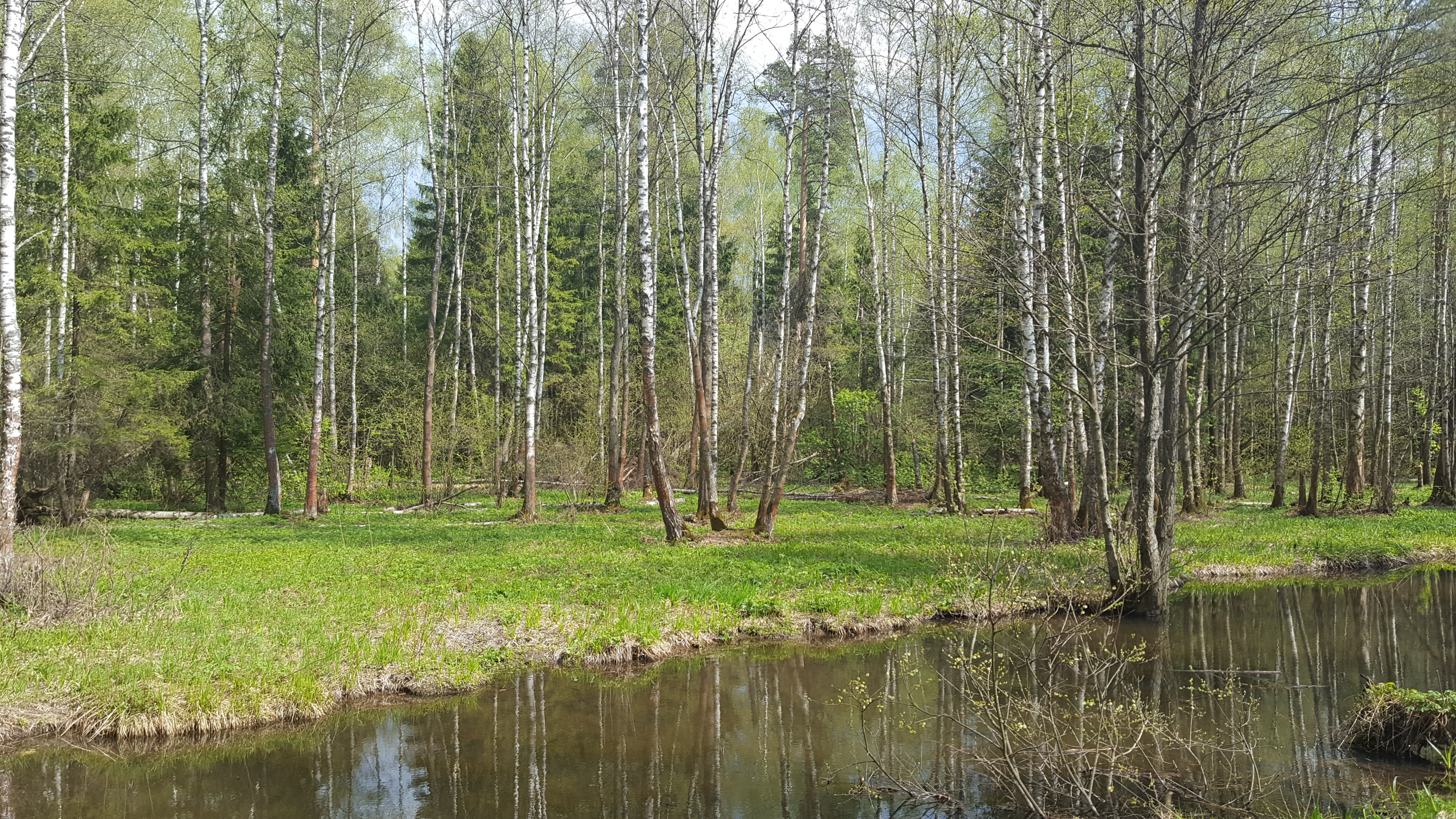
Ichka River in Losiny Ostrov
