= Bogorodskoye District =

- District
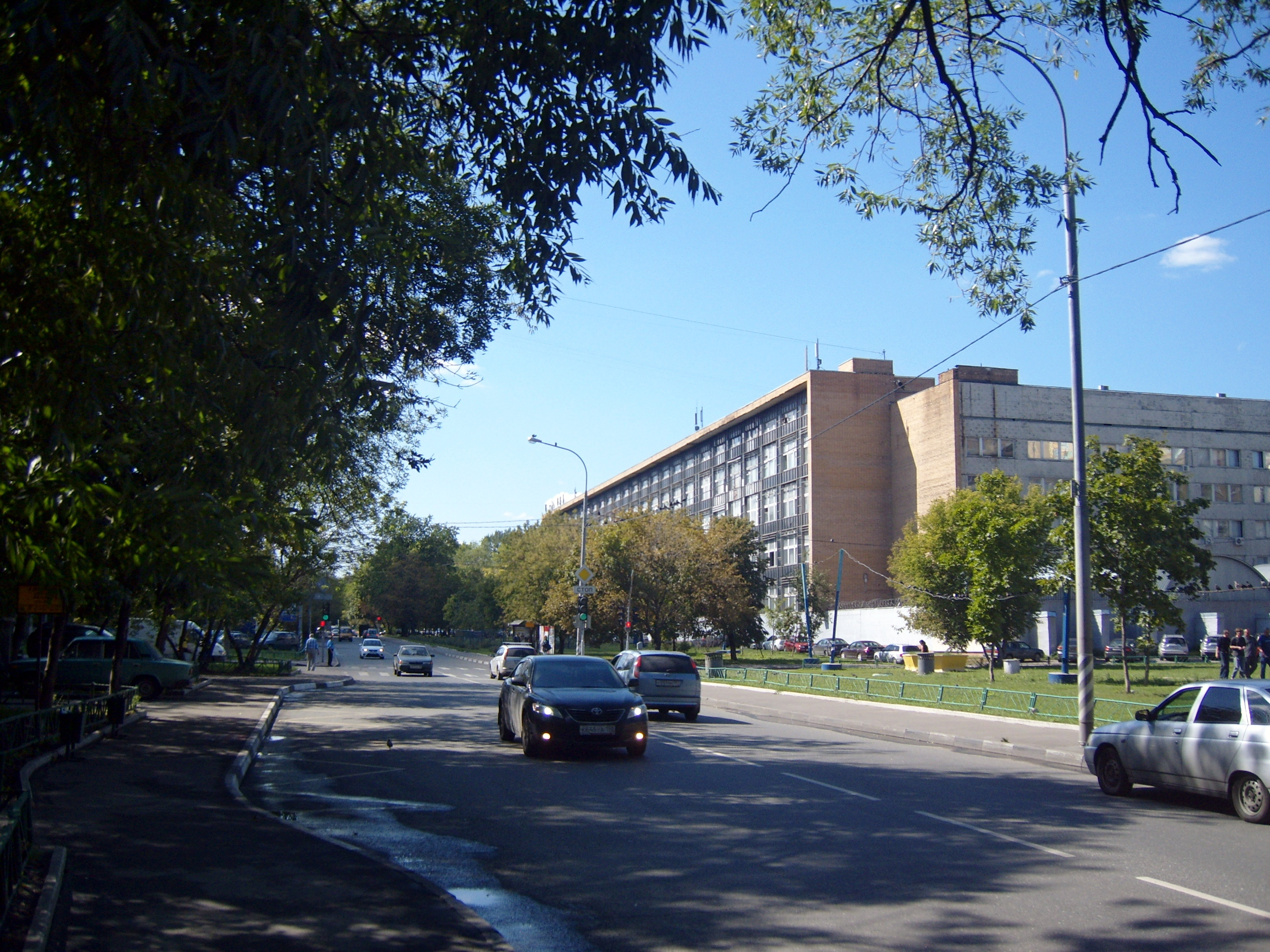
- Prostornaya street, Bogorodskoye District

- Flag Coat of arms
- Location of Bogorodskoye District on the map of Moscow
- Coordinates: 55°48′12″N 37°42′17″E
- Country: Russia
- Federal subject: Moscow

Area
  - Total: 10.24 km^{2} (3.95 sq mi)
- Time zone: UTC+
- OKTMO ID: 45301000
- Website: http://bogorodskoe.mos.ru/

Bogorodskoye District (Russian: Богородское райо́н) is an administrative district (raion) of Eastern Administrative Okrug, and one of the 125 raions of Moscow, Russia. The area of the district is 10.24 square kilometers (3.95 sq mi).

== Borders and territory ==
The boundary of the Bogorodskoye District runs along the axis of Bogorodsky Val Street, then follows the axis of the Yauza River (including the territory of the "Krasny Bogatyr" Industrial Association), the southeastern borders of the Losiny Ostrov National Park, the axis of the Small Ring of the Moscow Railway, the axes of Tyumenskaya Street, Otkrytoye Highway, Prostornaya Street, and Alymova Street, and Alymov Lane up to Bogorodsky Val Street.

The district's boundaries also include the properties at numbers 4 and 6 on Yauzskaya Alley, numbers 4 and 12/14 on Losinoostrovskaya Street, and numbers 8 and 17 at the "Belokamennaya" station of the Small Ring of the Moscow Railway.

== History ==
The first official records of a settlement located on the territory of present-day Bogorodskoye date back to the mid-16th century. In the 1550 Census Book, it is referred to as Alymovo, an estate of Prince Lykov-Obolensky. Today, the memory of this village is preserved in the names of Alymova Street and Alymov Lane. However, excavations conducted in the district on the banks of the Yauza River revealed a cultural layer containing red pottery, suggesting that a settlement existed here a century and a half to two centuries before its first mention in the Census Book.

For a brief period, Alymovo was owned by Ivan the Terrible, who in 1568 signed a charter granting these lands to the Chudov Monastery. By 1680, a wooden chapel dedicated to the Dormition of the Holy Virgin (which has not survived) was built at the church cemetery, and from that time onward, the settlement became firmly known as Bogoroditskoye or Bogorodskoye. During the reign of Peter the Great, the first paper production facility in Russia was established here. By the early 19th century, Bogorodskoye had become state property. From the mid-19th century, the construction of dachas (country houses) began in Bogorodskoye, which became highly popular among city residents. Notable figures such as I.I. Shishkin, P.I. Tchaikovsky, A.P. Borodin, and M.A. Balakirev lived in these dachas.

Between 1876 and 1880, a wooden Church of the Transfiguration was built in the village, which has survived to this day. In 1879, an agreement was reached between the city and the local government to include Bogorodskoye within the boundaries of Moscow. In 1886, a horse-drawn railway line was laid from Sokolniki to Bogorodskoye (the fare was 7 kopecks), and in 1912, the line was converted into a tramway. By the early 20th century, the area around the village of Bogorodskoye had transformed into a working-class settlement associated with the "Bogatyr" factory (later renamed "Krasny Bogatyr"), which produced rubber goods.

== See also ==
- Administrative divisions of Moscow
