= Belokamennaya (Moscow Central Circle) =

Station on the Moscow Central Circle

Belokamennaya Белокаменная
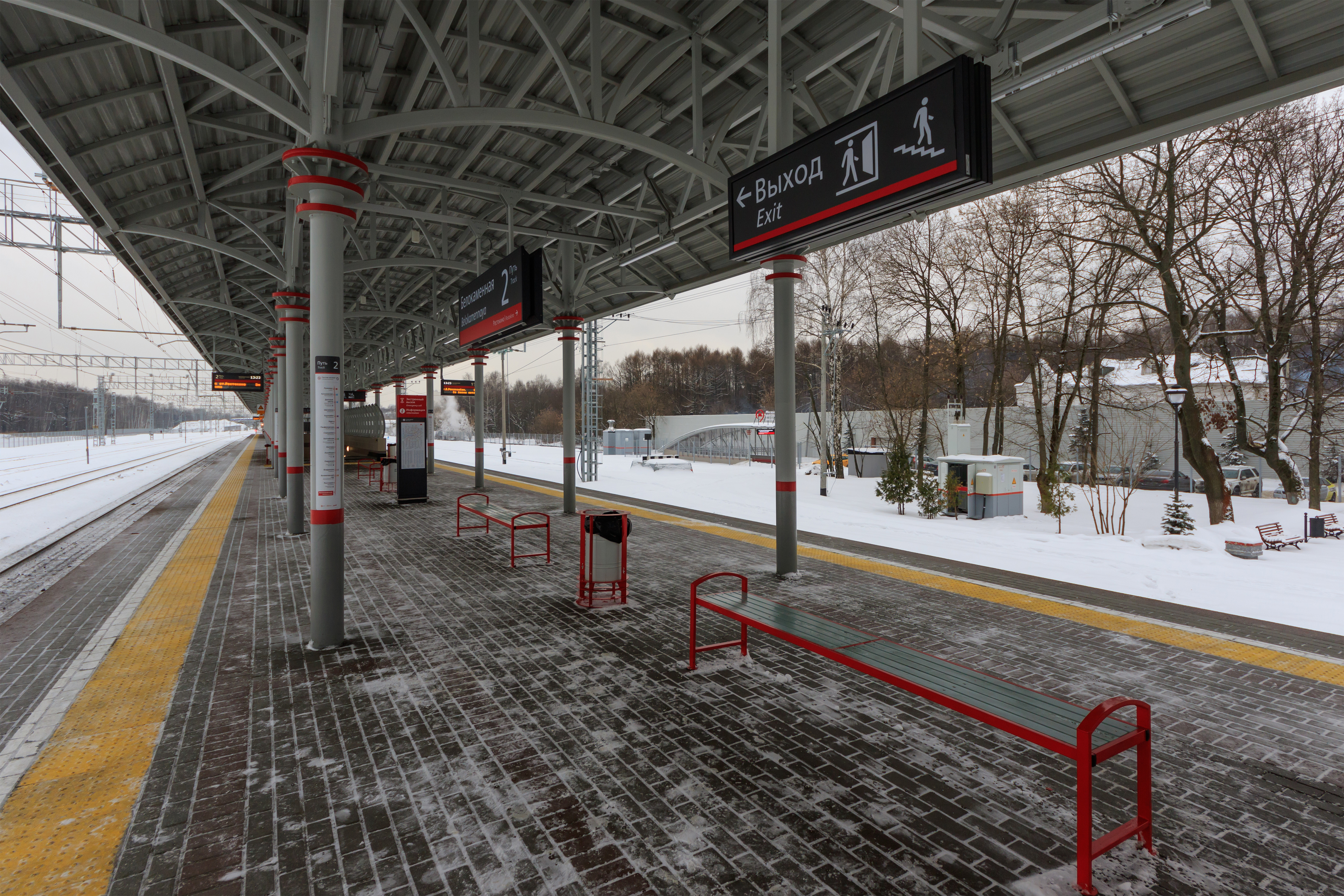

General information
- Coordinates: 55.8298°N 37.7018°E
- System: Moscow Metro
- Owner: Government of Moscow (MKZD)
- Operator: Russian Railways (within Moscow Metro)
- Line: Little Ring Railway
- Platforms: 1 island platform
- Tracks: 6
- Train operators: Russian Railways

Construction
- Structure type: At-grade
- Cycle facilities: Yes
- Accessible: Yes

History
- Opened: 10 September 2016; 9 years ago

Services
| Preceding station | Moscow Metro | Following station |
|---|---|---|
| Rostokino anticlockwise / outer | Moscow Central Circle | Bulvar Rokossovskogo clockwise / inner |
Location
- Location within Moscow Metro

Belokamennaya (Russian: Белокаменная, "White-stoned") is a station on the Moscow Central Circle, a circular urban rail line integrated with the Moscow Metro.

It was opened on 10 September 2016 together with the opening of the Moscow Central Circle. Belokamennaya located between the Rostokino and Bulvar Rokossovskogo platforms. It is located in the Eastern Administrative Okrug on the border of Bogorodskoye and Metrogorodok districts. It is the only railway platform in Moscow located directly on the territory of Losiny Ostrov National Park.

Belokamennaya is the last in popularity out of 31 stations of the Moscow Central Circle. In 2017, the average passenger traffic was approx. 1000 people per day and 38,000 per month; almost the entire traffic is made up of Losiny Ostrov visitors.

== Gallery ==
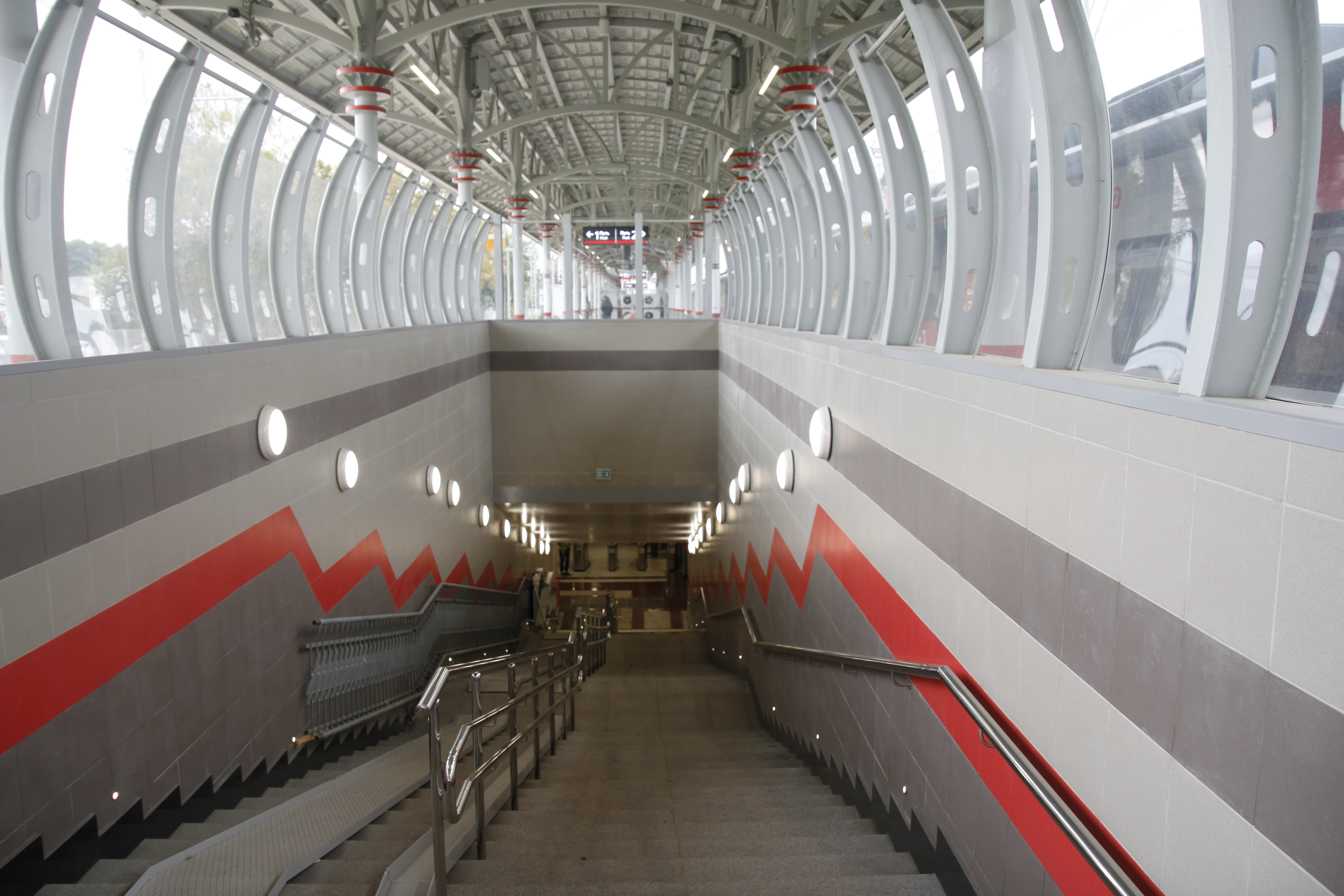

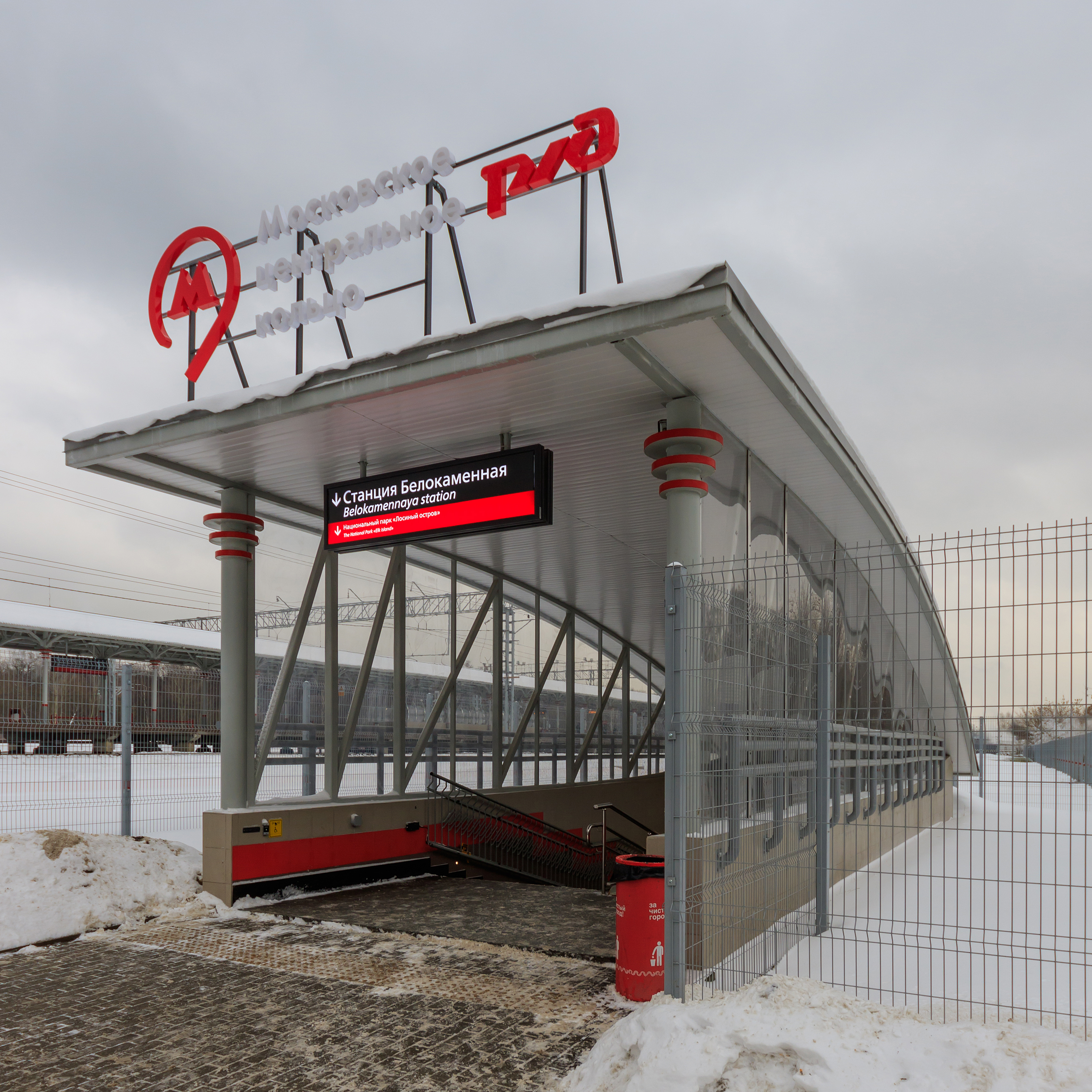
Underpass lobby

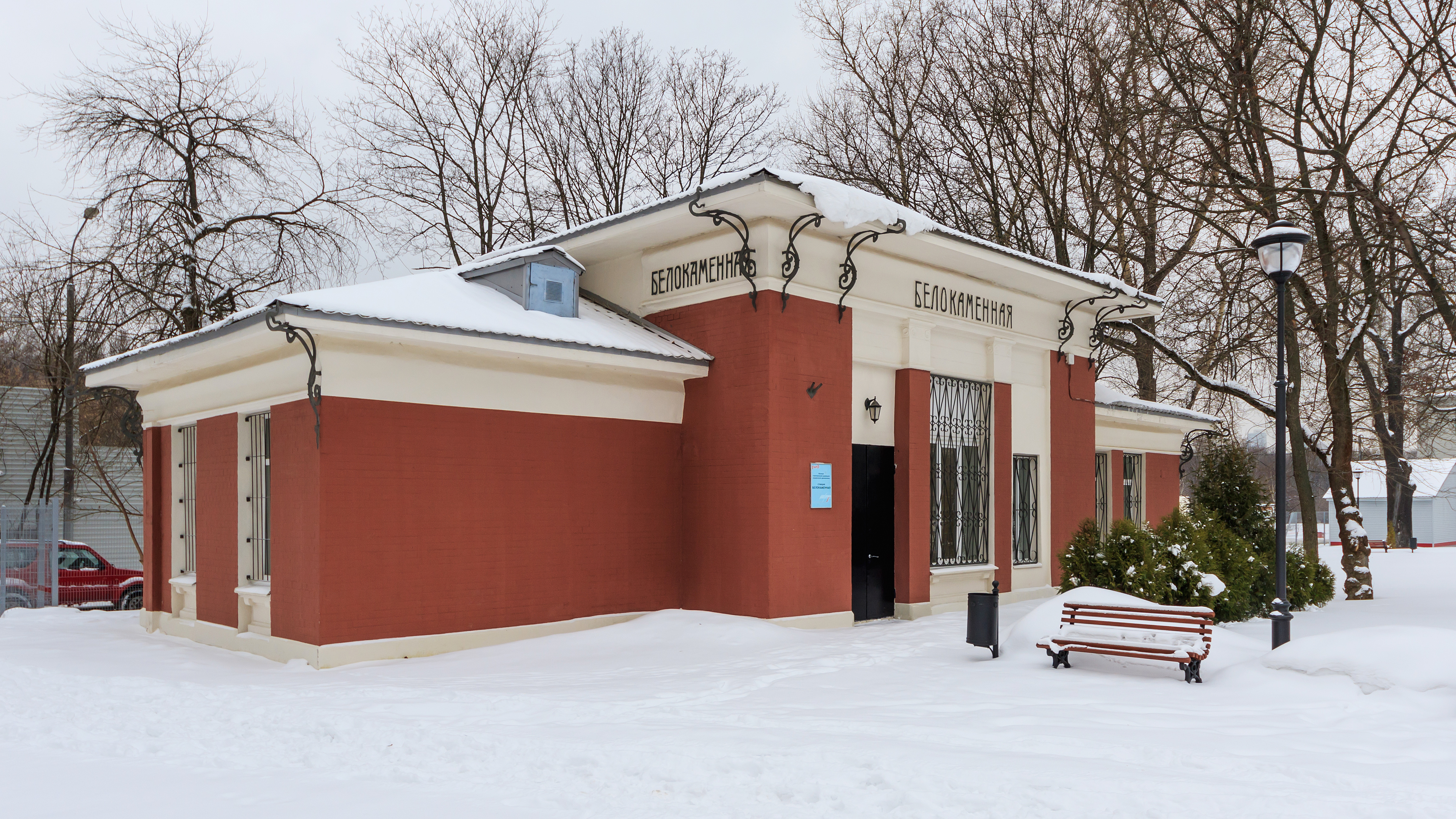
Old station building (1908)
