= VDNKh (Moscow Metro) =

Moscow Metro station

VDNKh ВДНХ
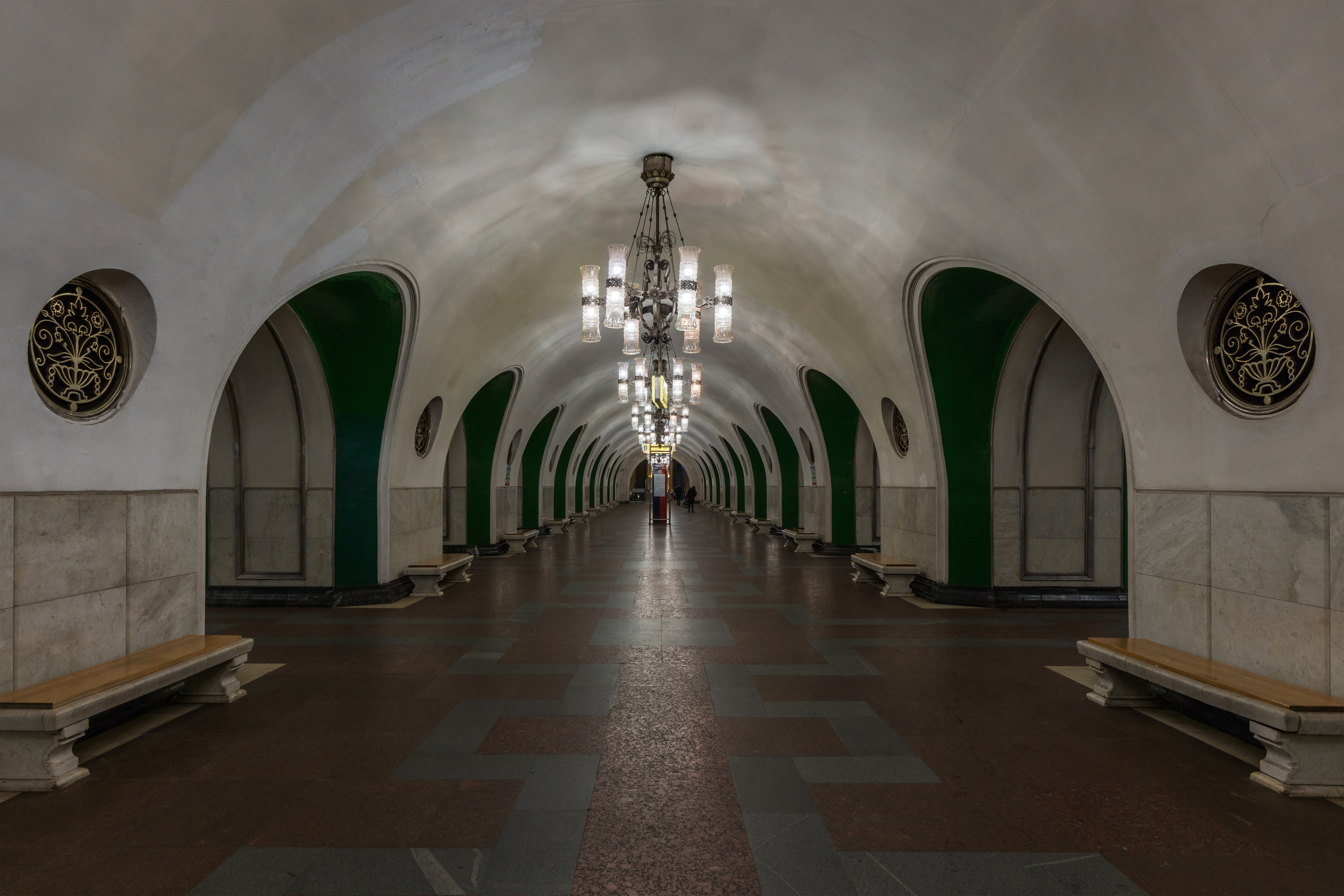

General information
- Location: Ostankinsky District; North-Eastern Administrative Okrug; Moscow; Russia
- Coordinates: 55.8211°N 37.6411°E
- System: Moscow Metro station
- Owner: Moskovsky Metropoliten
- Line: Kaluzhsko-Rizhskaya line
- Platforms: 1 island platform
- Tracks: 2
- Connections: Bus: м9, 15, 33, 56, 76, 85, 93, 136, 154, 172, 195, 244, 286, 375, 378, 379, 533, 544, 803, 834, 903, т13, т14, т76 Tram: 11, 17, 25

Construction
- Depth: 53.5 metres (176 ft) (deepest from Kaluzhsko-Rizhskaya Line)
- Platform levels: 1
- Parking: No

Other information
- Station code: 090, VS

History
- Opened: 1 May 1958; 68 years ago
- Former names: VSKhV (1958—1959)

Services
Preceding station	Moscow Metro	Following station
Alekseyevskaya towards Novoyasenevskaya	Kaluzhsko-Rizhskaya line	Botanichesky Sad towards Medvedkovo
Route map
Location
- Location within Moscow Metro

VDNKh (Russian: ВДНХ pronounced [vɛ dɛ ɛn xa]) is a Moscow Metro station in Ostankinsky District, North-Eastern Administrative Okrug, Moscow, Russia. It is located on the Kaluzhsko-Rizhskaya Line, between Alekseyevskaya and Botanichesky Sad stations. VDNKh was opened on 1 May 1958. The name stands for Exhibition of Achievements of the National Economy Vystavka Dostizheniy Narodnovo Khozyaystva (abbreviated VDNKh).

VDNKh is one of the deepest Moscow Metro stations, situated 53.5 metres (176 ft) below ground. It is also one of the busiest stations, serving 107,377 passengers a day in 2009.

Originally, this station was planned to be opulently decorated in the manner of the other stations built in the 1950s, with mosaics by venerable artist Vladimir Favorsky along the insides of the arches between the pylons. However, in the wake of Nikita Khrushchev's attack on decorative "excessions", the place for mosaics, including existing mosaics as well, were crudely coated with incongruous thick green paint.

It was the deepest station in Moscow Metro from 1958 until 1979.

== Transfers ==
Though not directly connected to VDNKh, Moscow Monorail station Vystavochny Tsentr was located within walking distance until 2025.

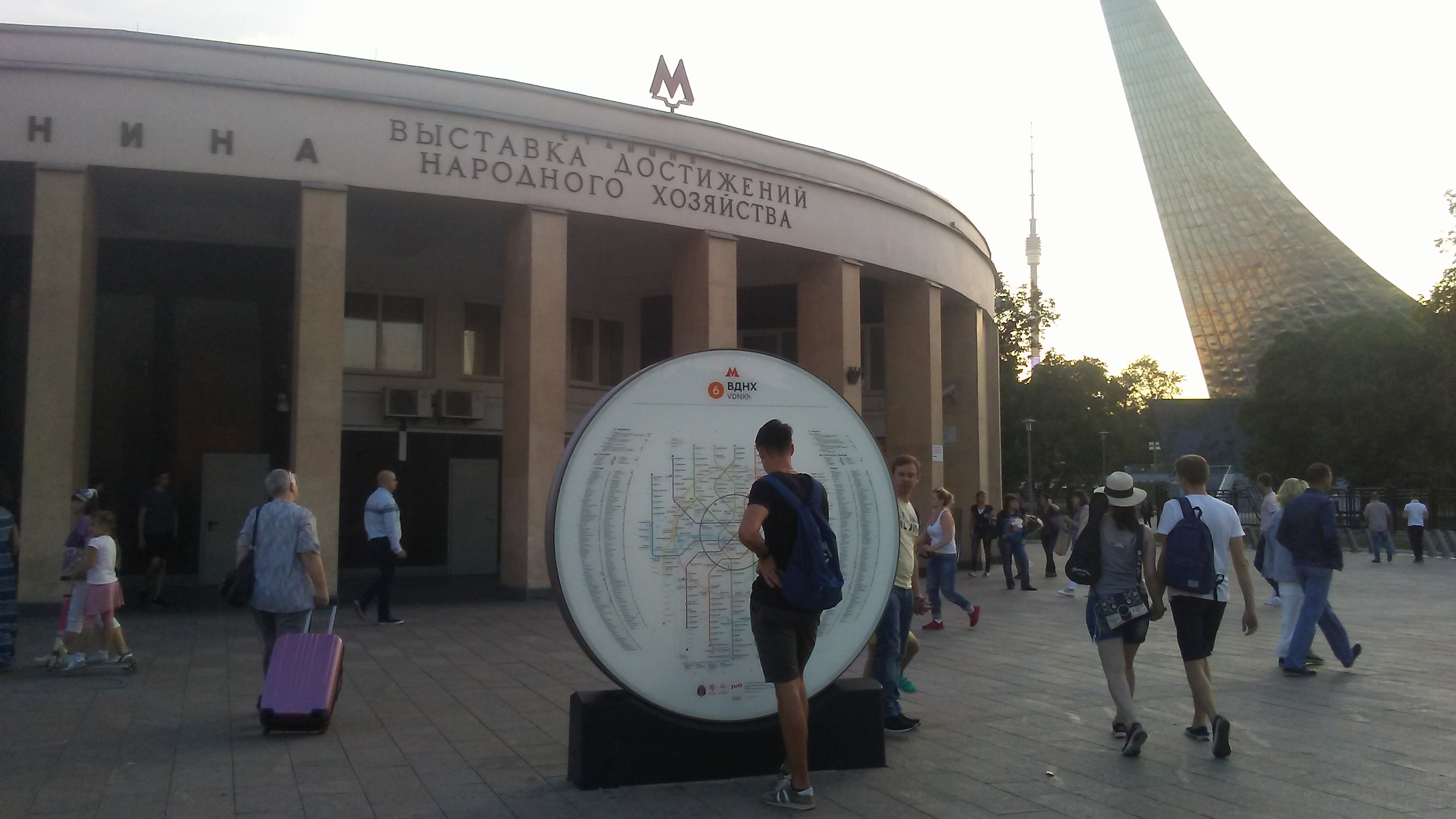
North vestibule

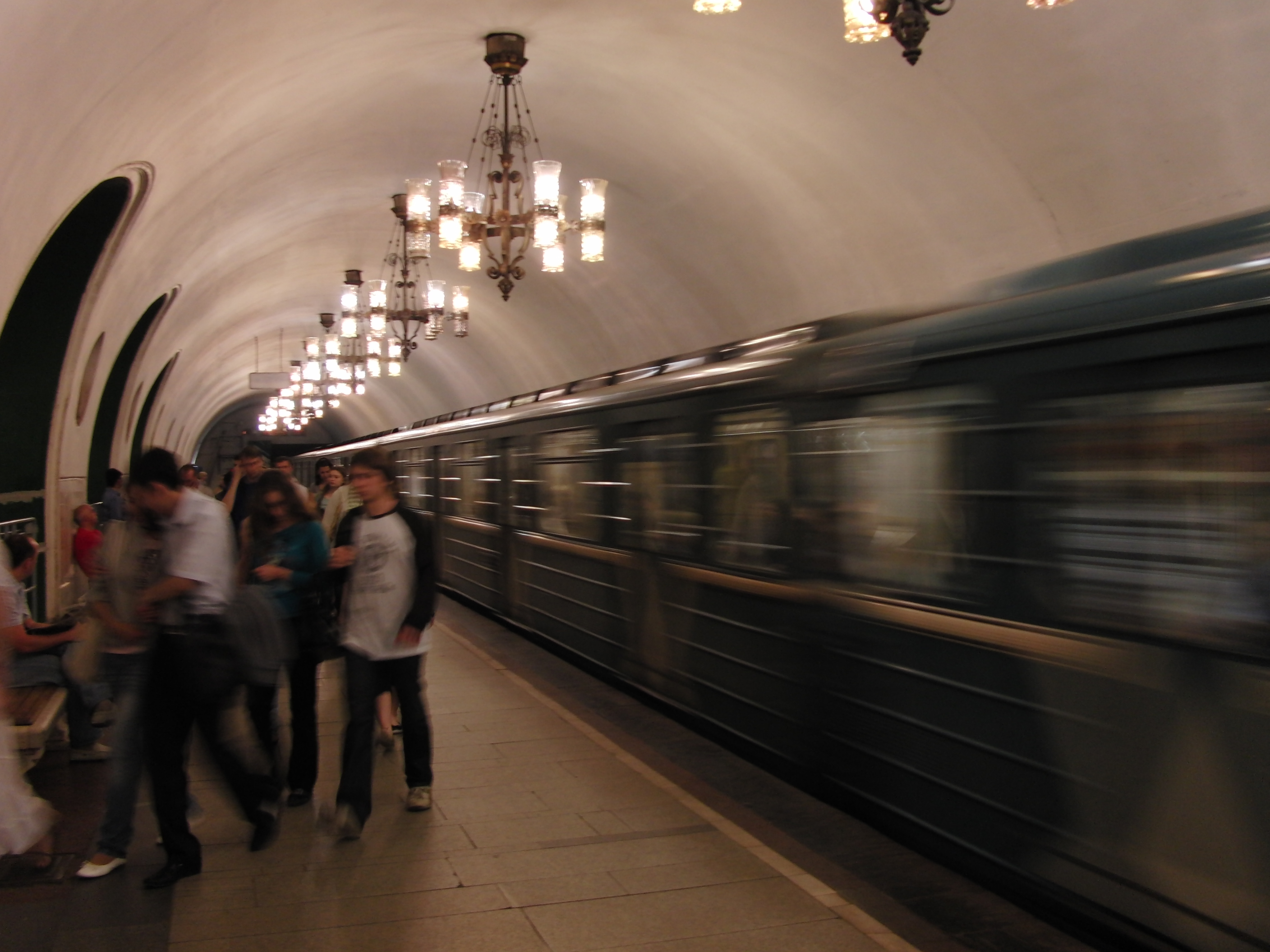
Station platform

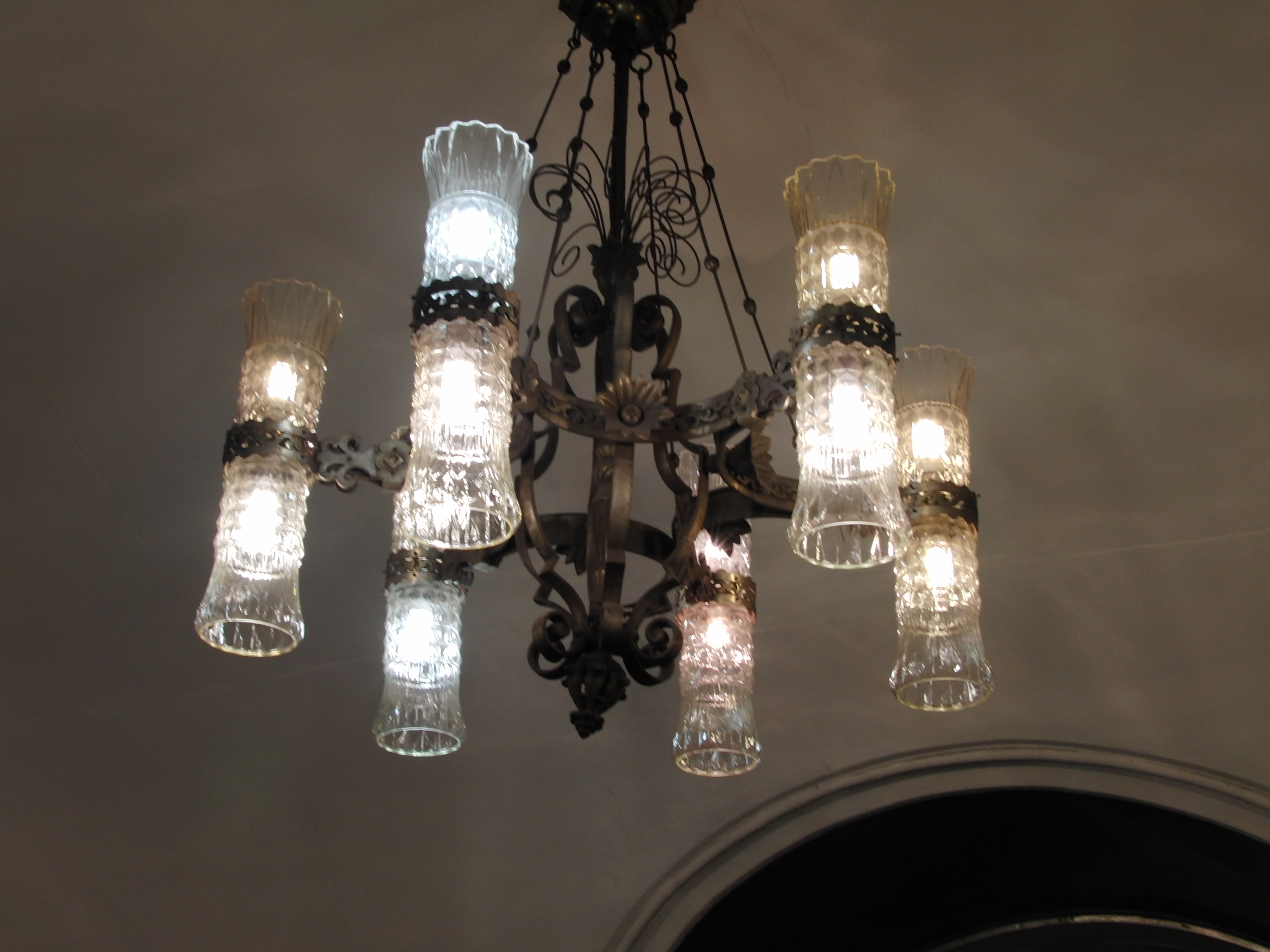
Station lighting (similar to Kiyevskaya (Arbatsko-Pokrovskaya Line)

== In popular culture ==
VDNKh is featured as the home of Artyom, the main protagonist in the novel and video game Metro 2033.
