= Rostokino (Moscow Central Circle) =

Station on the Moscow Central Circle

Rostokino Ростокино
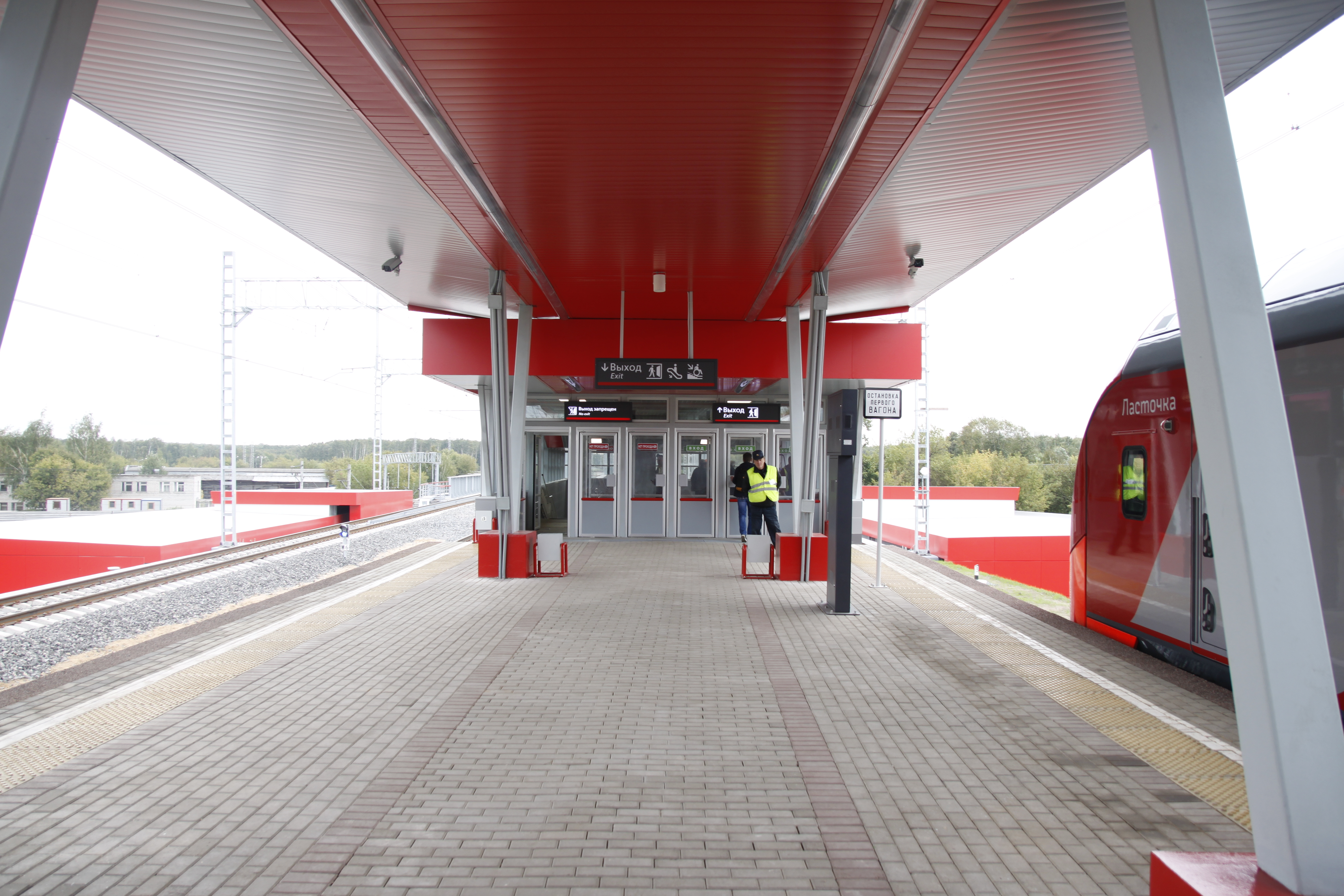

General information
- Coordinates: 55.8395°N 37.6676°E
- System: Moscow Metro
- Owner: Government of Moscow (MKZD)
- Operator: Russian Railways (within Moscow Metro)
- Line: Little Ring Railway
- Platforms: 1 island platform
- Tracks: 3
- Train operators: Russian Railways
- Connections: Tram Line 17; Bus stop

Construction
- Structure type: At-grade
- Cycle facilities: Yes
- Accessible: Yes

History
- Opened: 10 September 2016; 9 years ago

Services
Preceding station	Moscow Metro	Following station
Botanichesky Sad anticlockwise / outer	Moscow Central Circle	Belokamennaya clockwise / inner
Location
- Location within Moscow Metro

Rostokino (Russian: Ростокино) is a station on the Moscow Central Circle of the Moscow Metro that opened in September 2016.

== Name ==
The station name, which was originally planned to be Yaroslavskaya, was changed in August 2016 to Rostokino for the Rostokino District.

== Location and exits ==
The platform is located in the Yaroslavsky and Rostokino districts, near Mira Prospect, between the Botanichesky Sad passenger stop and the Belokamennaya station, east of the main track development of the Rostokino station. It offers a direct, underground interchange to the Rostokino platform of the Yaroslavsky direction of the Moscow Central Circle and, together with it, forms part of a transport interchange hub.

Free transfer is available to and from the Vystavochny Tsentr monorail station and the VDNKh metro station.

On September 6, 2019, a southern vestibule of the rebuilt Rostokino stop opened near the station's vestibule, enabling a covered, above-ground transfer; the reverse transfer involves exiting under a rain shelter.

== Gallery ==
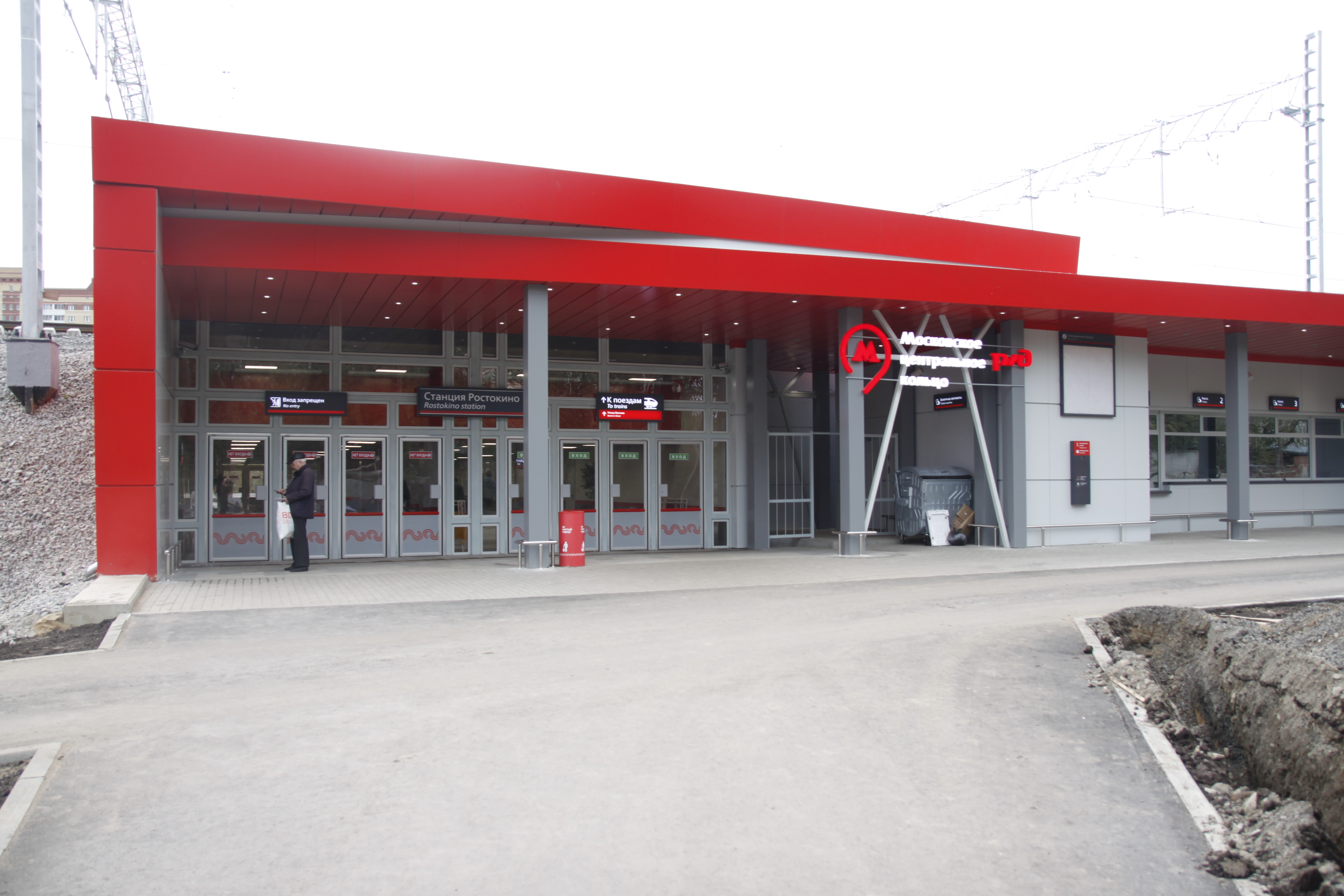

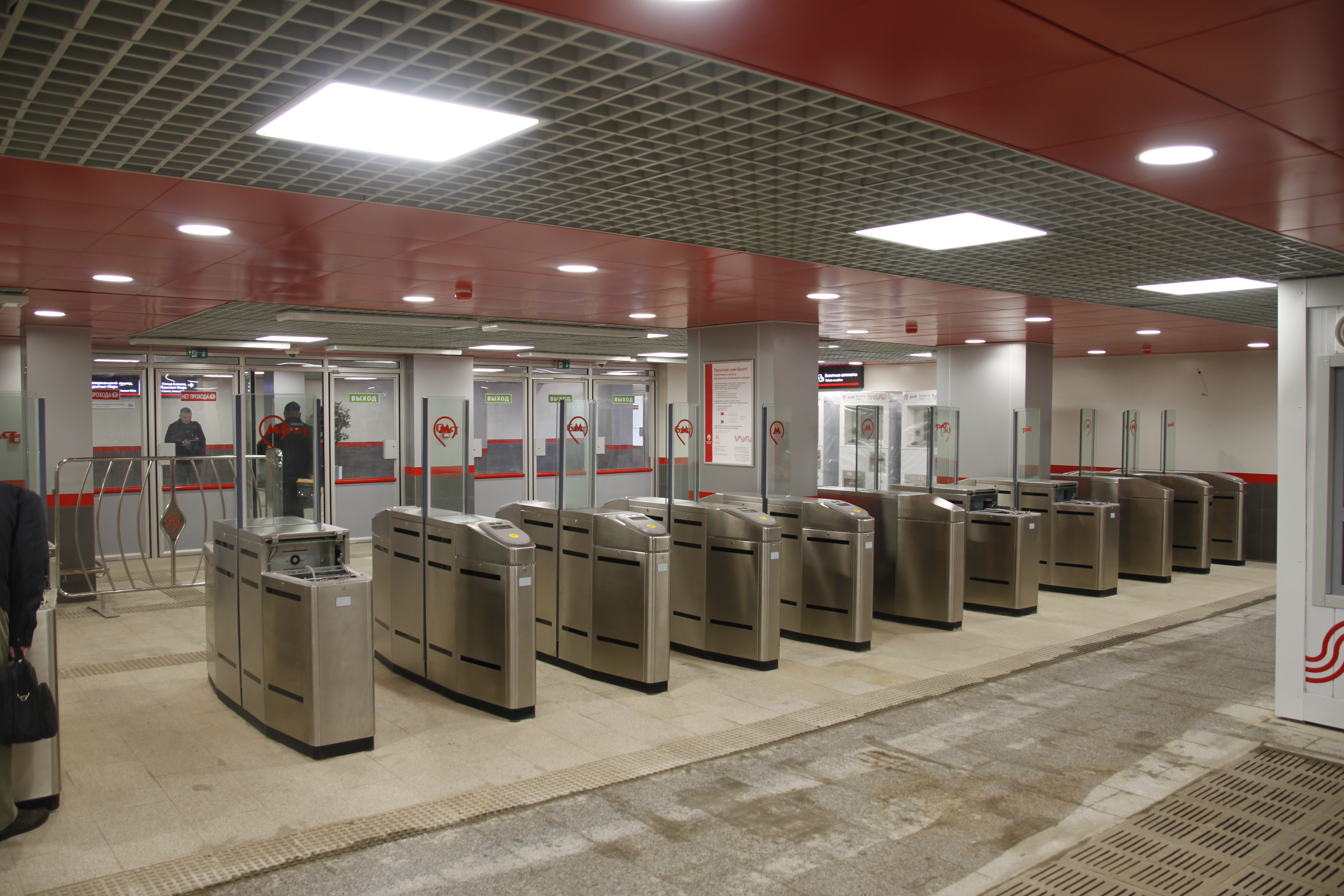

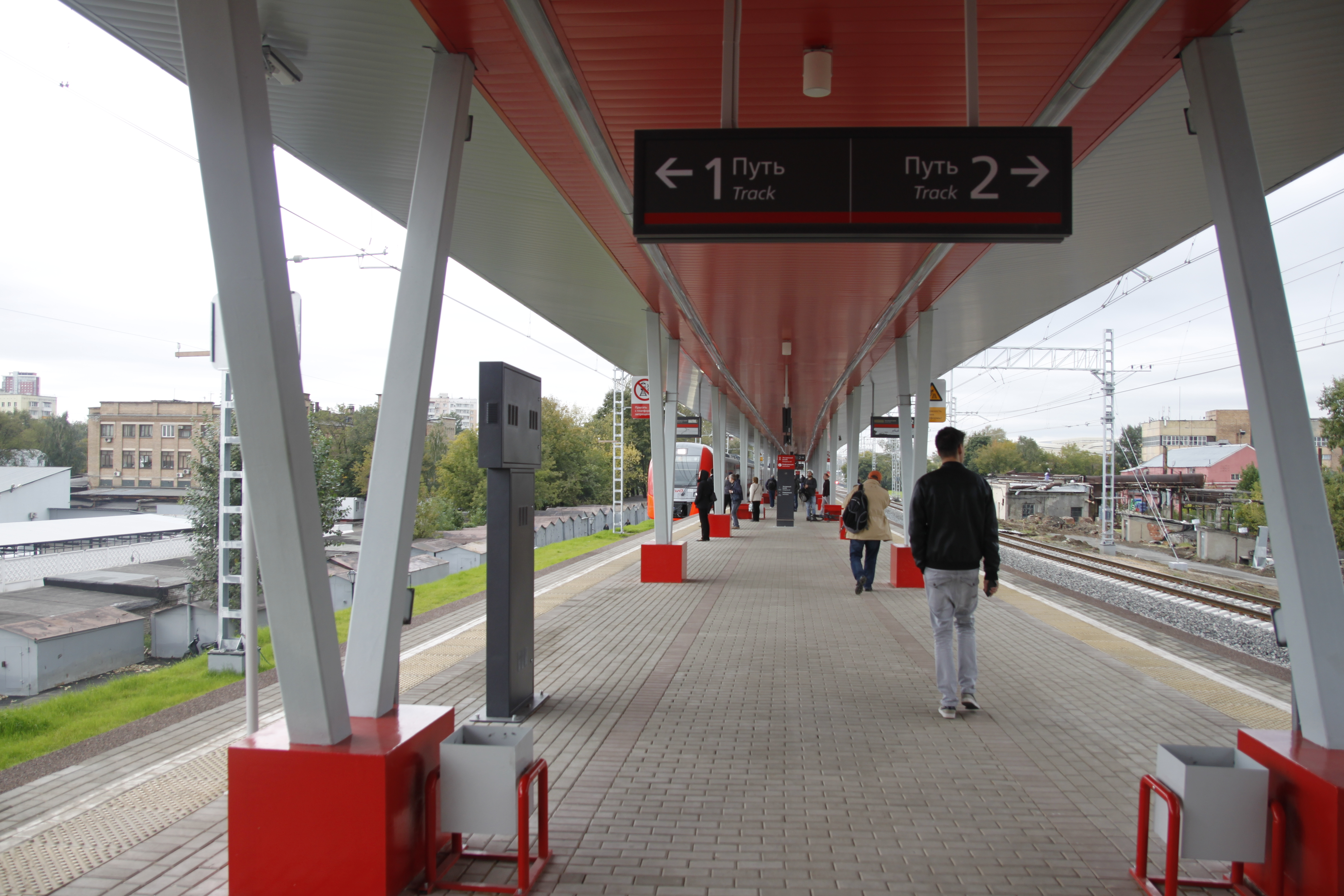
