= Little Ring of the Moscow Railway =

Orbital railway line in Moscow

Little Ring of the Moscow Railways

Overview
- Owner: Russian Railways
- Locale: Moscow
- Stations: 12 stopping points with freight yards (15 including stations on branches)

Service
- Type: Heavy rail, Commuter rail
- System: Moscow Railways
- Operator(s): Russian Railways

History
- Opened: 19 July 1908

Technical
- Line length: 54 km (34 mi)
- Character: Aboveground, surface, partially underground
- Track gauge: 1,520 mm (4 ft 11 27/32 in)
- Electrification: 3 kV DC overhead line

The Little Ring of the Moscow Railways (MK MZD, Russian: Малое кольцо Московской Железной Дороги), is a 54.4-kilometre-long (33.8 mi) orbital railway in Moscow, Russia.

Built between 1902 and 1908 as MOZD (Moscow Encircle Railway, Russian: Московская Окружная Железная Дорога, or just Encircle Line, Russian: Окружная линия) for mixed use railway traffic, after 1934 the railway was only used for cargo traffic. During the 2010s, the railway was converted to be used for commuter rail service and allows free transfers with the Moscow Metro; the passenger service on Moscow Ring Railway started on September 10, 2016, as the Moscow Central Circle. The line is operated by Russian Railways' Moscow subsidiary.

== History ==
Map of MOZD (Moscow Encircle Railway) in 1908

A train with two steam locomotives, class Э and class Л hauling a passenger coach during a retro-tour on Moscow Little Ring Railway, November 2013, before the line's electrification.

In 1800, the Kamer-Kollezhsky Val, the third historical ring of Moscow (after Boulevard Ring and Garden Ring), became the legal outer border of Moscow. In 1879, some additional areas, including Sokolniki, were annexed to the city; however, at the time Moscow was encircled by a number of further settlements forming an urban agglomeration. Transport connections between these suburbs were poor. A number of proposals to build a ring railroad around the center to solve this were made in the 1860s and the 1870s. One such project was rejected in 1877 by the Moscow City Duma which cited inefficiency. However, the transportation problems became increasingly obvious, and in 1898 after Tsar Nicholas II sent a message to the City Duma declaring that it was desirable to build a railroad, a project competition was opened. The project by Pyotr Rashevsky, who proposed to build a ring of the total length of 54.4 kilometres (33.8 mi), won the competition.

Construction started in 1902, and the railway was completed with the first train running in July 1907. In 1908, the railroad was declared to be completed, and it became part of the Nikolayevskaya Railway, the main line of which ran between Moscow and Saint Petersburg. A Passenger service was organized of four trains per day. The trains first stopped in Nikolayevsky Railway Station before joining the ring at the Presnya Station. Here trains were divided into two, with one train running clockwise, and the other one running counterclockwise.

The Directorate of the Nikolayevskaya Railway was located in Saint Petersburg, and thus it was inconvenient for Moscow decision making. In 1916 control of the ring railway was transferred to the Moscow-Kursk Railway. In 1934 it became a separate railway before in 1956 being included in the Moscow Railway.

The Circle Railway became known as Little Ring of the Moscow Railway after the 584 km Greater Ring of the Moscow Railway, 40–100 km (25–62 mi) from the city centre, was completed during the Second World War.

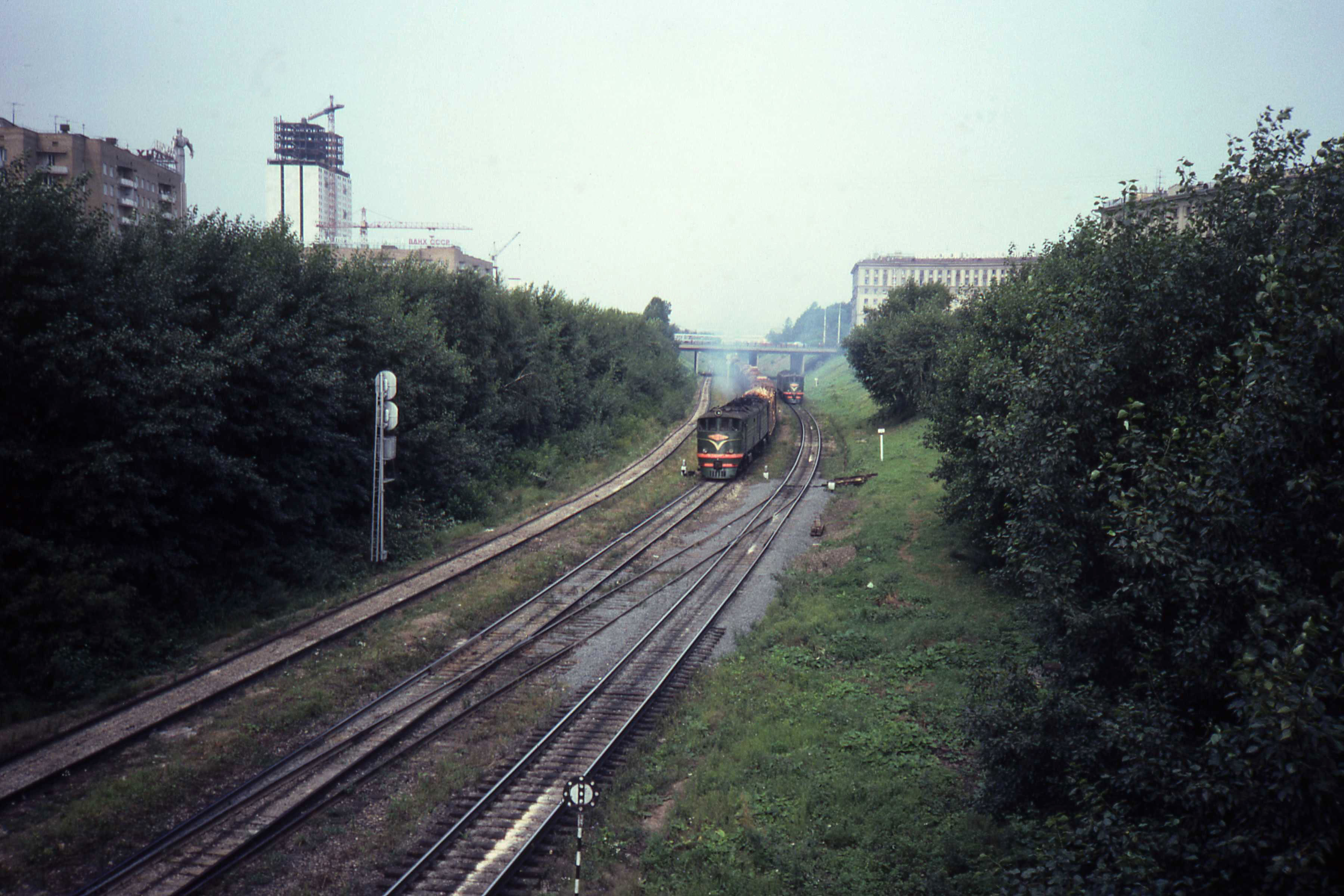
SZD TE3 with freight train at Gagarina Square (1982). In the 2000s this section was covered.

Between 1917 and 1960, the Moscow Little Ring Railway served as the border of the city of Moscow. In 1960, the Moscow Ring Road, a new beltway far outside of the Moscow Little Ring Railway, then just about to be completed, became the new official boundary of the city.

On November 18, 1994, Andrey Shchelenkov died from the explosion of his own bomb targeting the river bridge between Vladykino and Rostokino stations. The explosion was not strong, and the bridge survived. Shchelenkov had ties to organized criminal Maxim Lazovsky but the motive remains unknown.

By 2012, there were twelve freight stations operating on the railway.

The line was reconstructed during the period of 2013–2016 for joint passenger and freight use. The reconstruction process included:

- Electrification of the whole line with 3 kV DC overhead wires and the construction of substations
- Construction of new passenger stations and rehabilitation of old stations
- Construction of an additional third track on the northern half of the circle for freight trains
- Construction of depot for EMU trains at Podmoskovnaya stations
- Construction of interchanges with existing Moscow Metro stations.

== Moscow Central Circle Line ==
Map of Little Ring Moscow Railway

The Moscow Central Circle is a passenger metropolitan line that runs along the Little Ring of the Moscow Railway, operated by Russian Railways as subcontractor for Moscow Metro. It was opened for passengers on September 10, 2016, after a four-year construction period. The passenger service is operated by 33 Siemens ES2G Lastochka trains.

== Stopping points ==
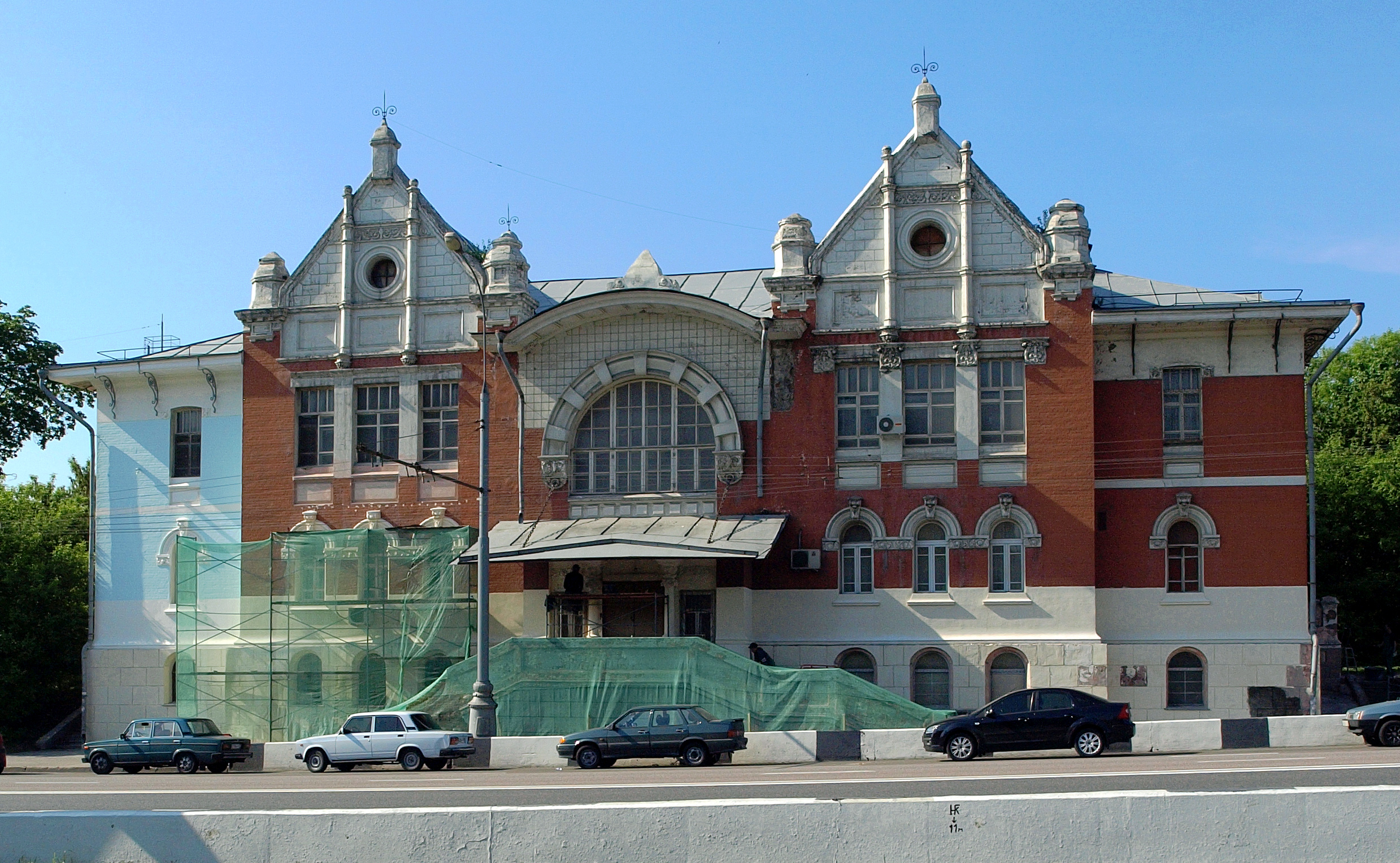
Vorobyovy Gory Station building.

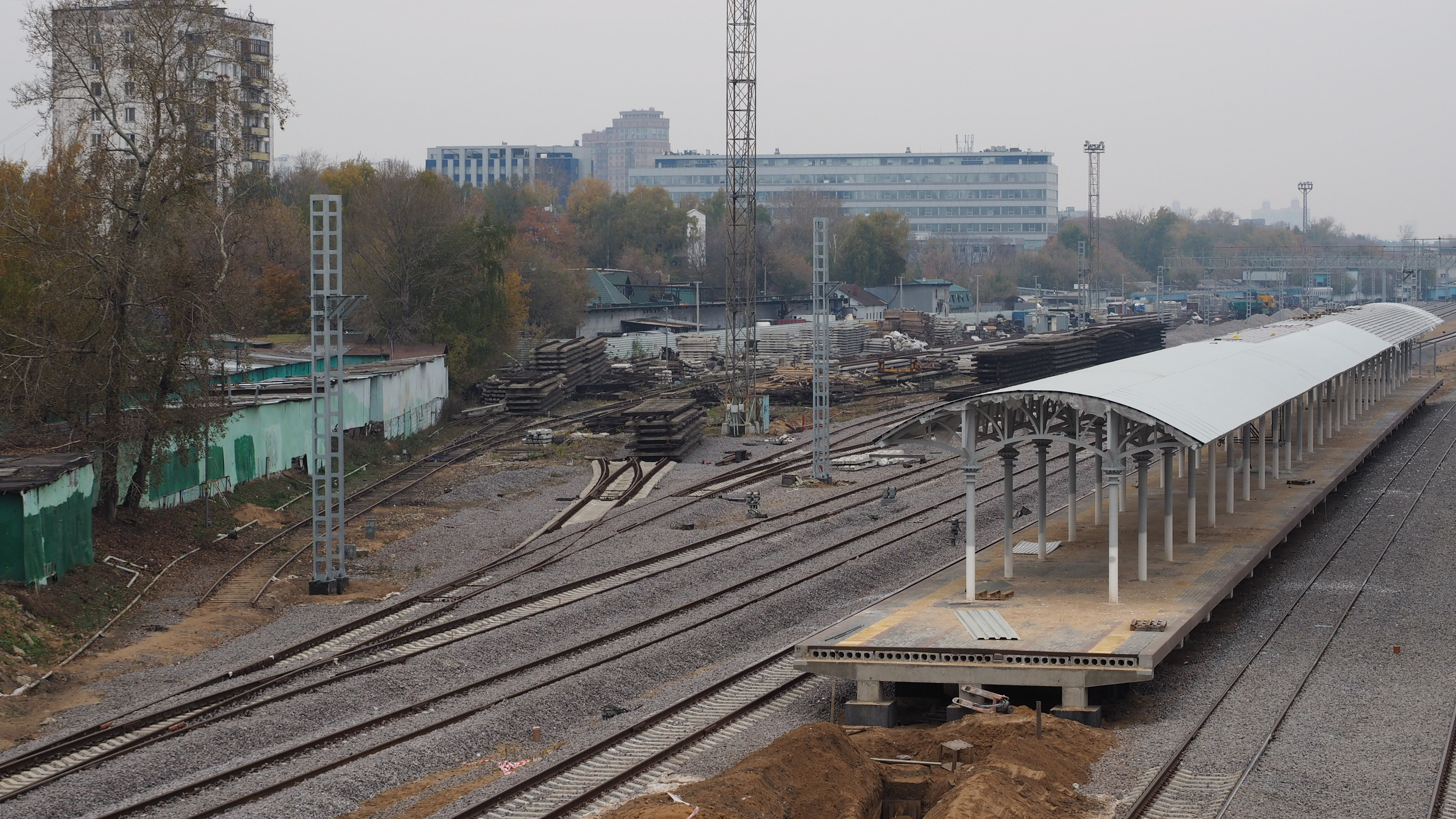
Construction of the Panfilovskaya MCC station on the Serebryany Bor Station

The following is the list of the original 1908 stations and yards and some other later stations on the line (clockwise from north):

1. Vladykino (opened 1908);
2. Rostokino (opened 1908);
3. Belokamennaya (opened 1908);
4. Cherkizovo (opened 1908); known as Lokomotiv on the Moscow Central Circle line
5. Lefortovo (opened 1908); known as Shosse Entuziastov on the Moscow Central Circle line
6. Andronovka (opened 1908);
7. Ugreshskaya (opened 1908);
8. Kozhukhovo (opened 1908);
9. Kanatchikovo (opened 1908);
10. Neskuchnoye (halt, defunct as of 2014);
11. Vorobyovy Gory (not in use as of 2014);
12. Potylikha (halt, not in use as of 2014);
13. Kutuzovo (not in use as of 2014); re-opened as Kutuzovskaya station on the Moscow Central Circle line
14. Presnya;
15. Voyennoye Pole (halt, defunct as of 2014);
16. Serebryany Bor (opened 1908);
17. Bratsevo (not in use as of 2014);
18. Likhobory (opened 1908).
19. Kotly (opened 1908 halt, defunct as of 2014);

Since September 10, 2016, the re-developed Central Circle Line has been in operation using this route, initially with 26 stations, and with 5 further stations opened in November 2016).

== See also ==
- Moscow Central Circle (uses MOZhD's land)
- Greater Ring of the Moscow Railway
