= Profsoyuznaya Street (Moscow) =

Street in Moscow, Russia

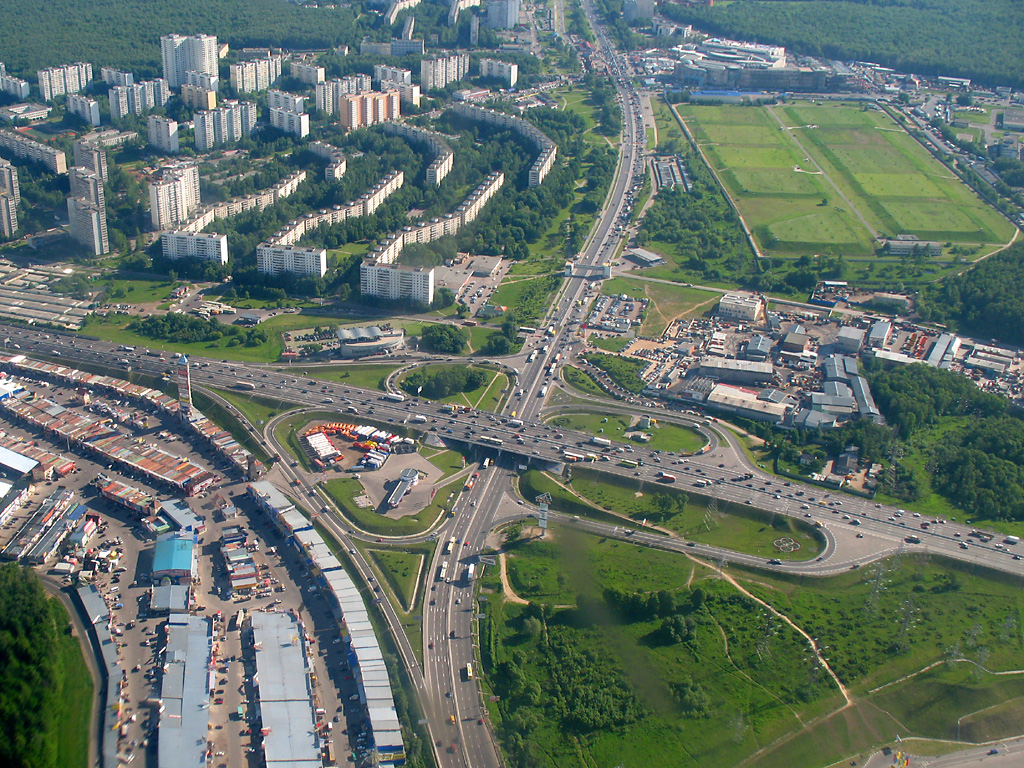

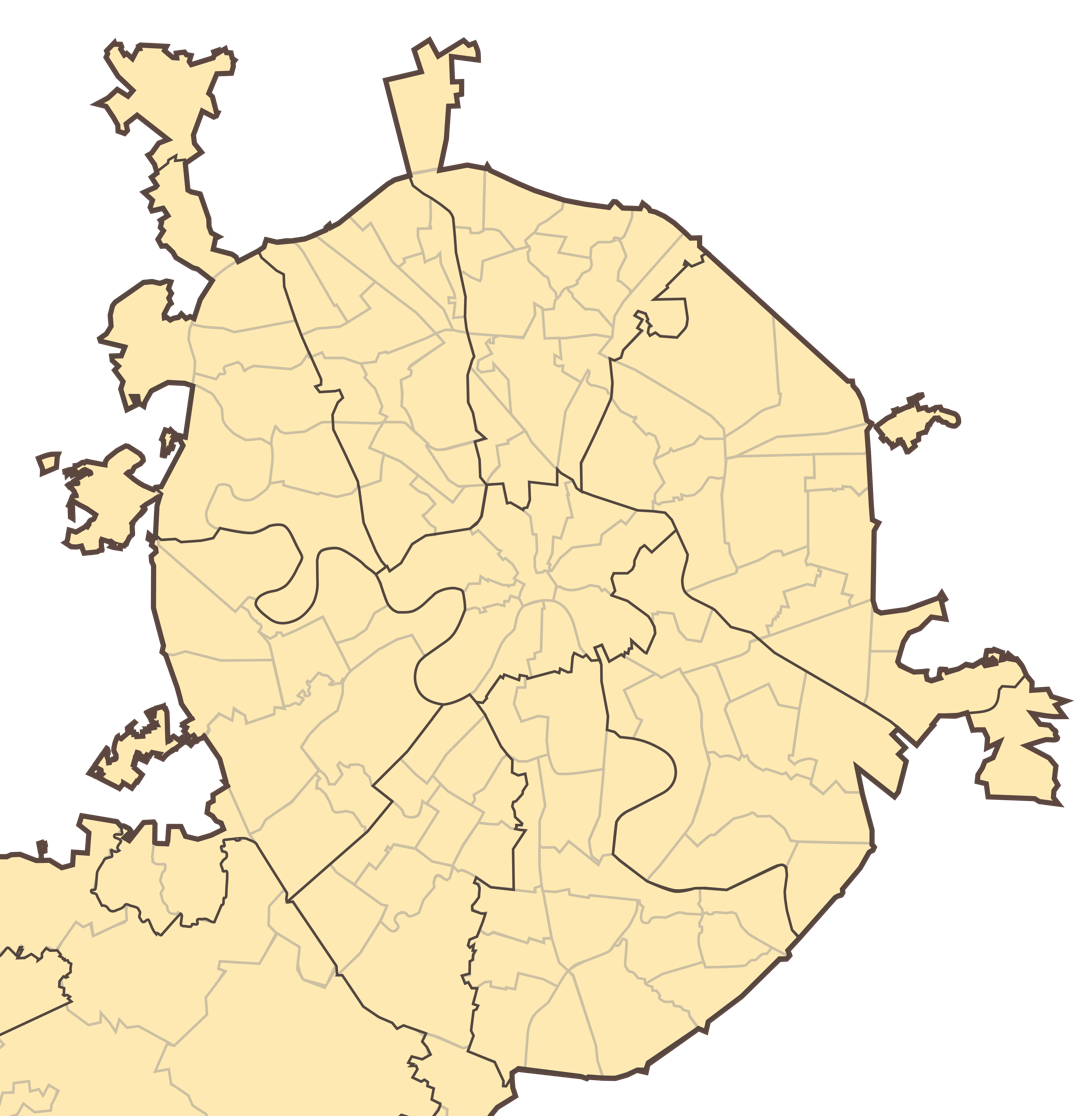
- Native name: Профсою́зная улица (Russian)
- Former name: 4-я Черёмушкинская улица (4th Cheryomushkinskaya Street)
- Namesake: Trade union
- Length: 9.3 km (5.8 mi)
- Postal code: 117437, 117485, 117465, 117335, 117321, 117393, 117420, 117647, 117279, 117036, 117292, 117418, 117218, 117342
- Nearest metro station: Akademicheskaya; Profsoyuznaya; Novye Cheryomushki; Kaluzhskaya; Vorontsovskaya; Belyayevo; Konkovo; Tyoply Stan
- Coordinates: 55°39′01″N 37°32′00″E

Profsoyuznaya Street (name since 7 February 1958) is a street in the South-Western Administrative Okrug of Moscow in the Akademichesky, Konkovo, Obruchevsky, Tyoply Stan, Cheryomushki, and Yasenevo districts.

The street runs from Ho Chi Minh Square to the Moscow Ring Road. Further beyond the Moscow Ring Road, it continues as the federal highway A130 to Troitsk, Obninsk, and Roslavl and is called Kaluzhskoye Highway. Profsoyuznaya Street intersects Dmitry Ulyanov Street (Ho Chi Minh Square at the intersection), Kedrov, Krzhizhanovsky, Nakhimovsky Prospekt (Josip Broz Tito Square at the intersection), Garibaldi, Nametkin, Obruchev, Butlerov, Miklouho-Maclay Streets (Martin Luther King Square at the intersection), Ostrovityanov Streets; to the left of Profsoyuznaya Street, General Antonov Street (between Butlerova and Miklukho-Maklaya Streets), Sanatornaya Alley leading to the Uzkoye estate, Novoyasenevsky Prospekt branch off from Profsoyuznaya Street; on the right, Tyoply Stan and (in the immediate vicinity of the Moscow Ring Road) General Tyulenev streets merge into it. Profsoyuznaya Street is one of the main thoroughfares of the south-west of Moscow. From the Konkovo metro station to the intersection with Akademika Kapitsa Street, it also acts as a border between the Konkovo and Tyoply Stan districts.

== Origin of the name ==
It was named on 7 February 1958 in honour of Soviet trade unions and their 40th anniversary. In 1955–1958, part of the street was called the 4th Cheryomushkinskaya Street after the development of the Cheryomushki area.

== History ==
The street appeared in the early 1950s after the development of the 1st quarter of Novye Cheryomushki and originally did not have a name. In 1951, the first bus route, No. 28, was built on it. The oldest part of Profsoyuznaya Street between Dmitry Ulyanov and Krzhizhanovsky Streets was built up in 1952–1956. The next section of Profsoyuznaya Street to Garibaldi Street was laid out in 1963. In 1961–1962, 1972-1974 and 1986–1988, the Kaluzhsko-Rizhskaya metro line was built under the street. In the early 1970s, Profsoyuznaya Street was extended to the Moscow Ring Road parallel to the old Kaluzhskoye Highway, which soon lost its importance as a transport highway, and then partially disappeared, partly preserved in the form of secondary passages. In the second half of the 1960s and the first half of the 1970s, on Profsoyuznaya Street, on the site of the former villages and hamlets of Belyaevo-Dalnee, Derevlyovo, Sergievskoye-Konkovo, Konkovo-Troitskoye, Verkhniye and Nizhnie Teplyye Stany, the residential areas of Belyaevo-Bogorodskoye, Konkovo-Derevlyovo and Tyoply Stan were built. In 1977, in commemoration of the 60th anniversary of the October Revolution, the initial part of the street was renamed 60th Anniversary of October Avenue, as a result of which all the house numbers along the multi-kilometer street had to be reduced: house No. 24 received No. 2, and No. 25 received No. 1, etc. In 1978, a trolleybus line (route 72) was built along a significant section of Profsoyuznaya Street. In 2003, three squares dedicated to the Russian poets Pushkin, Lermontov and Tyutchev were created at the beginning of the street. On 24 October 2013, a two-level traffic interchange with an overpass was opened at the intersection of Profsoyuznaya Street with Tyoply Stan Street and Novoyasenevsky Prospekt.

== Terrain ==
Profsoyuznaya Street rises to the Teplostan Upland. The most significant ascents are from Nakhimovsky Prospekt to Garibaldi Street and from Obrucheva Street to Butlerova Street. On Profsoyuznaya Street, at the junction of Novoyasenevsky Prospekt, there is the highest point in Moscow, the height of which is 255 metres (837 ft) above sea level.

== Transport ==
There are 7 stations of the Kaluzhsko-Rizhskaya Moscow Metro line on Profsoyuznaya Street: Akademicheskaya, Profsoyuznaya, Novye Cheryomushki, Kaluzhskaya, Belyayevo, Konkovo, Tyoply Stan, and 1 station of the Big Circle Line: Vorontsovskaya. Buses 1, 41, 196, 235, 699, T72 pass along significant sections of the street.
