= Nakhimovsky =

Nakhimovsky (masculine), Nakhimovskaya (feminine), or Nakhimovskoye (neuter) may refer to:

- Nakhimov Raion (Nakhimovsky District), an administrative district of Sevastopol, a city on the Crimean Peninsula, which is disputed between Russia and Ukraine
- Nakhimovsky (rural locality) (Nakhimovskaya, Nakhimovskoye), several rural localities in Russia
- 5667 Nakhimovskaya, a main-belt asteroid

== See also ==
- Nakhimovsky Prospekt, a station of the Moscow Metro, Moscow, Russia
