= Konkovo =

Konkovo may refer to:

- Konkovo District, an administrative district (raion) of South-Western Administrative Okrug, Moscow, Russia
- Konkovo (Moscow Metro), a station on the Kaluzhsko-Rizhskaya Line of the Moscow Metro
- Konkovo (Novgorod Oblast), Russia
- Konkovo (Ukraine), a place in Donetsk Oblast, Ukraine
