= Tyoply Stan =

Tyoply Stan may refer to:

- Tyoply Stan District, a district of Moscow, Russia
- Tyoply Stan (Moscow Metro), a station of the Moscow Metro, Russia
- Tyoply Stan Street
