= Kaluzhskaya (Moscow Metro) =

Moscow Metro station

Kaluzhskaya Калужская
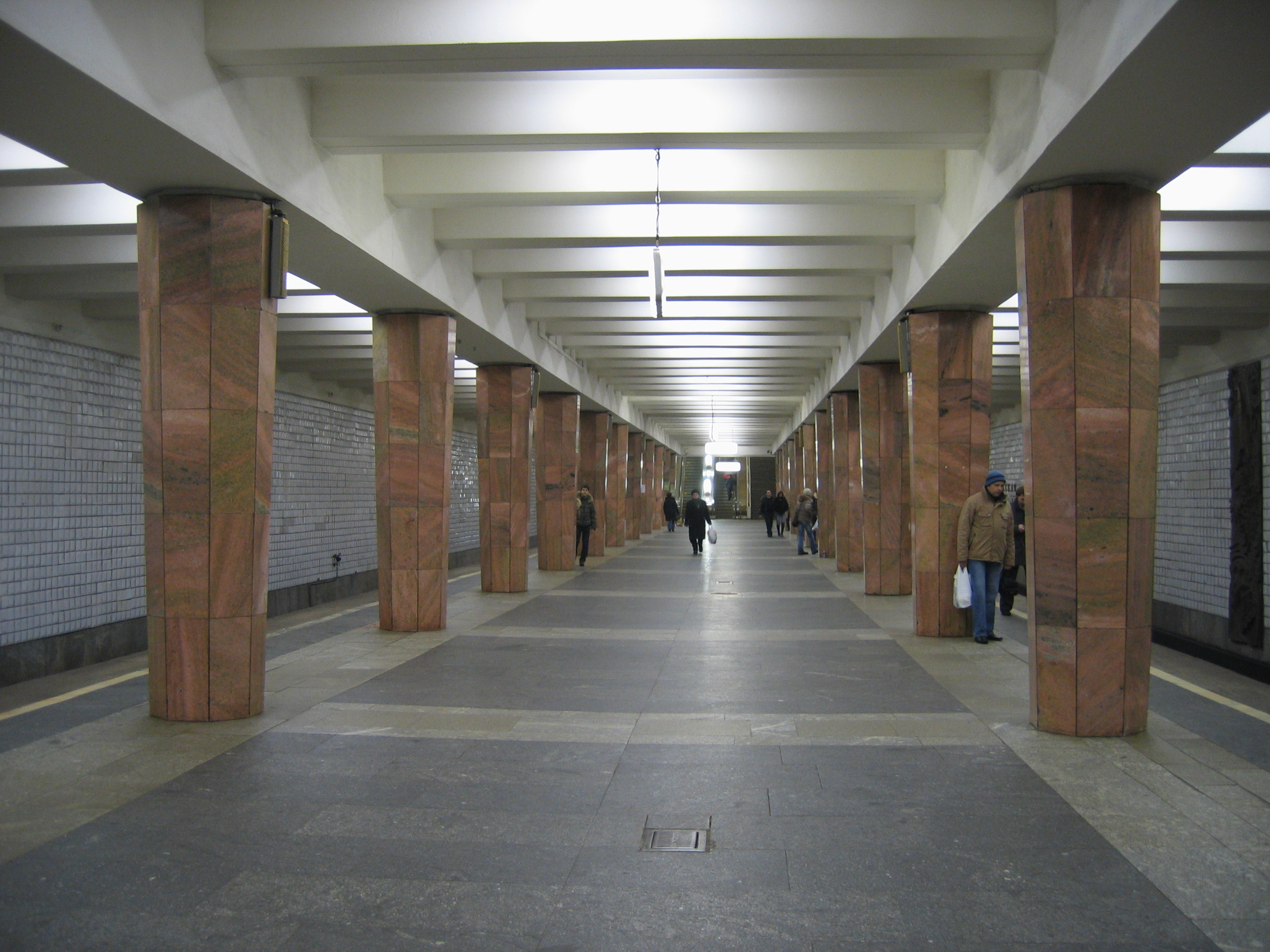

General information
- Location: Cheryomushki District; Obruchevsky District; Konkovo District; South-Western Administrative Okrug; Moscow; Russia
- Coordinates: 55.6571°N 37.5405°E
- System: Moscow Metro station
- Owner: Moskovsky Metropoliten
- Line: Kaluzhsko-Rizhskaya line
- Platforms: 1
- Tracks: 2
- Connections: Bus: 1, 28, 41, 163, 196, 224, 226, 235, 246, 295, 363, 624, 642, 661, 671, 699, 816; Trolleybus: 72

Construction
- Depth: 10 metres (33 ft)
- Platform levels: 1
- Parking: No

Other information
- Station code: 104

History
- Opened: 12 August 1974; 52 years ago

Passengers
- 2002: 22,739,500

Services
Preceding station	Moscow Metro	Following station
Belyayevo towards Novoyasenevskaya	Kaluzhsko-Rizhskaya line	Novye Cheryomushki towards Medvedkovo
Zyuzino anticlockwise / outer	Bolshaya Koltsevaya line transfer at Vorontsovskaya	Novatorskaya clockwise / inner
Route map
Location
- Location within Moscow Metro

Kaluzhskaya (Russian: Калужская) is a station on the Kaluzhsko-Rizhskaya Line of the Moscow Metro. It is named after the Russian town of Kaluga. Kaluzhskaya opened on 12 August 1974, replacing a temporary station of the same name (located in a service bay of the nearby Kaluzhskoe Depot) that had been operating since 1964. The new station was built to the column tri-span design with tapered octagonal columns in place of the usual square ones. Also the step of the columns was extended from 4 metres to 6.5, and the height of the ceiling raised. The columns are faced with pink Baikal marble, the walls are tiled with white ceramic and decorated with metallic artworks (works of A. Leonteva and M. Shmakova); the floor is laid with grey granite. The architects of the station were N. Demchinskiy and Yuliya Kolesnikova.

Passengers can transfer to Vorontsovskaya station of the Bolshaya Koltsevaya line.

The entrances to the station are spread out along Profsoyuznaya Street north of Obruchev street as well as onto the Academicial Keldysh square. Its daily passenger traffic is 131,000.

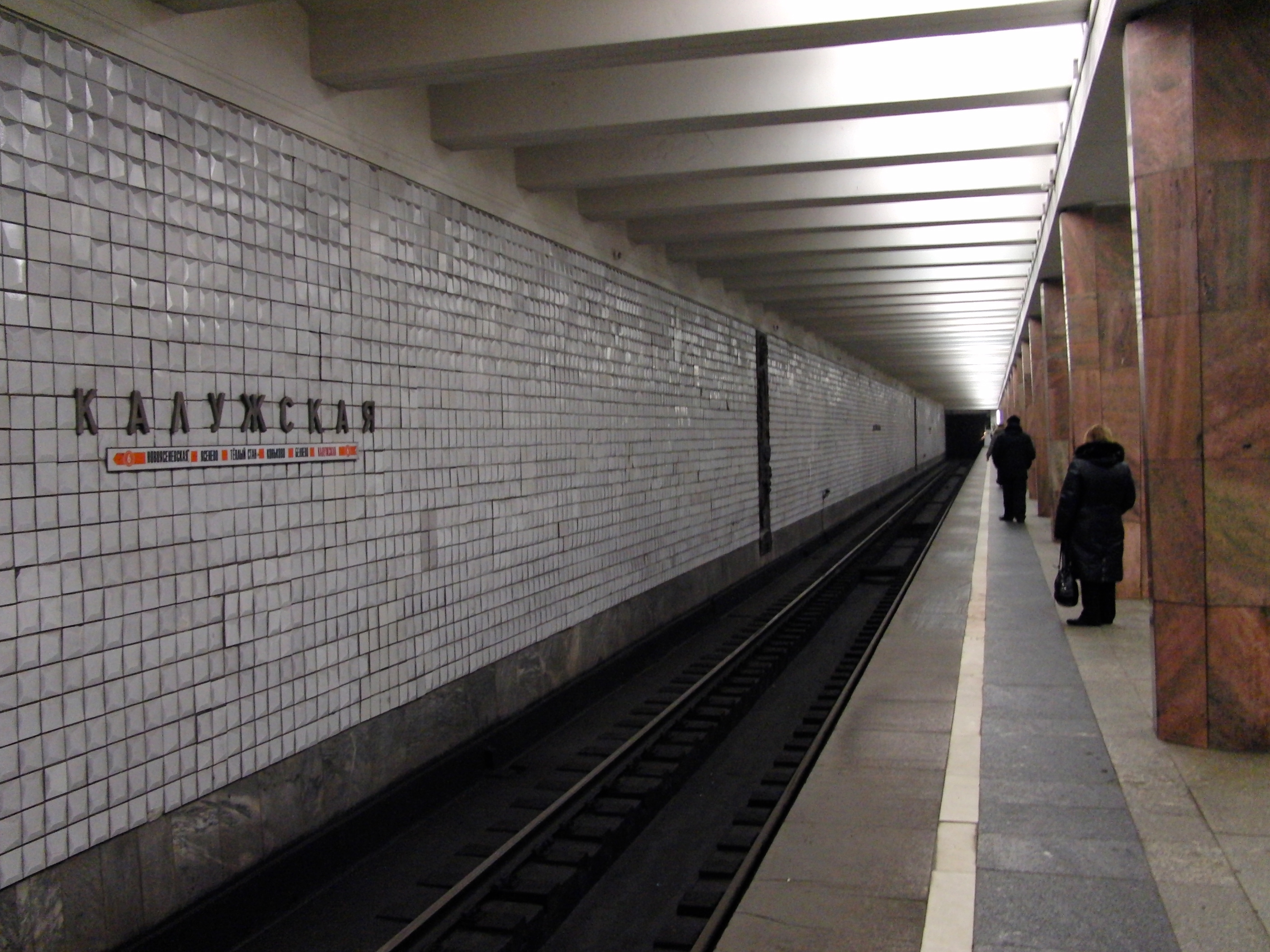
Platform view
