= Profsoyuznaya =

Profsoyuznaya may refer to:

- Profsoyuznaya (Moscow Metro)
- Profsoyuznaya (Volgograd Metro)
- Profsoyuznaya Street (Moscow), very important street in South-Western Administrative Okrug
- Profsoyuznaya Street (Lipetsk)
- Profsoyuznaya Street (Reutov)
- Profsoyuznaya Street (Dmitrov)
- Profsoyuznaya Street (Rostov-on-Don)
