= Vorontsovskaya (Moscow Metro) =

Moscow Metro station

Vorontsovskaya Воронцовская
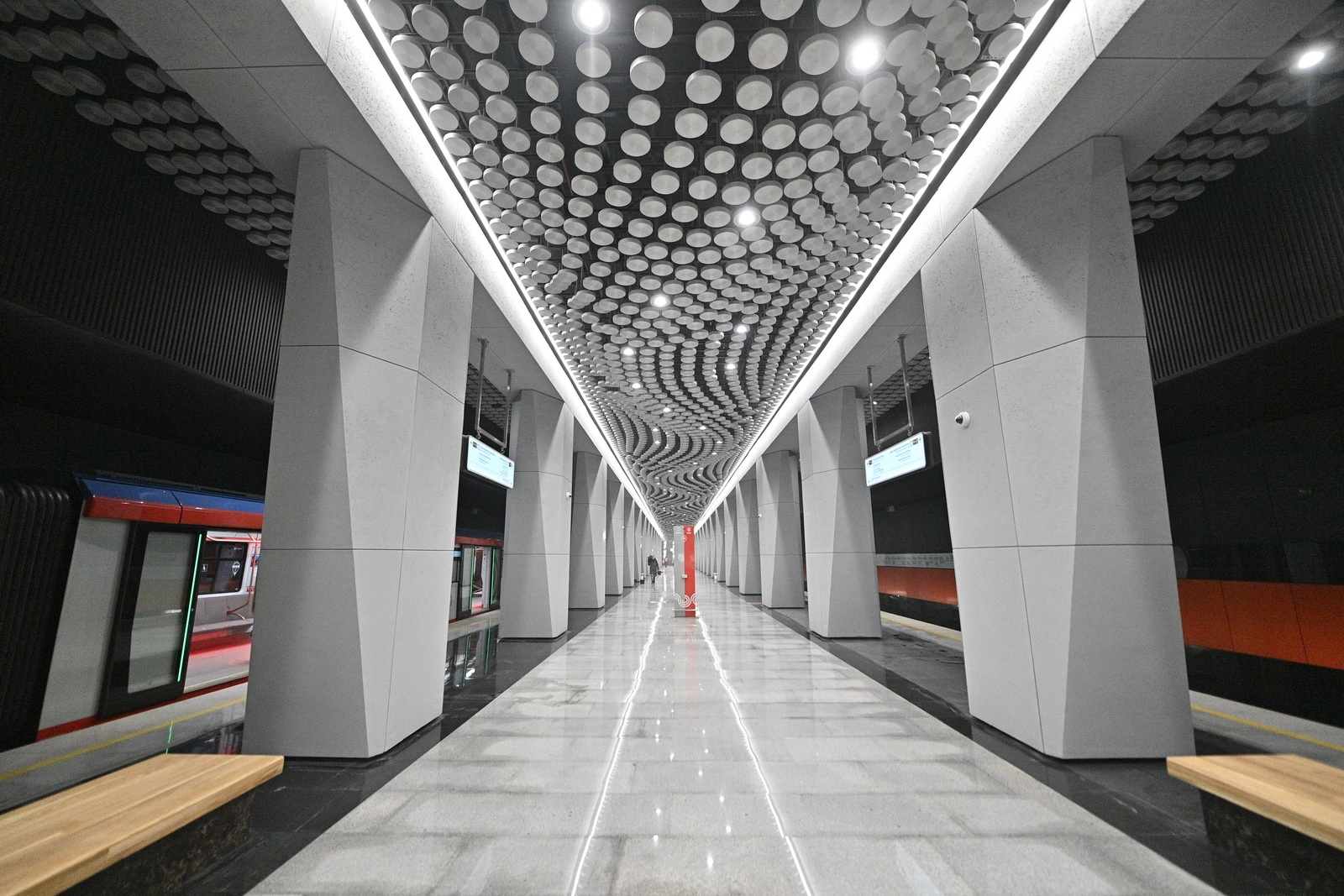
- Vorontsovskaya metro station

General information
- Location: Moscow; Russia
- Coordinates: 55.65871°N 37.53987°E
- System: Moscow Metro station
- Owner: Moskovsky Metropoliten
- Line: Bolshaya Koltsevaya line
- Tracks: 2
- Connections: Bus: м84, е12, 1, 41, с163, 194, 224, 226, 235, 246, 295, 404, 642, 699, 816, 938, 961, т72

Construction
- Structure type: Underground
- Depth: 23 m (75 ft)
- Parking: No

History
- Opened: 7 December 2021; 4 years ago

Services
Preceding station	Moscow Metro	Following station
Zyuzino anticlockwise / outer	Bolshaya Koltsevaya line	Novatorskaya clockwise / inner
Belyayevo towards Novoyasenevskaya	Kaluzhsko-Rizhskaya line transfer at Kaluzhskaya	Novye Cheryomushki towards Medvedkovo
Route map
Bolshaya Koltsevaya line
Location
- Location within Moscow Metro

Vorontsovskaya (Russian: Воронцовская) is a metro station on Bolshaya Koltsevaya line of the Moscow Metro, between Novatorskaya and Zyuzino. The name of the station derives from Vorontsovsky Park. The station was opened on 7 December 2021 as part of the section between Mnyovniki and Kakhovskaya.

The station is located close to Kaluzhskaya station, and interchange is in operation.
