= British International School (Moscow) =

Coordinates: 55.666855346°N 37.5725284872°E

Information
- School type: International School
- Established: 1994
- Language: English

The British International School of Moscow (BIS) is a private international school in Moscow, Russia. The school was founded in 1994 to meet the needs of expatriate or Russian parents who wished for their children to be taught in English using the English National Curriculum, as adapted to meet the needs of international pupils.

== Overview ==
The majority of students are from Russia and also from around the world. The school is split into two regions, with some schools being in the 'North' and the others in the 'South'. Some campuses are directly adjacent to, or close to, large industrial areas.

== Campuses ==
The School has 6 campuses.

BISM 1 (Infant Education-Voikovskaya region of Moscow). The Northern Infant School caters for children between the ages of 3 and 7. Its programme incorporates all subjects according to the English Curriculum Foundation Stage (Nursery/Reception classes) and Key Stage One (Years 1 & 2). The school also has a Russian language programme that begins at Year 1 and is taught by Russian teachers on three levels to accommodate native and non-native Russian students.

BISM 2 (Primary Education-Voikovskaya region of Moscow). The Northern Campus Junior School caters for children between the ages of 6 and 11. The school follows the English National Curriculum adapted to meet the needs of a mobile international community.

BISM 3 (Secondary Education-Yasenevo region of Moscow). The Southern Secondary Campus follows the National Curriculum for England. The school offers a complete educational programme for children ages 11–18. After completing Year 11, pupils can stay on to study the British A Level programme. Pupils come from currently 45 nationalities. The school has a well-equipped ICT facility, including interactive whiteboards to supplement teaching.

BISM 5 (Primary and Secondary Education Russian style, Nakhimovskiy prospekt (Profsoyuznaya) region of Moscow). The Russian curriculum school of the British International School is located in the South-West of Moscow. The school provides education in the Russian curriculum with elements of the British system, including the teaching of English by native speakers.

BISM 7 (Secondary Education – Voikovskaya region). The Northern Senior Campus in Voikovskaya offers an educational programme for children ages 11–18. After completing Year 11, pupils may stay within BISM to study the British A-level Programme either on the Northern campus or at the Southern School 3 campus.

BISM 9 (Primary Education-Nakhimovskiy prospekt, Profsouznaya region of Moscow). School 9 is located in central southwest Moscow next to the metro station "Profsoyuznaya". Students may enroll in an English Curriculum primary school (Reception, Key stages 1&2) for pupils aged 3–11.

== See also ==
- Russian Embassy School in London - Russian school in London
