= Konkovo District =

Konkovo District Коньково (Russian)
- District
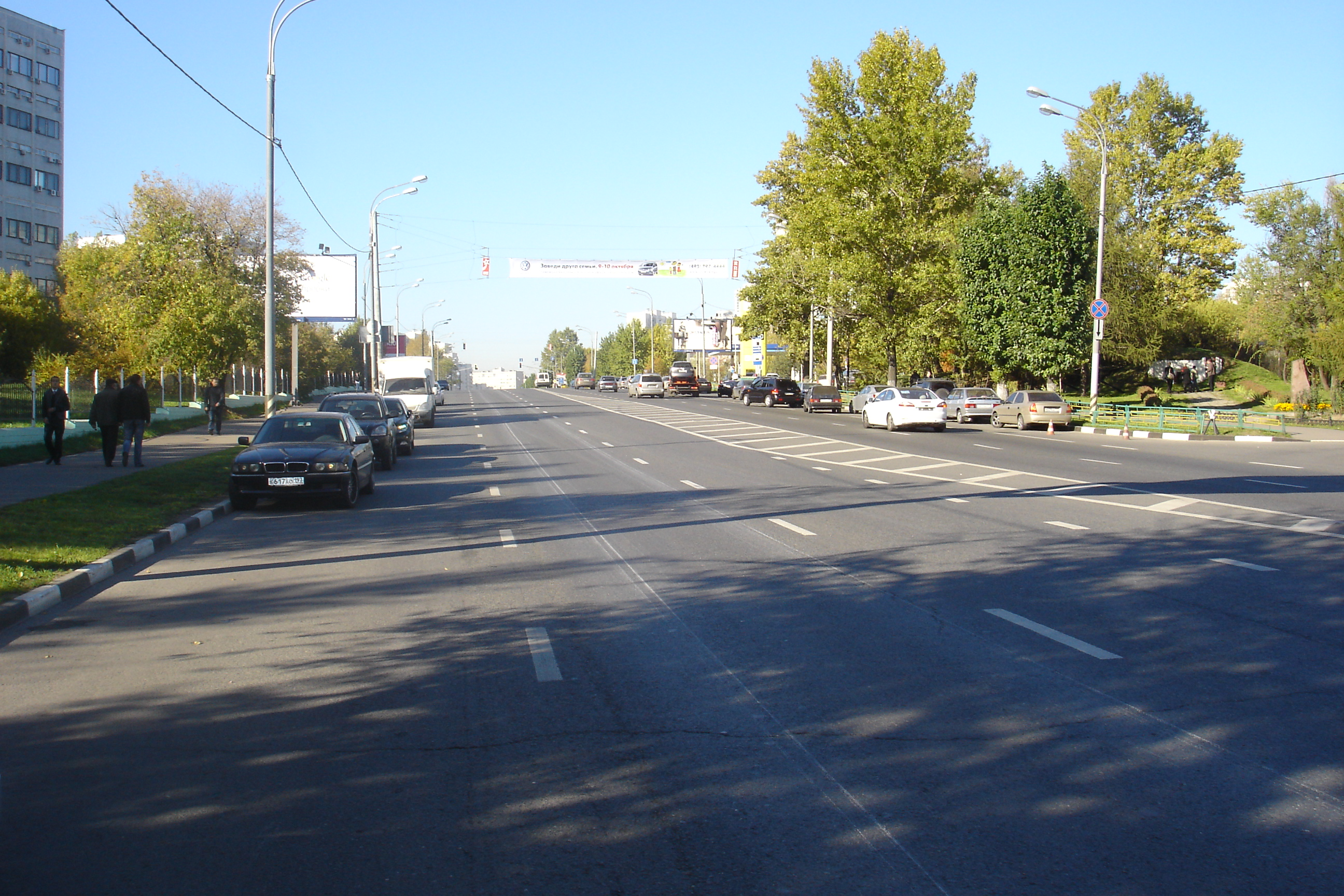
- Obrucheva street, Konkovo District

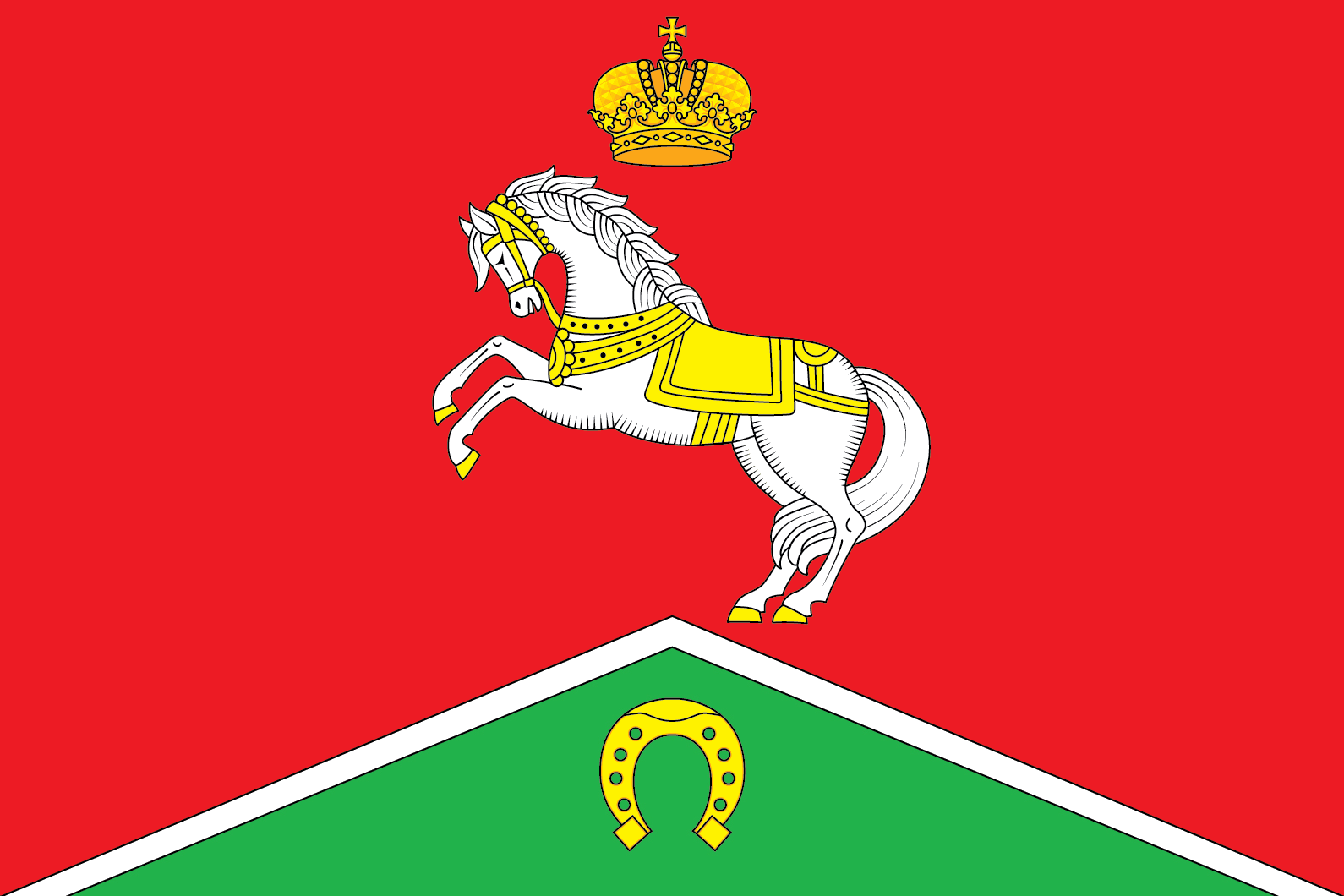
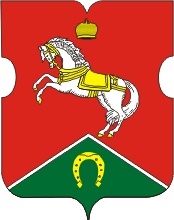
- Flag Coat of arms
- Location of Konkovo District on the map of Moscow
- Coordinates: 55°38′27″N 37°31′43″E
- Country: Russia
- Federal subject: Moscow

Area
  - Total: 7.179 km^{2} (2.772 sq mi)

Population
  - Estimate (2017): 97,847
- Time zone: UTC+
- OKTMO ID: 45902000
- Website: http://konkovo.mos.ru/

Konkovo District (Russian: Коньково) is an administrative district (raion) of South-Western Administrative Okrug, and one of the 125 raions of Moscow, Russia. The area of the district is 7.179 square kilometers (2.772 sq mi). Population: 97,847 (2017 est.).It is located in the south of the city, along the Kaluzhsko-Rizhskaya (orange) metro line.

== Territory and borders ==
The Konkovo district is located in the central part of the South-Western Administrative Okrug, bordering on the following districts of Moscow:

In the southwest - Tyoply Stan

In the south, southeast and east - Yasenevo (including the Bitsevsky Forest natural park)

In the north - Cheryomushki

In the north-west - Obruchevsky

The area consists of several microdistricts, built mainly in 1968-1986.

In the center of the district there is the Belyaevo metro station, on the borders of the district there are the Konkovo metro station and the Kaluzhskaya metro station.

== See also ==
- Administrative divisions of Moscow
