= Aero Rent =

Flight company

Aero Rent ОАО «АЭРО РЕНТ»
IATA	ICAO	Call sign
-	NRO	AEROMASTER
- Founded: 1996
- Ceased operations: 2011
- Hubs: Vnukovo International Airport
- Fleet size: 5
- Headquarters: Moscow, Russia
- Website: http://www.aerorent.ru/ENG/services/

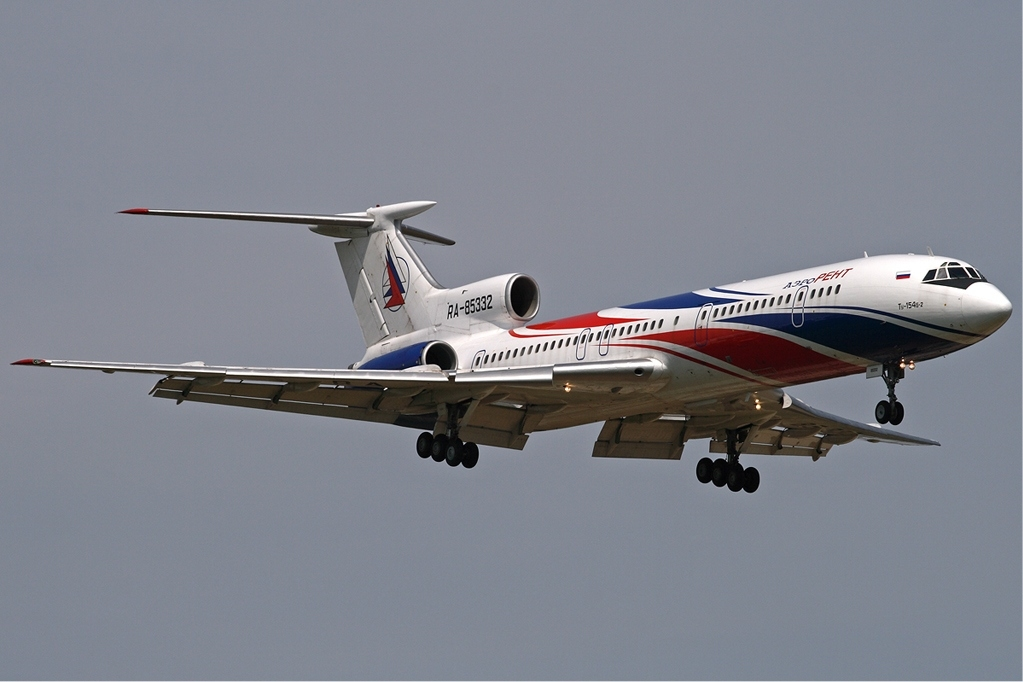
RA-85332 TU-154B-2

Aero Rent (Авиакомпания "Аэро Рент") was an airline based in Cheryomushki District, South-Western Administrative Okrug, Moscow, Russia. It operated global VIP charter flights out of Moscow Vnukovo International Airport and facilitated the chartering of aircraft from other airlines.

== History ==
The airline was registered by the Moscow Chamber of Commerce on 9 March 1995.

Airline ceased in November 2011.

== Fleet ==
As of July 8, 2012

Aircraft type	Active	Notes
Tupolev Tu-134	2	VIP Configuration, RA-65557 and RA-65919
Yakovlev Yak-40	2	VIP Configuration, RA-87334 and RA-88306
British Aerospace 125-800	1	RA-02807
