= Teplostan Upland =

Upland in Moscow, Russia

- Теплостанская возвышенность
- Location within Moscow

Highest point
- Elevation: 255 m (837 ft)
- Coordinates: 55°42′N 37°30′E

Geography
- Location: Moscow, Russia

Teplostan Upland (Russian: Теплостанская возвышенность) is an upland located in the Tyoply Stan District, in southwest Moscow, on the right bank of the Moskva. With a height of 255 m (837 ft), it is the highest point in the federal city and 130 m (430 ft) meters above the edge of the Moskva.

== See also ==
- List of highest points of Russian federal subjects
