= Yasenevo District =

Yasenevo District Ясенево (Russian)
- District
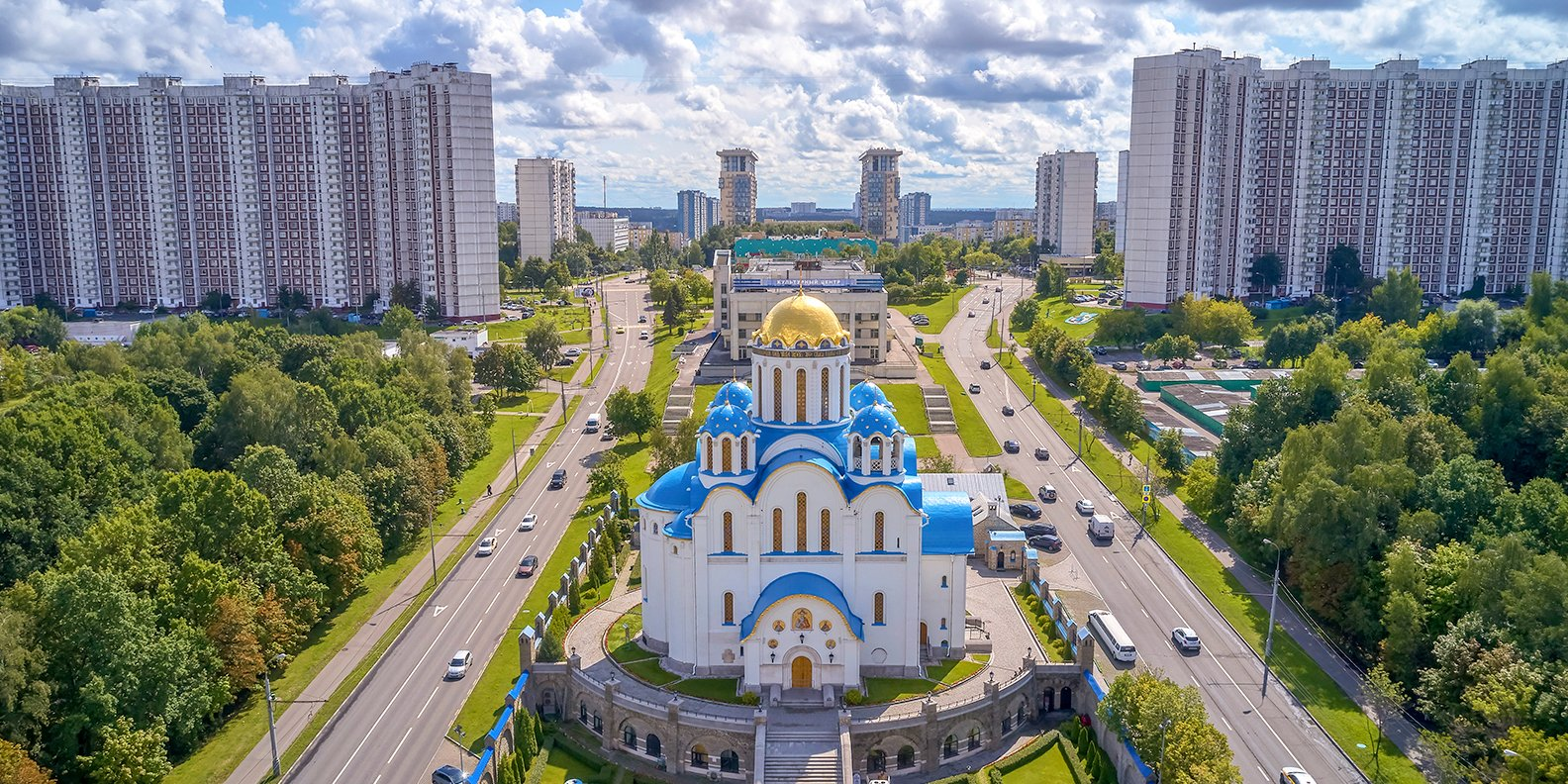

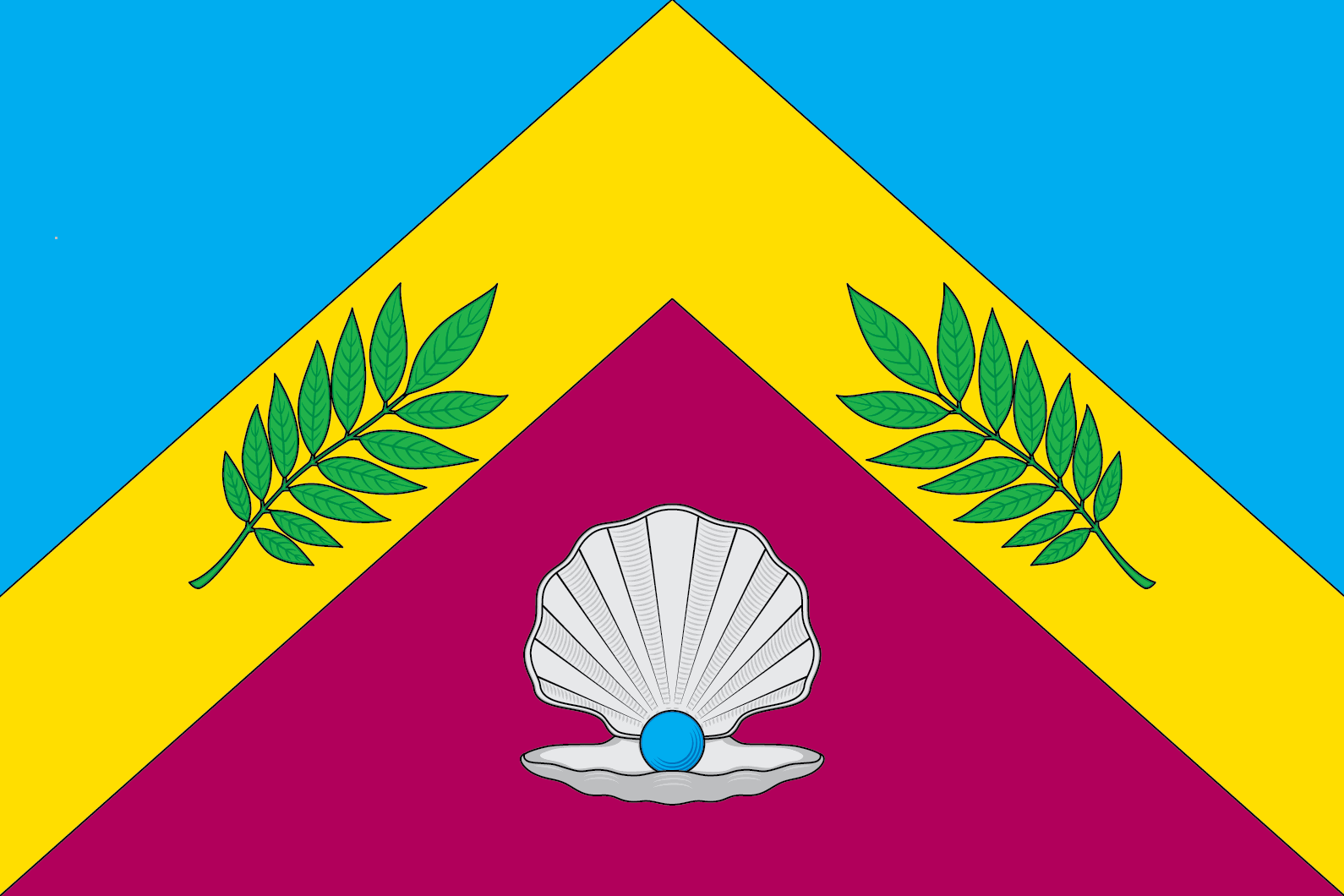
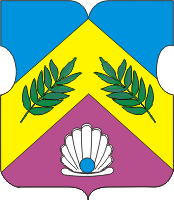
- Flag Coat of arms
- Location of Yasenevo District on the map of Moscow
- Coordinates: 55°36′27″N 37°32′04″E
- Country: Russia
- Federal subject: Moscow

Area
  - Total: 25.4 km^{2} (9.8 sq mi)

Population
  - Estimate (2016): 172,300
- Time zone: UTC+3 (MSK)
- OKTMO ID: 45910000
- Website: http://yasenevo.mos.ru/

Yasenevo District (Russian: райо́н Я́сенево) is an administrative district (raion) of South-Western Administrative Okrug, and one of the 125 raions of Moscow, Russia. The area of the district is 25.4 square kilometers (9.8 sq mi). Population: 172,300 (2017 est.).

== General ==
Yasenevo is located in the South of Moscow and is adjacent to the Moscow Ring Road. The development of the residential area started in 1976 under the leadership of Yakov Belopolsky, an architect specialising in complex development of residential districts. Yasenevo is a commuter area without major industrial sites.

The neighbouring districts are Tyoply Stan to the West, Konkovo and Zyuzino to the North, and Chertanovo to the East. To the South, the area beyond the Ring Road has never been developed; it was part of the Moscow Oblast until 2012 when it was assigned to the newly created Novomoskovsky Administrative Okrug. From all directions except the Western one, the Yasenevo residential area is surrounded by the Bitsa Park and is not directly adjacent to any other district. The Western part of Yasenevo forms a limited industrial/warehouse area.

Of the 25,4 km^{2} of Yasenevo's area, only 6,4 km^{2} are developed for residential purposes (the majority of the district's area being the Bitsa Park). Yasenevo's residential space amounts to almost 3 million square metres. As of July 2020, Yasenevo was ranked 55th among Moscow's districts in terms of average housing prices.

Yasenevo is one of the ecologically cleanest areas of Moscow.

The highest point of Moscow is located in Yasenevo close to the Tyoply Stan metro station, at 255.2 metres above sea level.

Up to the fall of the Soviet Union, KGB insiders called the KGB headquarters located in Yasenevo "the Russian Langley." In the English-speaking world, Yasenevo is known for hosting the headquarters of Russia's Foreign Intelligence Service (SVR).

== Education ==
Yasenevo is the location of school 3 and 4 of the British International School, Moscow.

== See also ==
- Administrative divisions of Moscow
