= Konkovo (Moscow Metro) =

Moscow Metro station

Konkovo Коньково
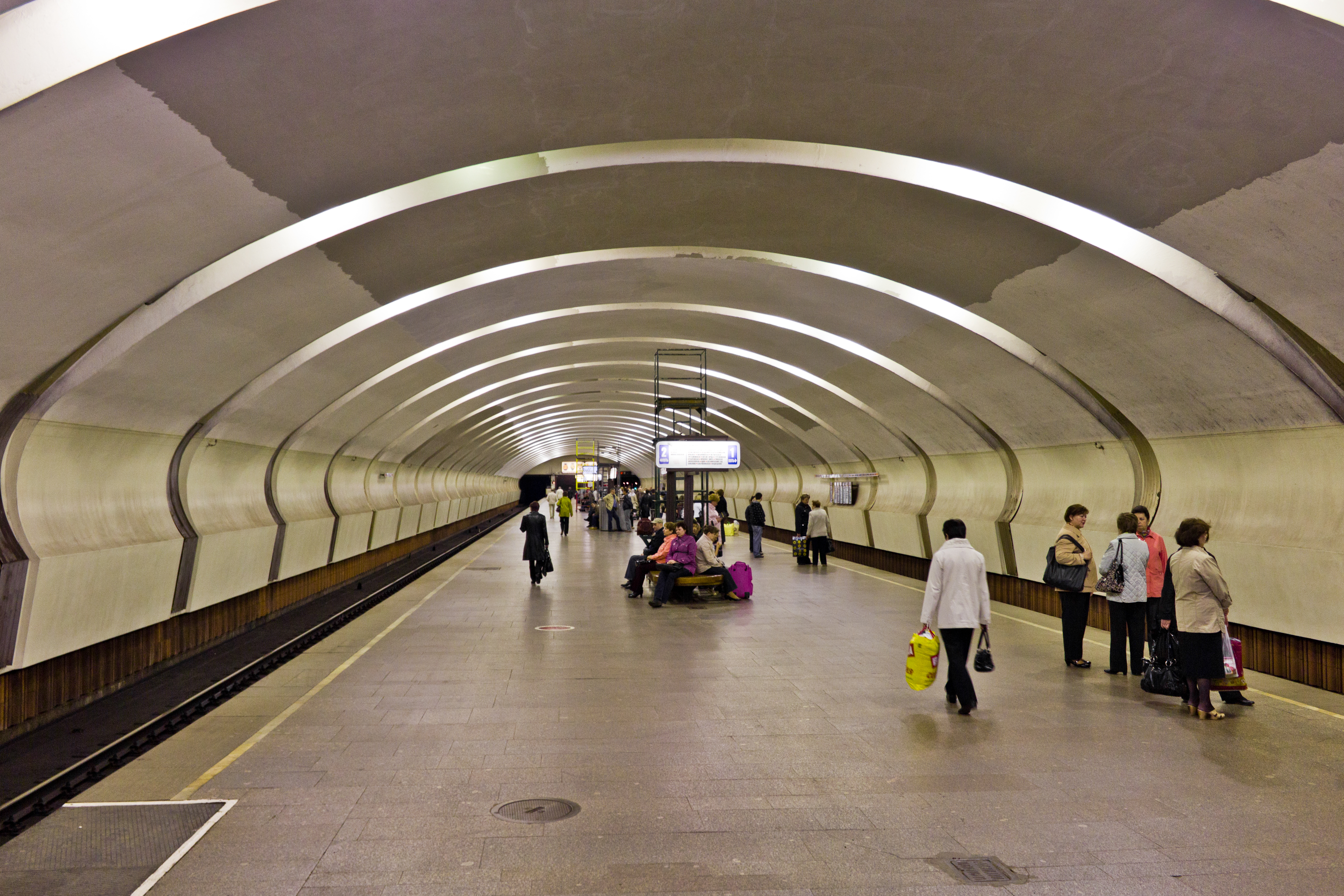

General information
- Location: Konkovo District; Tyoply Stan District; South-Western Administrative Okrug; Moscow; Russia
- Coordinates: 55.6333°N 37.5188°E
- System: Moscow Metro station
- Owner: Moskovsky Metropoliten
- Line: Kaluzhsko-Rizhskaya line
- Platforms: 1
- Tracks: 2
- Connections: Bus: 2S, 49, 145, 196, 235, 250, 295, 699, 712, 754; Trolleybus: 72, 81

Construction
- Depth: 8 metres (26 ft)
- Platform levels: 1
- Parking: No

Other information
- Station code: 106

History
- Opened: 6 November 1987; 38 years ago

Passengers
- 2002: 16,936,000

Services
Preceding station	Moscow Metro	Following station
Tyoply Stan towards Novoyasenevskaya	Kaluzhsko-Rizhskaya line	Belyayevo towards Medvedkovo
Route map
Location
- Location within Moscow Metro

Konkovo (Russian: Конько́во) is a station on the Kaluzhsko-Rizhskaya Line of the Moscow Metro.

== Design ==
It was designed by N. Shumakov, G. Mun, and N. Shurygina and opened on 6 November 1987 with the southward extension of the line. The station is of a single vault design, the only one on the radius. Its cross-section is meant to resemble two rows of sickles with the blades pointing inward, a design feature enhanced by the recessed light fixtures and metal accent strips in the spaces between the plaster ceiling panels. The bases of the vault is strongly recessed and faced with reddish ceramic tile.

The entrances to Konkovo are located at the intersection of Profsoyuznaya and Ostrovityanov streets.

== Traffic ==
Its daily passenger traffic is 46,400 passengers.
