= Tyoply Stan (Moscow Metro) =

Moscow Metro station

Tyoply Stan Тёплый Стан
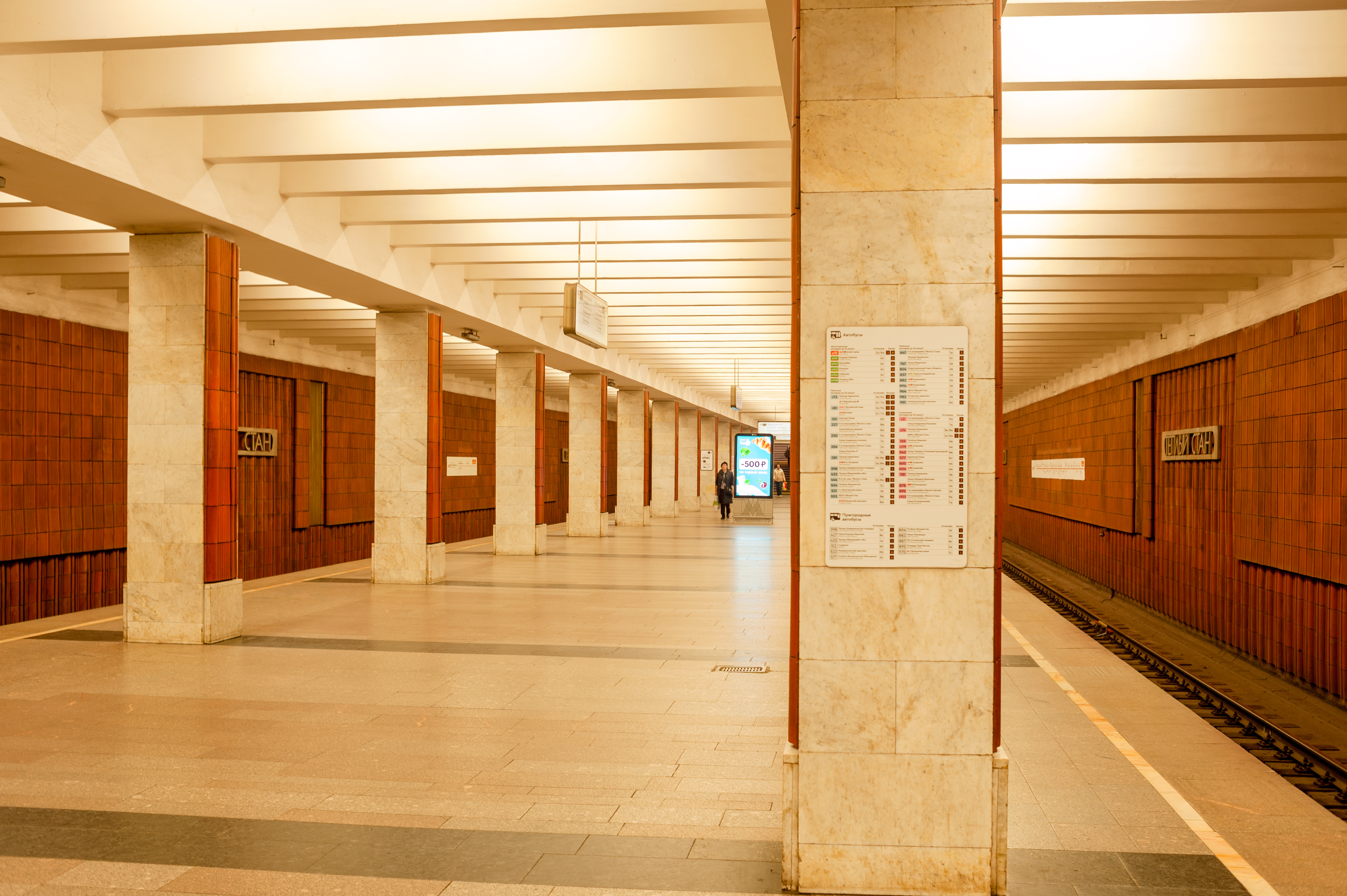

General information
- Location: Tyoply Stan District; Yasenevo District; South-Western Administrative Okrug; Moscow; Russia
- Coordinates: 55.6191°N 37.5082°E
- System: Moscow Metro station
- Owner: Moskovsky Metropoliten
- Line: Kaluzhsko-Rizhskaya line
- Platforms: 1
- Tracks: 2
- Connections: Bus: 2S, 37, 37e, 144, 227, 235, 250, 264, 281, 398, 427, 433, 508, 512, 515, 526, 531, 577, 600, 647, 767, 781, 804, 895; Trolleybus: 72, 81

Construction
- Depth: 8 metres (26 ft)
- Platform levels: 1
- Parking: No

Other information
- Station code: 107

History
- Opened: 6 November 1987; 38 years ago

Passengers
- 2002: 26,791,000

Services
Preceding station	Moscow Metro	Following station
Yasenevo towards Novoyasenevskaya	Kaluzhsko-Rizhskaya line	Konkovo towards Medvedkovo
Route map
Location
- Location within Moscow Metro

Tyoply Stan (Russian: Тёплый Стан) is a station near the southern end of the Moscow Metro's Kaluzhsko-Rizhskaya Line.

== Design ==
It was built to column tri-span design and opened on 6 November 1987 and was a temporary terminus of the line. (Remains of a piston junction can still be seen near the station.) Because of the extreme radius where Kaluzhskiy turns by a nearly right angle, Tyoply Stan, unlike the previous seven stations of the line, is located at an angle to Profsoyuznaya Street. Both the walls and the transverse faces of the pillars are faced with brightly coloured red ceramic tiles.

The metro sports brightly-colored red ceramic tiles on the walls.

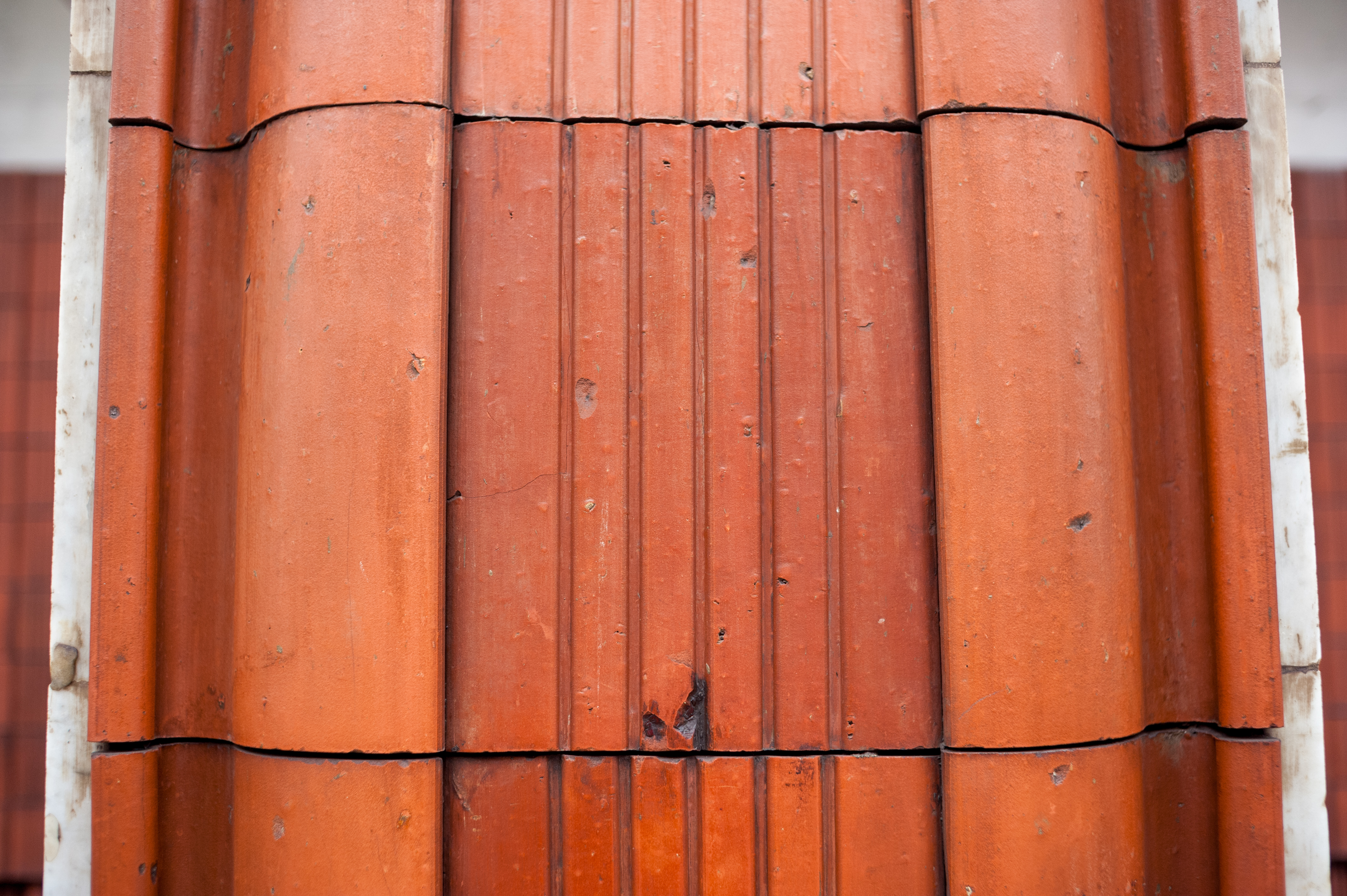
Red ceramic tile

Grey marble was employed for the longitudinal faces of the pillars. The architects of Tyoply Stan were N. Shumakov, G. Mun, and N. Shurygina.

The entrances to the station are located at the intersection of Profsoyuznaya Street and Novoyasenevsky Avenue.

== Traffic ==
The station's daily traffic is 73,400 passengers.
