= Novye Cheryomushki (Moscow Metro) =

Moscow Metro station

Novye Cheryomushki Новые Черёмушки
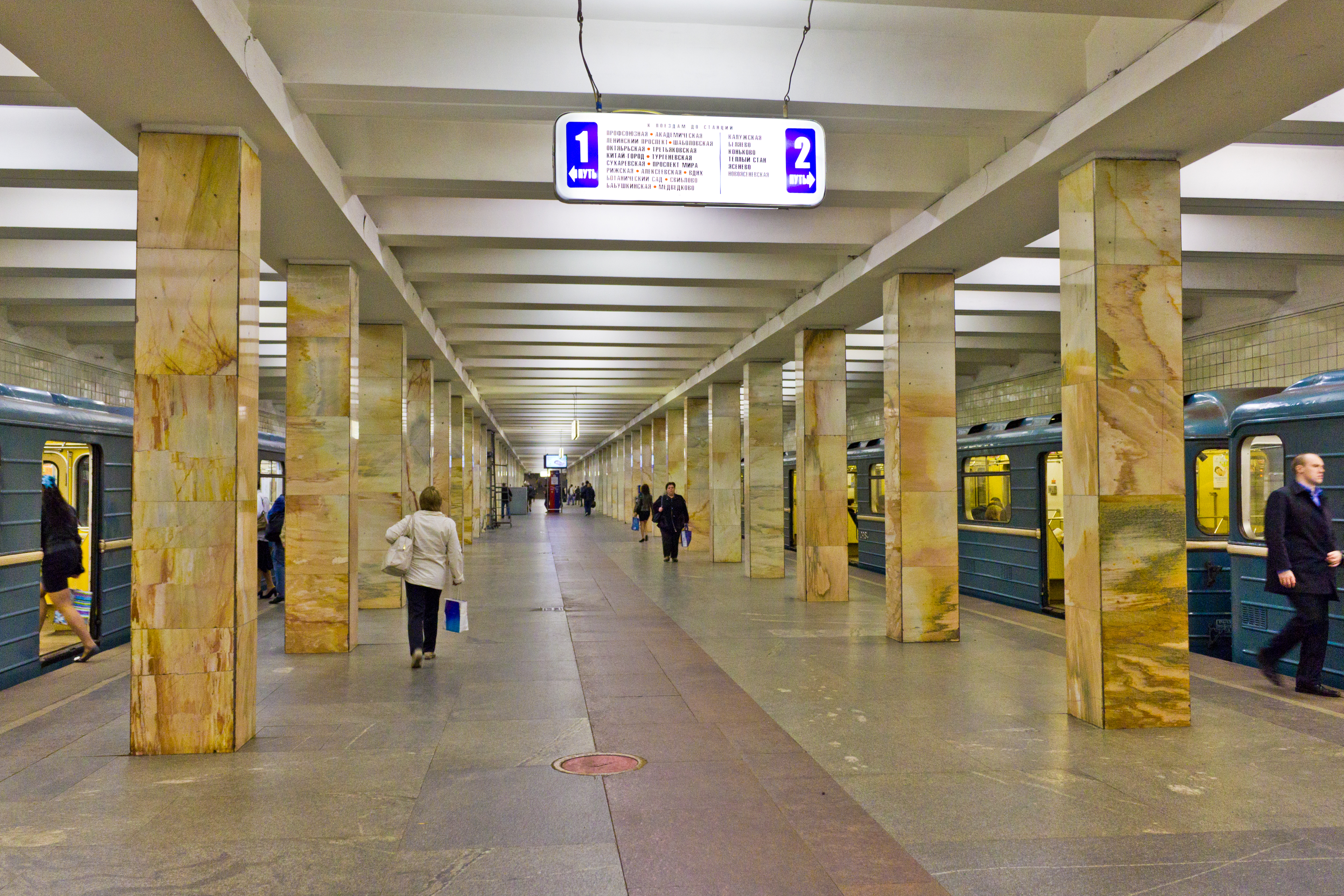

General information
- Location: Cheryomushki District; Obruchevsky District; South-Western Administrative Okrug; Moscow; Russia
- Coordinates: 55.6702°N 37.5544°E
- System: Moscow Metro station
- Owner: Moskovsky Metropoliten
- Line: Kaluzhsko-Rizhskaya line
- Platforms: 1
- Tracks: 2
- Connections: Bus: 1, C5, T60, 103, 113, 153, 172, 246, 288, 616, 648, 993

Construction
- Depth: 7 metres (23 ft)
- Platform levels: 1
- Parking: No

Other information
- Station code: 103

History
- Opened: 13 October 1962; 63 years ago

Passengers
- 2002: 19,272,000

Services
Preceding station	Moscow Metro	Following station
Kaluzhskaya towards Novoyasenevskaya	Kaluzhsko-Rizhskaya line	Profsoyuznaya towards Medvedkovo
Route map
Location
- Location within Moscow Metro

Novye Cheryomushki (Russian: Новые Черёмушки. English: New Cheryomushki) is a train station on the Kaluzhsko-Rizhskaya Line of the Moscow Metro. It was opened as the final segment of the Kaluzhskiy radius on 13 October 1962, and served as a terminus for two years.

== Design ==
Novye Cheryomushki was built to the standard column tri-span design and features pillars faced with pinkish marble and tiled walls accented with two horizontal stripes of reddish-brown tile. The architects were M. Markovskiy and A. Ryzhkov.

The entrances to the station are located on Profsoyuznaya Street at its intersection with Garibaldi Street.

== Traffic ==
The station has a daily passenger traffic of 52,800 people.

== Gallery ==
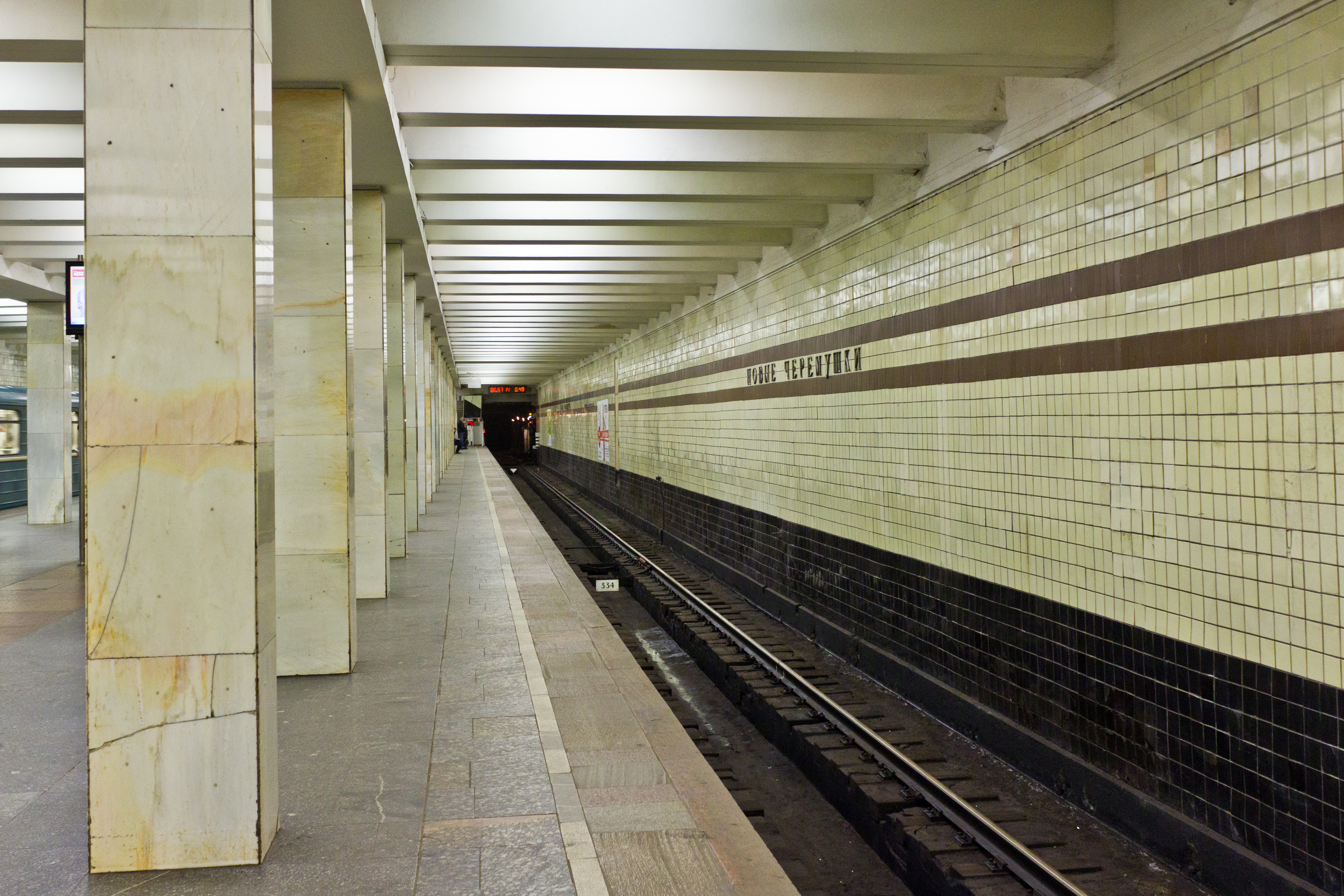
Platform view
