= Josip Broz Tito Square =

Square in Moscow, Russia

Coordinates: 55°40′41″N 37°33′48″E

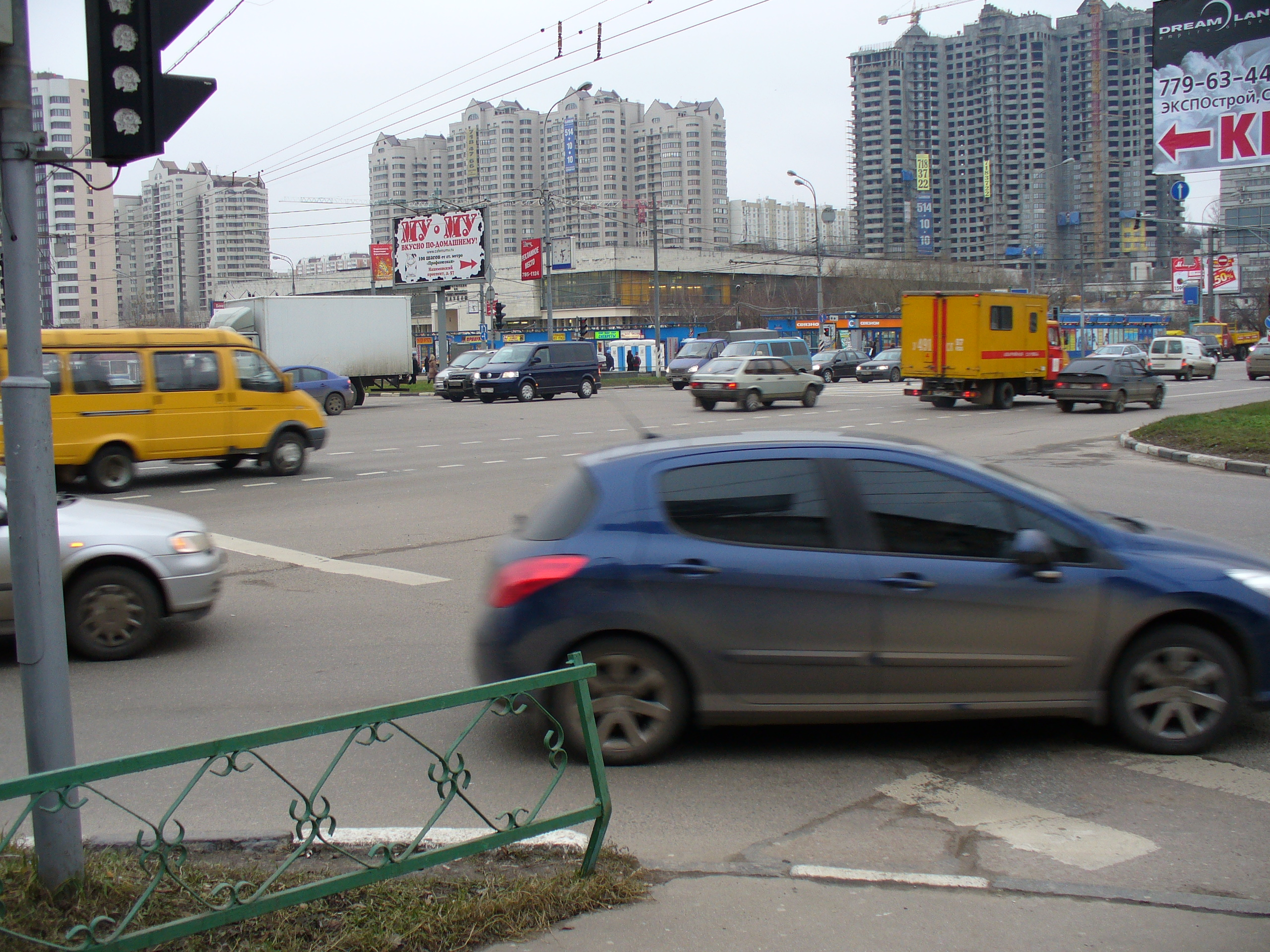
Josip Broz Tito Square

Josip Broz Tito Square (Russian: Площадь Иосипа Броз Тито) is a square in Moscow, close to the Profsoyuznaya metro station.

The square was named after the Yugoslav Communist leader Josip Broz Tito in 1981, one year after his death.
