= Cheryomushki District =

Cheryomushki District Черёмушки (Russian)
- District
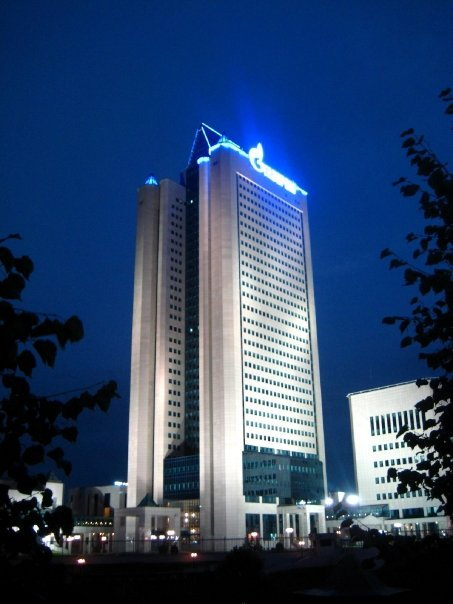
- Gazprom head office

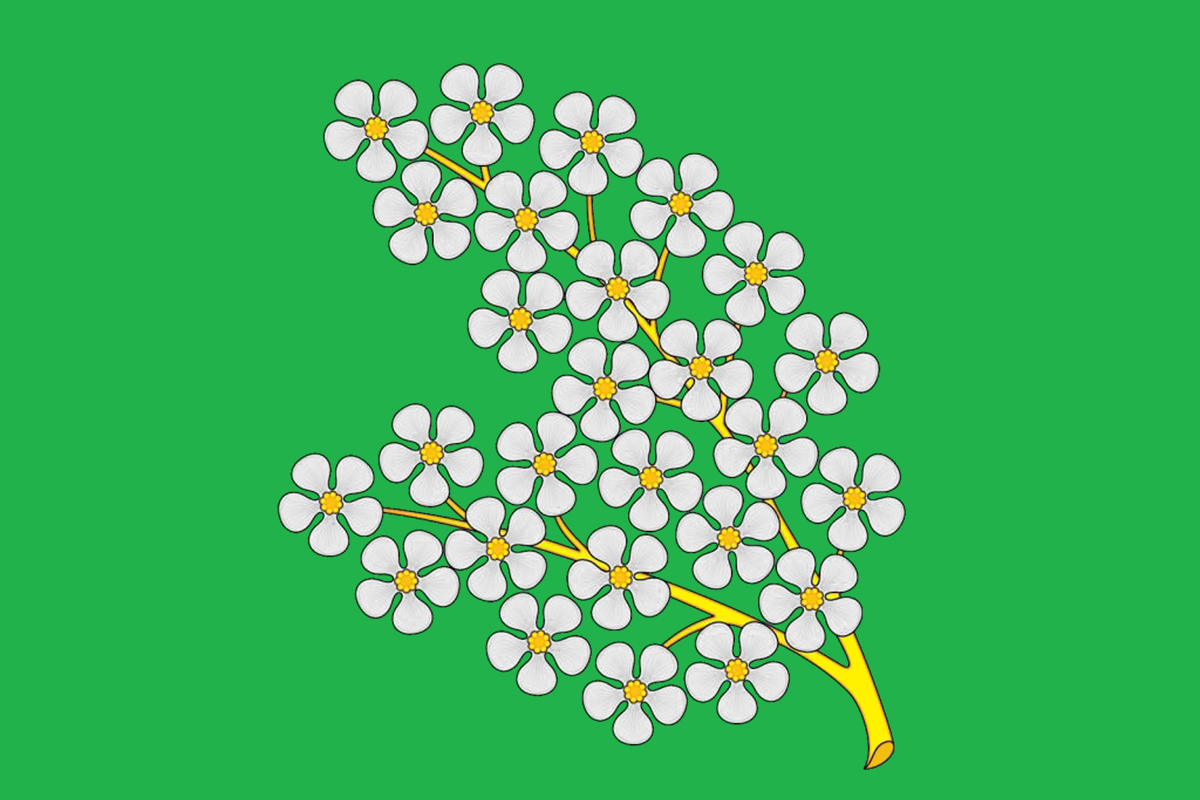
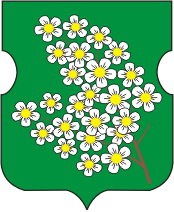
- Flag Coat of arms
- Location of Cheryomushki District on the map of Moscow
- Coordinates: 55°39′53″N 37°33′38″E
- Country: Russia
- Federal subject: Moscow
- Time zone: UTC+
- OKTMO ID: 45908000
- Website: http://cheremush.mos.ru/

Cheryomushki District (Russian: райо́н Черёмушки, derived from "черёмуха", meaning "bird cherry tree"), formerly Brezhnevsky District, is a district of South-Western Administrative Okrug of the federal city of Moscow, Russia. Population: 102,619 (2010 census); 89,264 (2002 census).

The district is delimited by Nakhimovsky Prospekt avenue (north), Obrucheva Street (south), Sevastopolsky Avenue (east), Profsoyuznaya Street, and Architect Vlasov Street (west). The district is mostly residential, with an industrial area near Kaluzhskaya metro station. It houses the old Gazprom headquarters.

== History ==
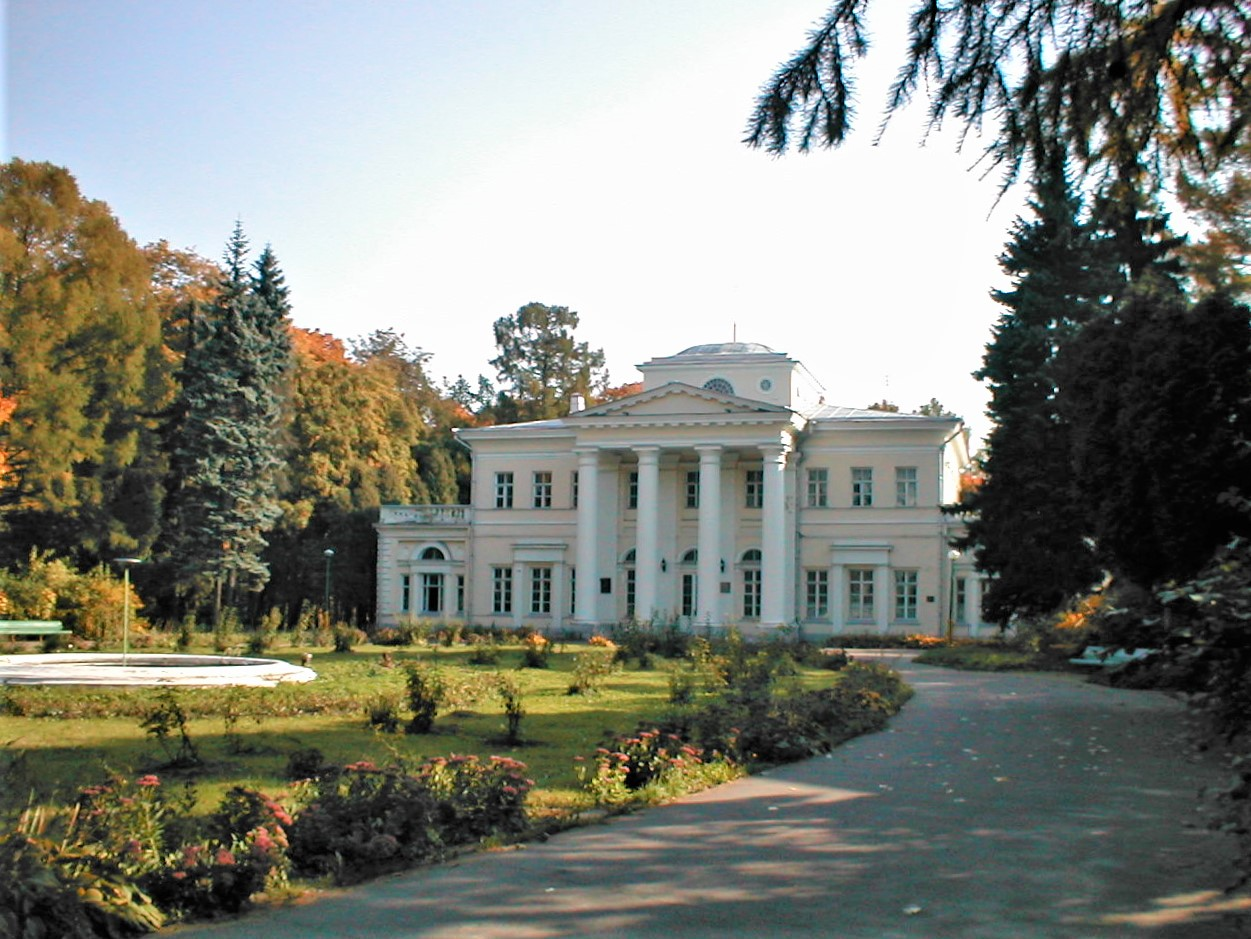
Count Menshikov's manor in Cheryomushki-Znamenskoye

Originally there was a village of Cheryomushki in Moscow suburbs southwest of Moscow which gave name to the Cheryomushki-Znamenskoye manor, which changed the ownership several times. In 1938 the village of Cheryomushki was transformed into the workers' settlement. In 1958 it was incorporated into Moscow. Soon the northern side of the district became a site of a massive, cheap housing construction khrushchyovka-type buildings. As the area gradually started moving from its historical location, the newer neighborhood has become known as "Novye Cheryomushki" ("New Cheryomushki") and a whole microdistrict, known as the Ninth Quarter of Novye Cheryomushki, was formed. "Cheryomushki" became a common name for such housing projects in various locations in Russia. The microdistrict gave the name to Novye Cheryomushki metro station. At that time, in 1959, an operetta Moscow, Cheryomushki was written by Dmitri Shostakovich satirizing the housing shortages which had led to such housing projects.

The Soviet-era buildings in this area were torn down in the 1990s-2000s and replaced with high-rises, also of standardized prefabricated concrete.

Following the death of leader Leonid Brezhnev, the district was renamed Brezhnevsky District (Брежневский район) in his honour. In 1989 the name was changed back to Cheryomushki.

In the early 1980s, the government built a number of better quality, brickwork apartment buildings that acquired a reputation of, by local standards, elite housing, and called Tsarskoye Selo (Царское село, Royal village). In the 1990s, it served as a nucleus of a massive new housing construction project between Garibaldi Street and Gazprom tower.

== Politics ==
The head of the local government, Sergey Burkotov, was shot dead in February 2007, in what appears to have been an assassination.

== Public transportation ==
The western side of the district is accessible by the Kaluzhsko-Rizhskaya Line of the Moscow Metro (stations Profsoyuznaya to Kaluzhskaya). The eastern side is also accessible through the Serpukhovsko-Timiryazevskaya Line (Sevastopolskaya, Nakhimovsky Prospekt).

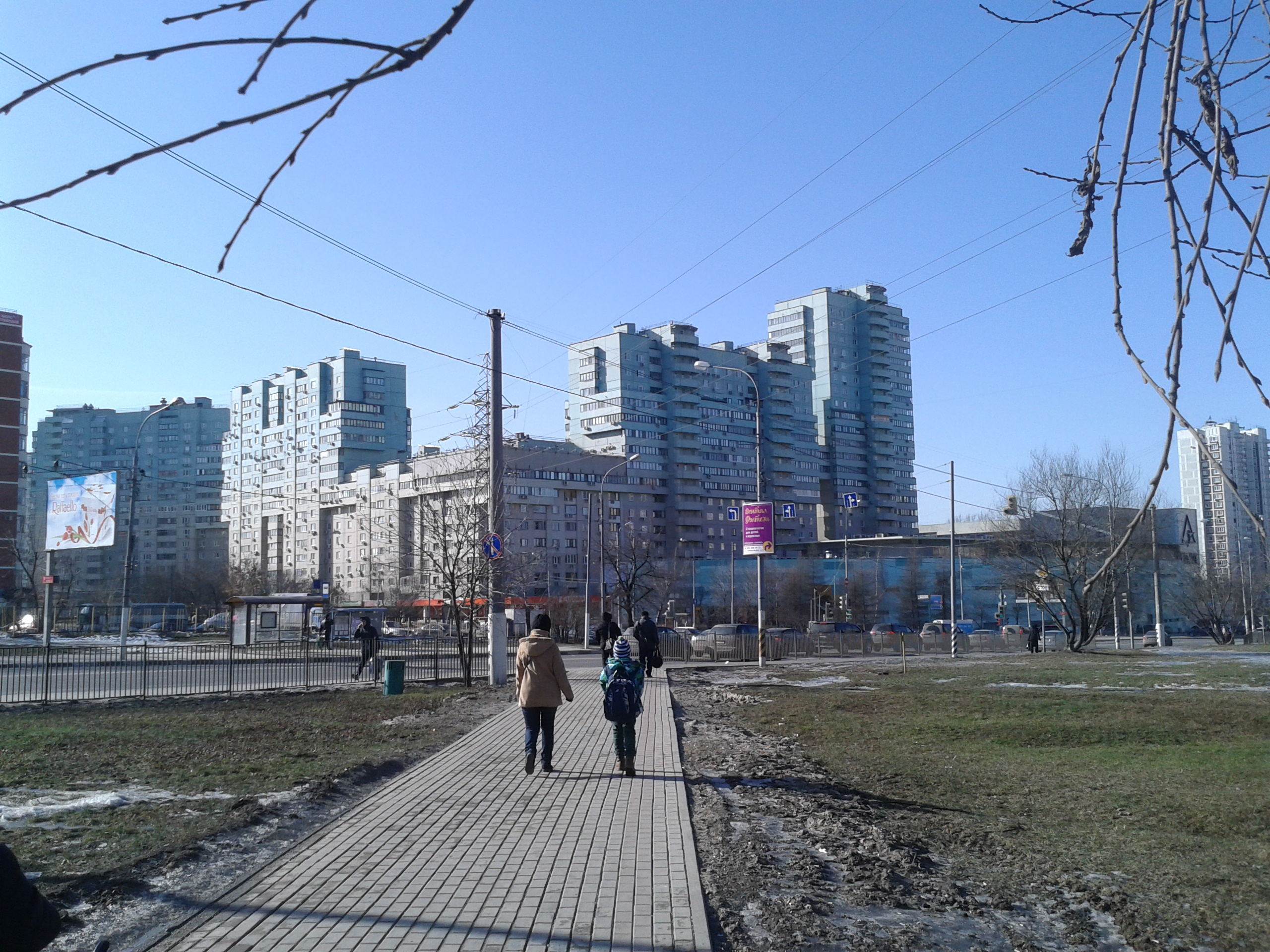
Garibaldi Street

== Economy ==
Gazprom has its head office in the district. The airline Aero Rent has its head office in the district.

== In popular culture ==
The Cheryomushki district was immortalized by Shostakovich in his immensely popular operetta Moscow, Cheryomushki. In the operetta, the cheap housing in the district is portrayed ironically as a 'dream come true' for Muscovites who had lost their houses in other, more traditional, parts of Moscow. The operetta satirizes the corruption and bureaucracy of the Soviet state through hilariously observed caricatures.

Cheryomushki is also prominently mentioned in the popular film The Irony of Fate, which is traditionally shown on New Year's Eve in Russia and other states of the former USSR. The key subplot of the film is the drab uniformity of Brezhnev era public architecture.
