= Zyuzino (Moscow Metro) =

Prospective Moscow Metro station

Zyuzino Зюзино
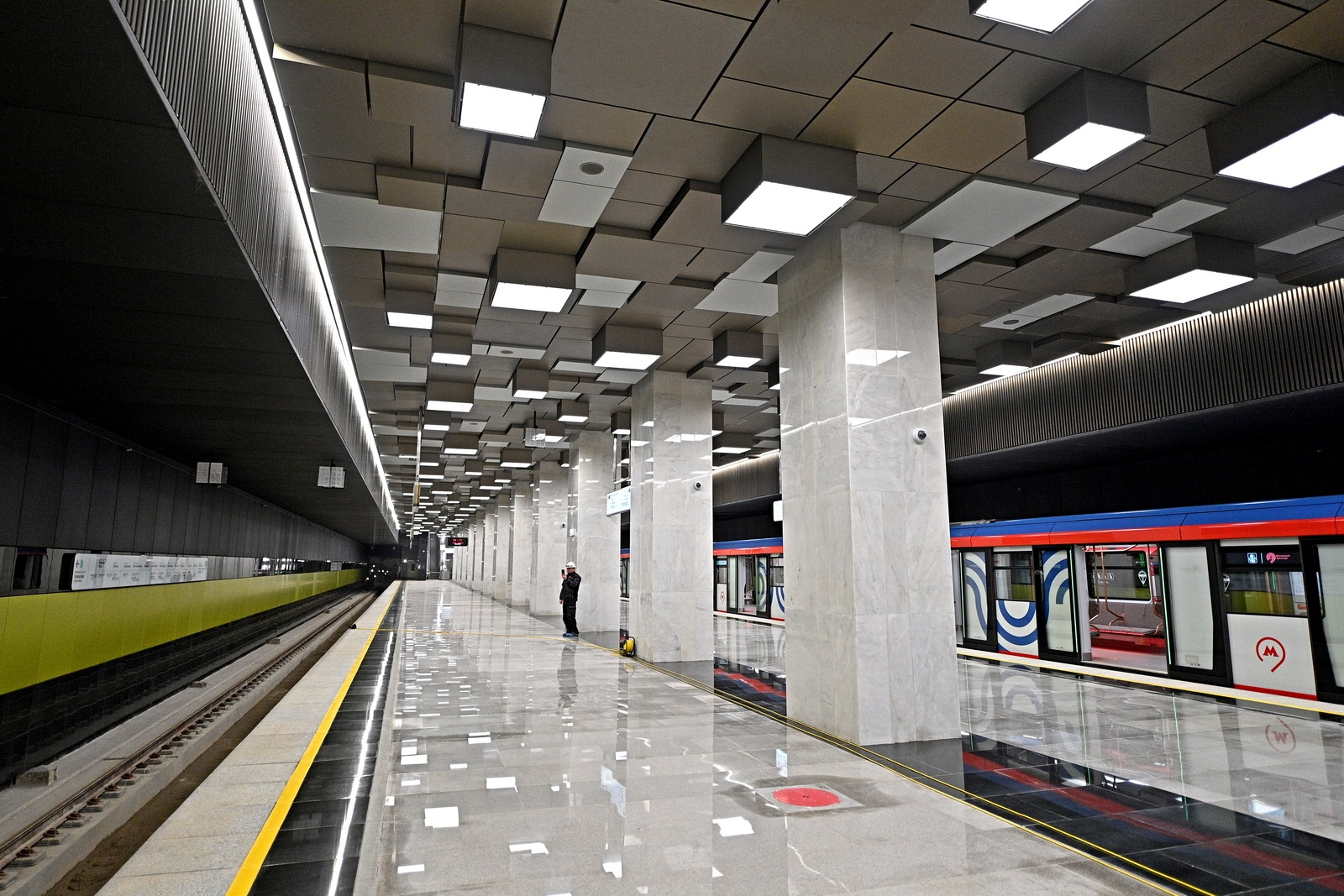

General information
- Location: Moscow; Russia
- Coordinates: 55.656712°N 37.571869°E
- System: Moscow Metro station
- Owner: Moskovsky Metropoliten
- Line: Bolshaya Koltsevaya line
- Platforms: 1 island platform

History
- Opened: 7 December 2021; 4 years ago

Services
Preceding station	Moscow Metro	Following station
Kakhovskaya anticlockwise / outer	Bolshaya Koltsevaya line	Vorontsovskaya clockwise / inner
Route map
Bolshaya Koltsevaya line
Location
- Location within Moscow Metro

Zyuzino (Russian: Зюзино) is a Moscow Metro station of the Bolshaya Koltsevaya line. It was opened on 7 December 2021 as part of the section between Mnyovniki and Kakhovskaya.

== Gallery ==
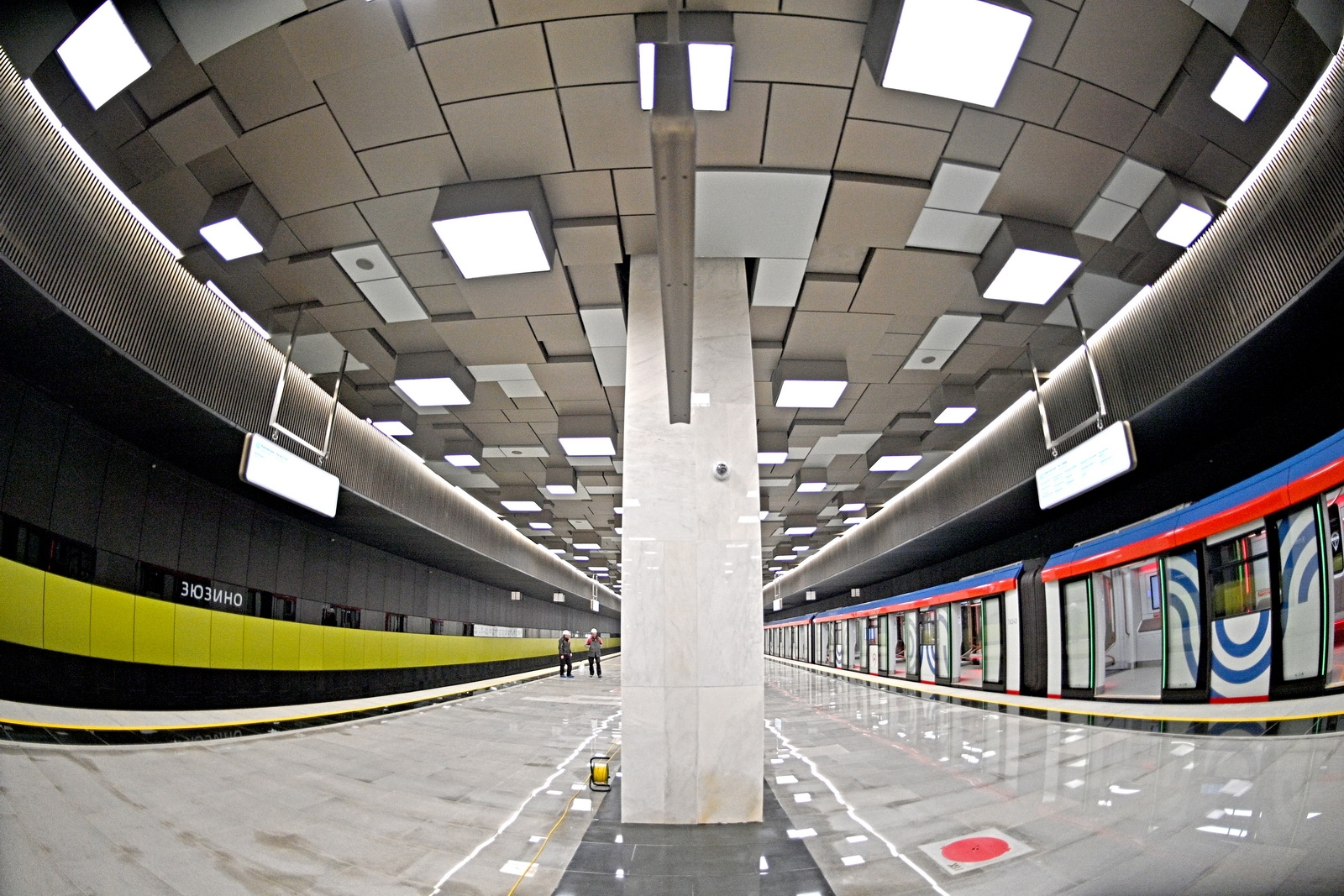
Central view of hall

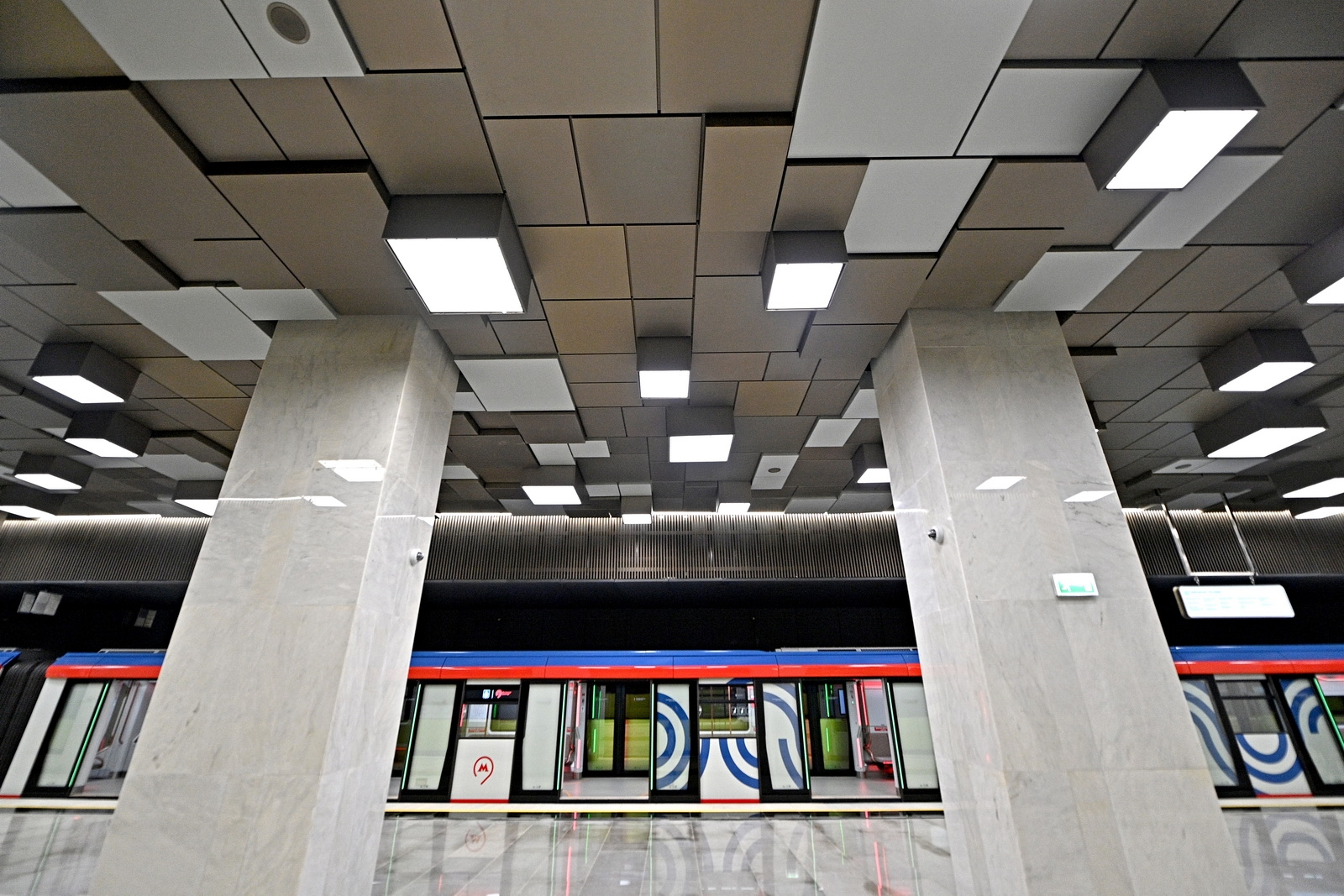
Side view of columns

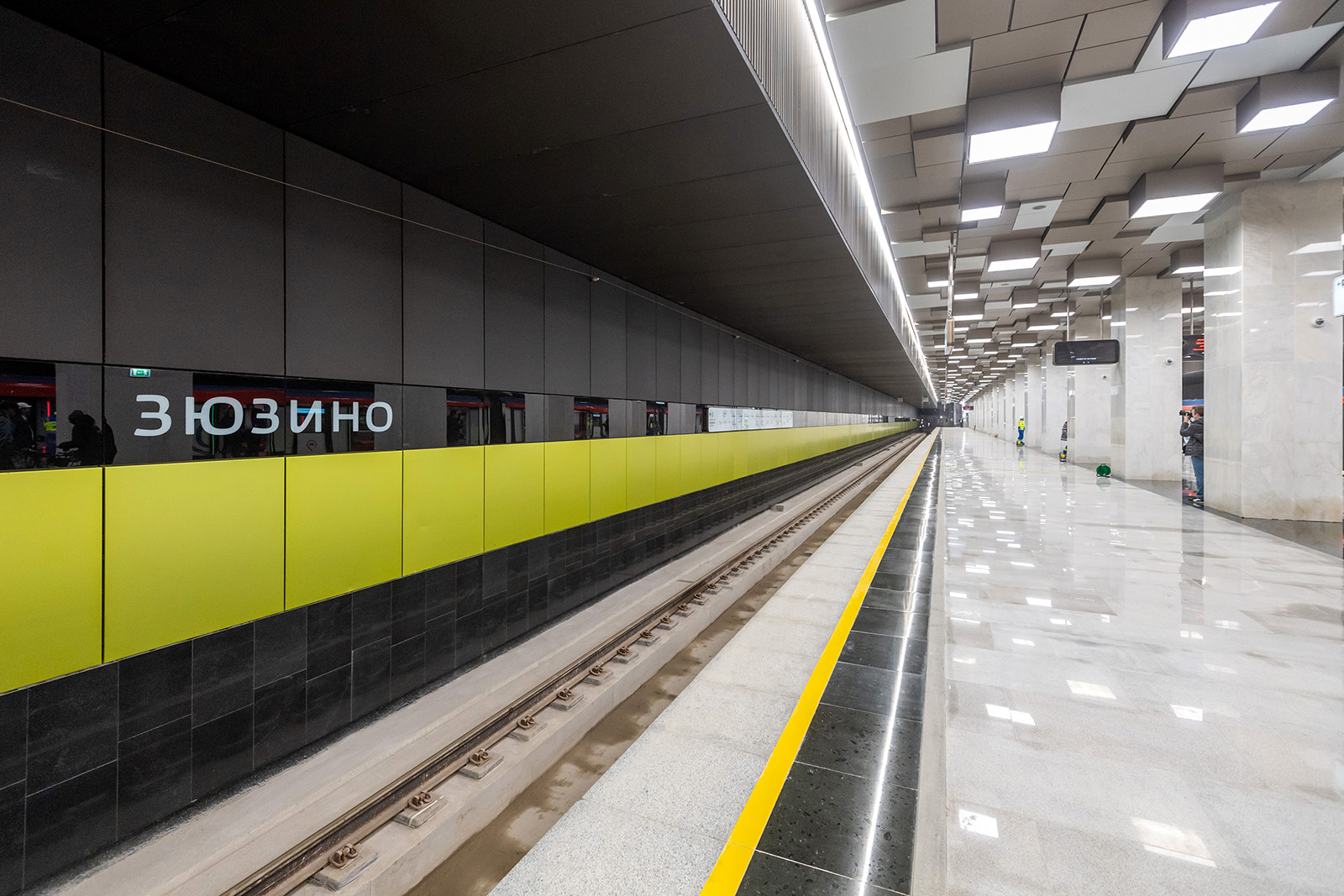
Track and side wall
