= Belyayevo (Moscow Metro) =

Moscow Metro station

Belyayevo Беляево
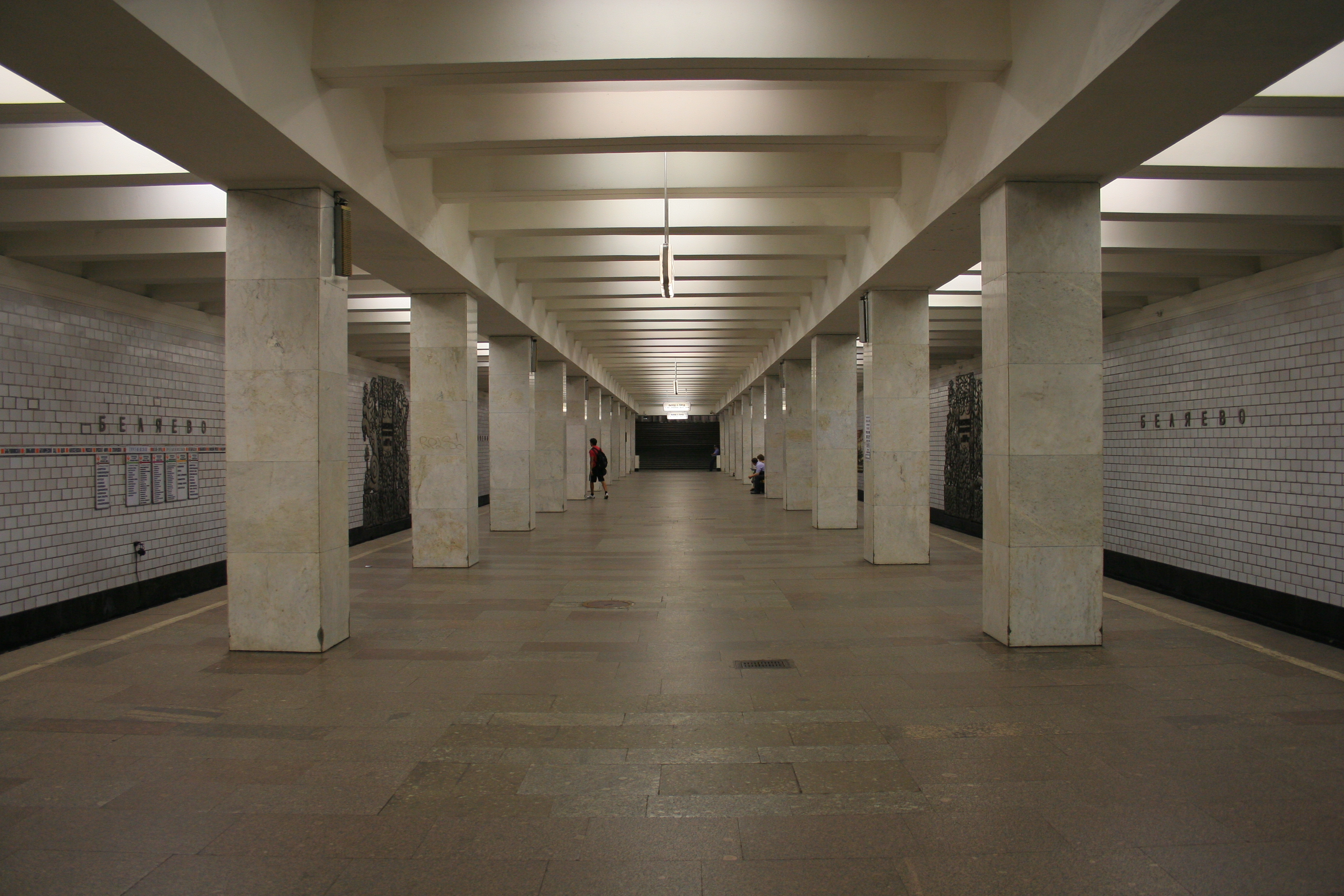

General information
- Location: Konkovo District; South-Western Administrative Okrug; Moscow; Russia
- Coordinates: 55.6428°N 37.5257°E
- System: Moscow Metro station
- Owner: Moskovsky Metropoliten
- Line: Kaluzhsko-Rizhskaya line
- Platforms: 1
- Tracks: 2
- Connections: Bus: 2S, 49, 145, 196, 235, 258, 261, 295, 639, 699, 712, 752, 754, 816; Trolleybus: 72, 81

Construction
- Depth: 12 metres (39 ft)
- Platform levels: 1
- Parking: No

Other information
- Station code: 105

History
- Opened: 12 August 1974; 52 years ago

Passengers
- 2002: 21,827,000

Services
Preceding station	Moscow Metro	Following station
Konkovo towards Novoyasenevskaya	Kaluzhsko-Rizhskaya line	Kaluzhskaya towards Medvedkovo
Route map
Location
- Location within Moscow Metro

Belyayevo (Russian: Беля́ево) is a station on the Kaluzhsko-Rizhskaya Line of the Moscow Metro. It opened on 12 August 1974 as part of the southwest extension of the Kaluzhsky radius.

== Design ==
It was designed by V. Polikarpova, V. Klokov, and L. Popov. The station was built on a modified version of the standard column tri-span design, with white marble columns and tiled walls decorated with metal panels depicting various folktales (artists by J. Bodniek and Kh. Rysin); the floor is revetted with grey granite.

Belyayevo has two underground vestibules, both of which are connected to pedestrian subways beneath Profsoyuznaya Street at its intersection with Miklukho-Maklay Street on Martin Luther King Square.

== Location ==
As between 1974 and up to 1987 the station was a terminus of the Kaluzhsko-Rizhskaya Line, behind the station there are a set of reversal sidings used for nighttime stands.

== Traffic ==
The daily passenger traffic is 59,800 people.

== Gallery ==
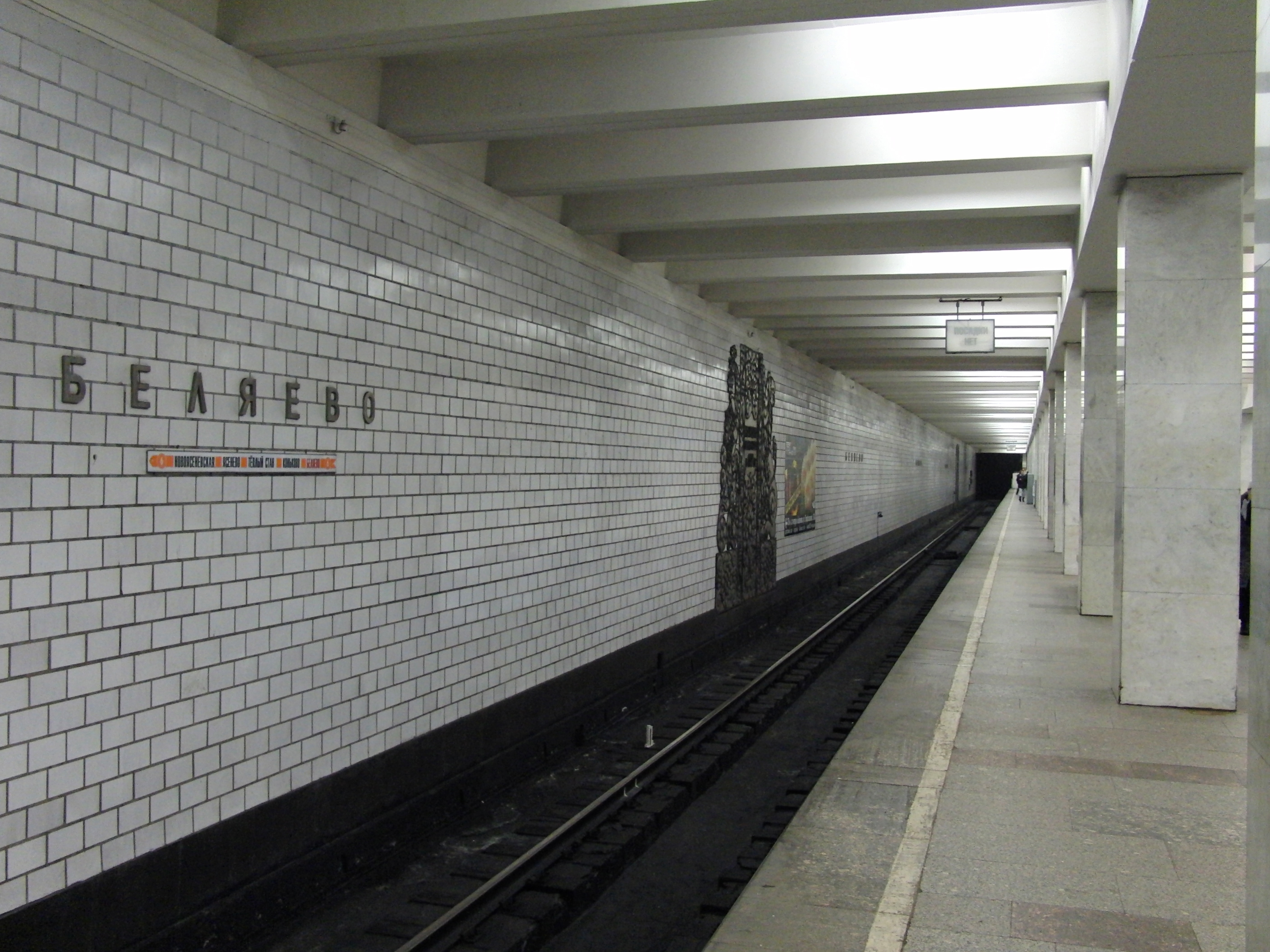
Belyalevo platform
