= Nakhimovsky (rural locality) =

Nakhimovsky (Russian: Нахимовский; masculine), Nakhimovskaya (Нахимовская; feminine), or Nakhimovskoye (Нахимовское; neuter) is the name of several rural localities in Russia:

- Nakhimovskoye, Leningrad Oblast, a settlement under the administrative jurisdiction of Roshchinskoye Settlement Municipal Formation in Vyborgsky District of Leningrad Oblast; 60°24′N 29°31′E
- Nakhimovskoye, Smolensk Oblast, a selo in Nakhimovskoye Rural Settlement of Kholm-Zhirkovsky District in Smolensk Oblast
