= Nakhimovsky Prospekt =

Avenue in Moscow, Russia

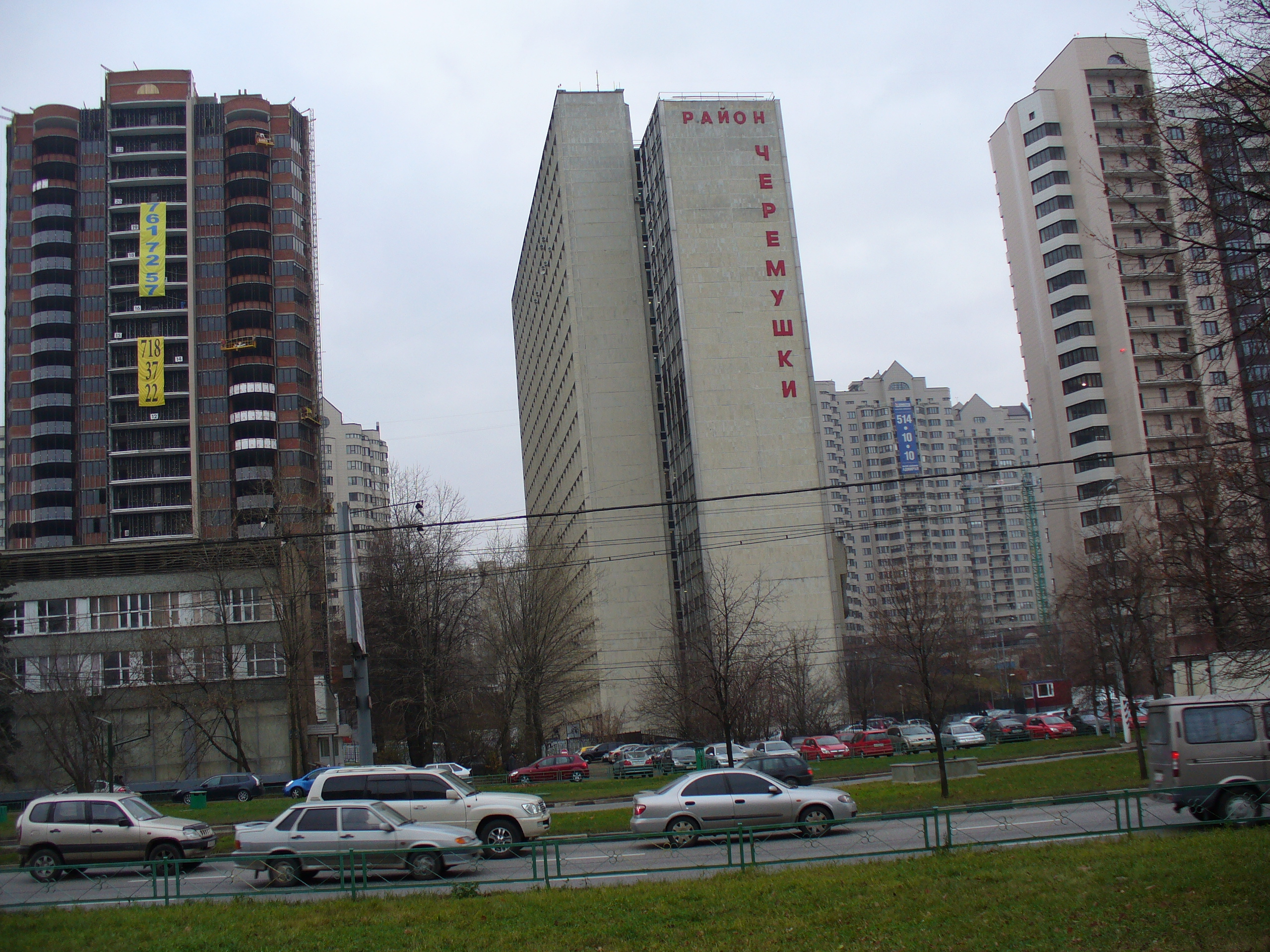
- Residential buildings
- Native name: Нахимовский проспект (Russian)
- Length: 5.1 km (3.2 mi)
- Location: Moscow, Russia; South-Western Administrative Okrug; Southern Administrative Okrug
- Postal code: 117556 (№ 1-5), 117638 (№ 7-21, 2-6), 117186 (10-22), 117209 (№ 23-29), 117218 (№ 24-42), 117418 (№ 31-51/21), 117335 (№ 55-73), 117292 (№ 46-56)
- Nearest metro station: Profsoyuznaya; Nakhimovsky Prospekt

Nakhimovsky Prospekt is an avenue in Moscow, Russia, that runs from Kolomensky Proyezd in the east to Vavilova Street in the west. After that, it continues as Lomonosovsky Prospekt.

The street first emerged around 1955 as 7th Cheryomushki Street (Седьмая Черёмушкинская улица), before being named after Admiral Pavel Nakhimov in 1965.

As part of the cancelled Fourth Ring Road (ru), Nakhimovsky Prospekt is a busy chord connecting radial streets, with major crossings like Varshavskoye Highway and Profsoyuznaya Street.

The avenue is serviced by two metro stations, Nakhimovsky Prospekt (built 1983) in the beginning and Profsoyuznaya (built 1962) in the middle part.
