= Profsoyuznaya (Moscow Metro) =

Moscow Metro station

Profsoyuznaya Профсоюзная
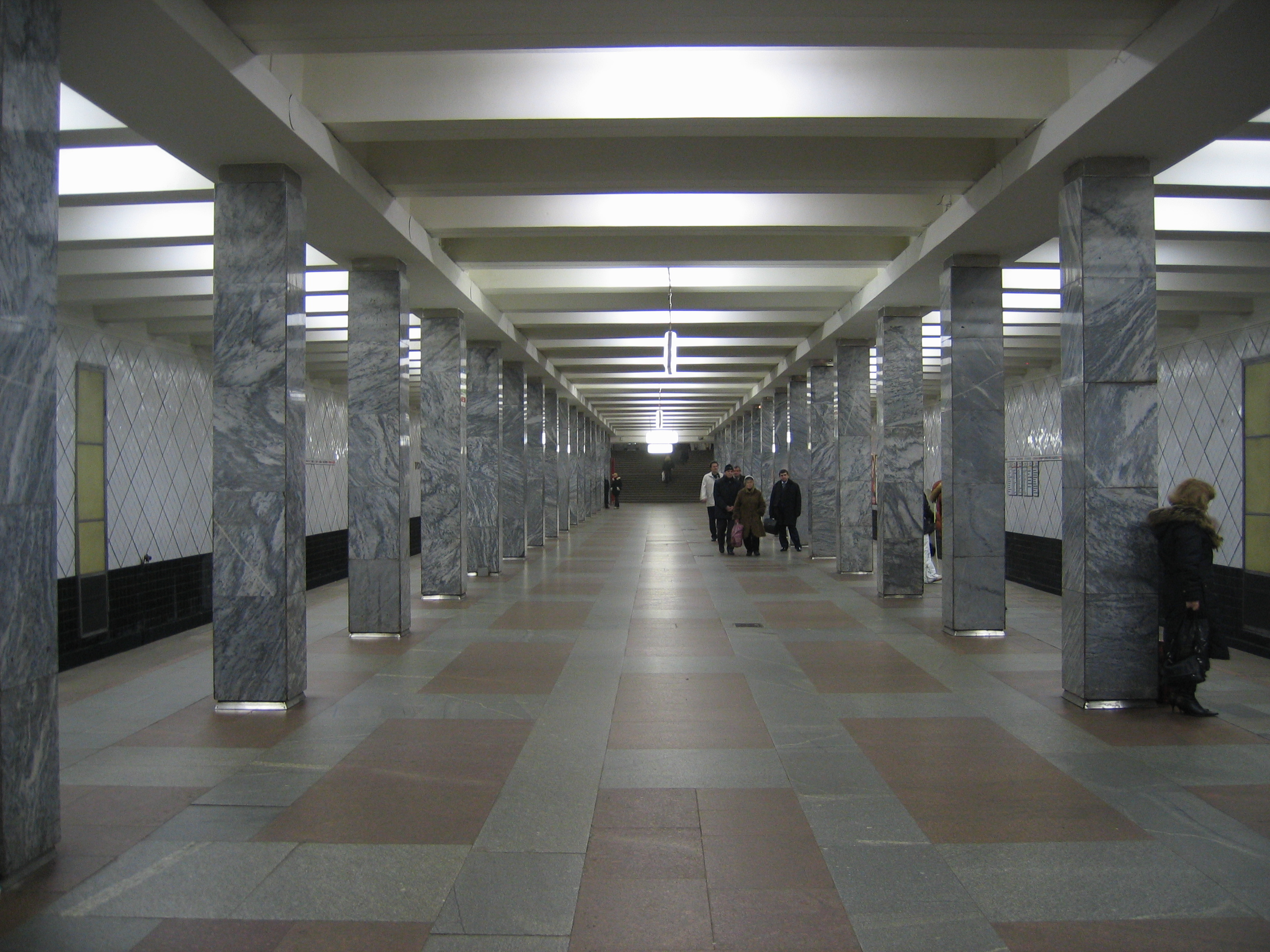

General information
- Location: Akademichesky District; Cheryomushki District; South-Western Administrative Okrug; Moscow; Russia
- Coordinates: 55.6780°N 37.5627°E
- System: Moscow Metro station
- Owner: Moskovsky Metropoliten
- Line: Kaluzhsko-Rizhskaya line
- Platforms: 1
- Tracks: 2
- Connections: Bus: 41, 44, 57, 67, 113, 121, 130, 153, 168, 196, 219, 684; Trolleybus: 49, 52, 85

Construction
- Depth: 7 metres (23 ft)
- Platform levels: 1
- Parking: No

Other information
- Station code: 102

History
- Opened: 13 October 1962; 63 years ago

Passengers
- 2002: 26,389,500

Services
Preceding station	Moscow Metro	Following station
Novye Cheryomushki towards Novoyasenevskaya	Kaluzhsko-Rizhskaya line	Akademicheskaya towards Medvedkovo
Route map
Location
- Location within Moscow Metro

Profsoyuznaya (Russian: Профсоюзная. English: Trade Union's) is a station on the Kaluzhsko-Rizhskaya Line of the Moscow Metro. Opened in 1962.

== Name ==
It is named after Profsoyuznaya Street (Trade Union street).

== Design ==
Profsoyuznaya is built to a standard column tri-span and features pillars faced (except for very thin unfinished strips at the top and bottom) with gray marble. The walls are finished with a diamond pattern made up of 4×4 squares of white ceramic tile (similar to argyle patterns, albeit simplified with use of single color). The architects responsible for the station were Nina Aleshina and N. Demchinsky.

The two underground vestibules are located on Profsoyuznaya Street, at its intersection with Nakhimovsky Avenue known as Josip Broz Tito Square.

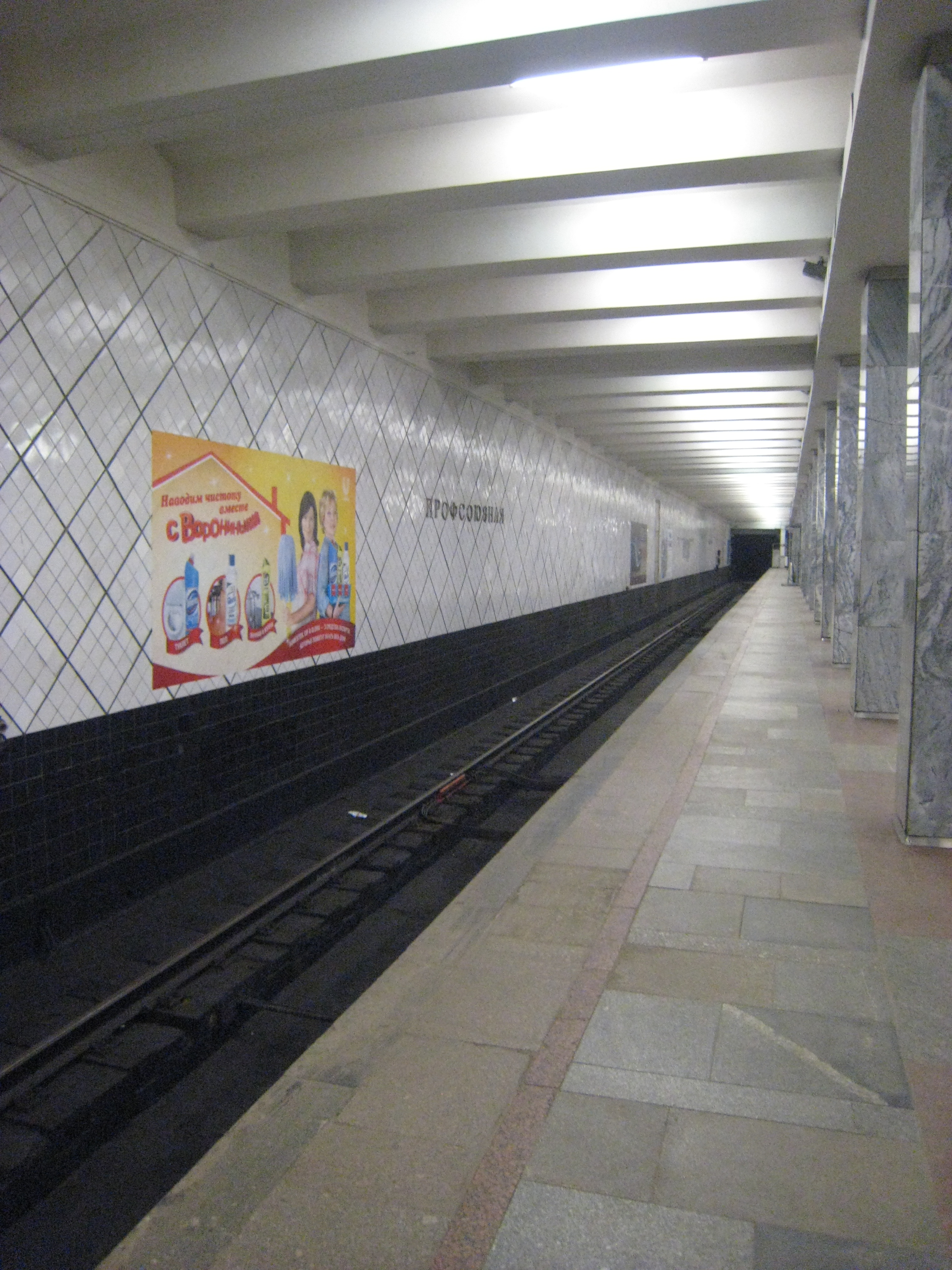
Platform view. The ad references Voronin's Family TV show.
