= Obruchevsky District =

Obruchevsky District Обручевский район (Russian)
- District
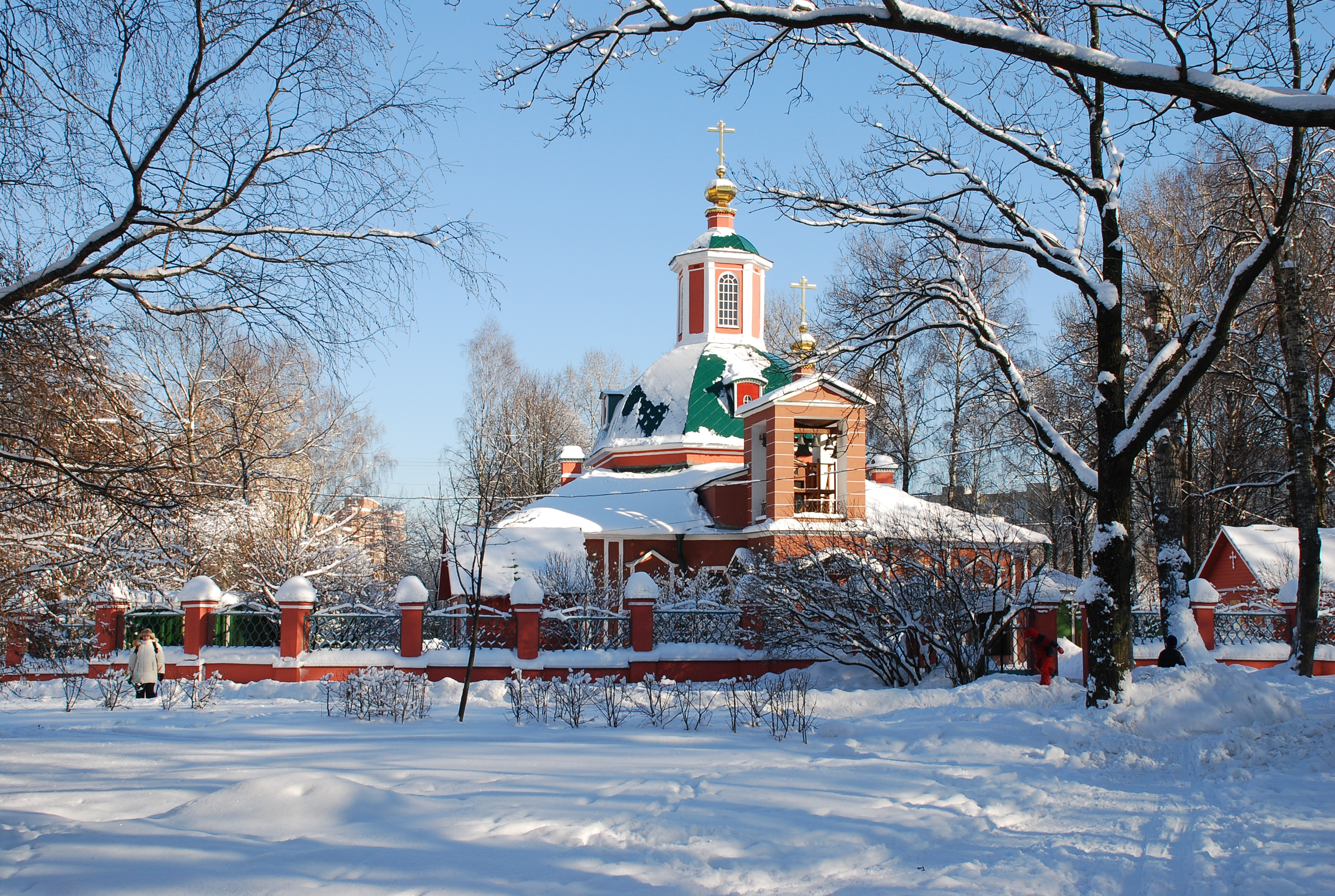
- The Church of the Holy Trinity at Vorontsovo, Obruchevsky District

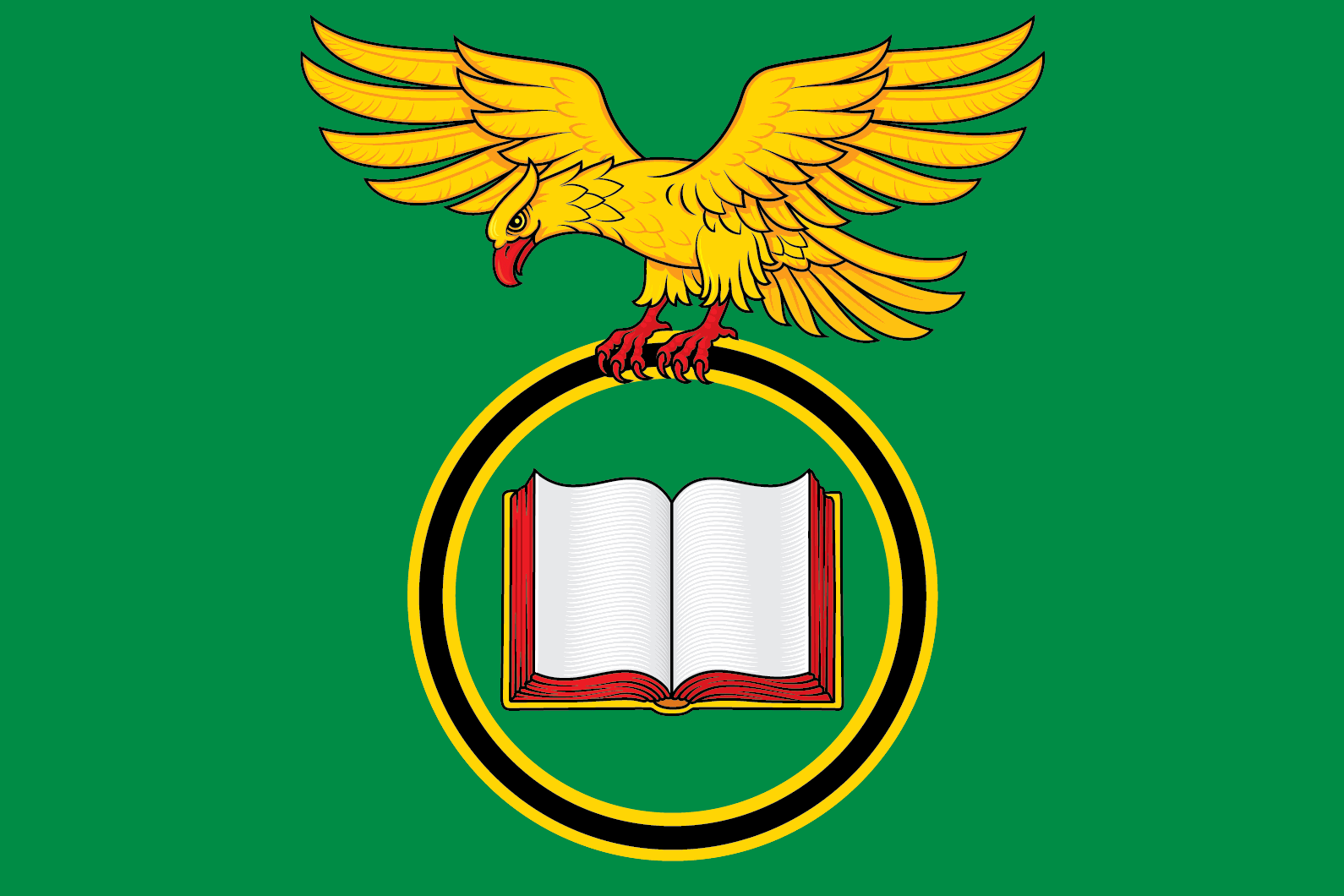
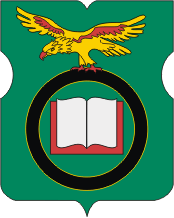
- Flag Coat of arms
- Location of Obruchevsky District in Moscow
- Coordinates: 55°39′53″N 37°31′30″E
- Country: Russia
- Federal subject: federal city of Moscow

Population (2010 Census)
  - Total: 78,619

Municipal structure
  - Municipally incorporated as: Obruchevsky Municipal Okrug
- Time zone: UTC+
- OKTMO ID: 45905000
- Website: http://obruchev.mos.ru

Population of Obruchevsky District
- 2010 Census: 78,619
- 2002 Census: 63,484

Obruchevsky District (Russian: О́бручевский райо́н) is an administrative district (raion), one of the twelve in South-Western Administrative Okrug of the federal city of Moscow, Russia. As of the 2010 Census, the total population of the district was 78,619.

== Municipal status ==
As a municipal division, it is incorporated as Obruchevsky Municipal Okrug.

== Economy ==
RusHydro, the world's second-largest hydroelectric power producer, has its head office in the district.
