= Tyoply Stan District =

Tyoply Stan District Тёплый Стан (Russian)
- District
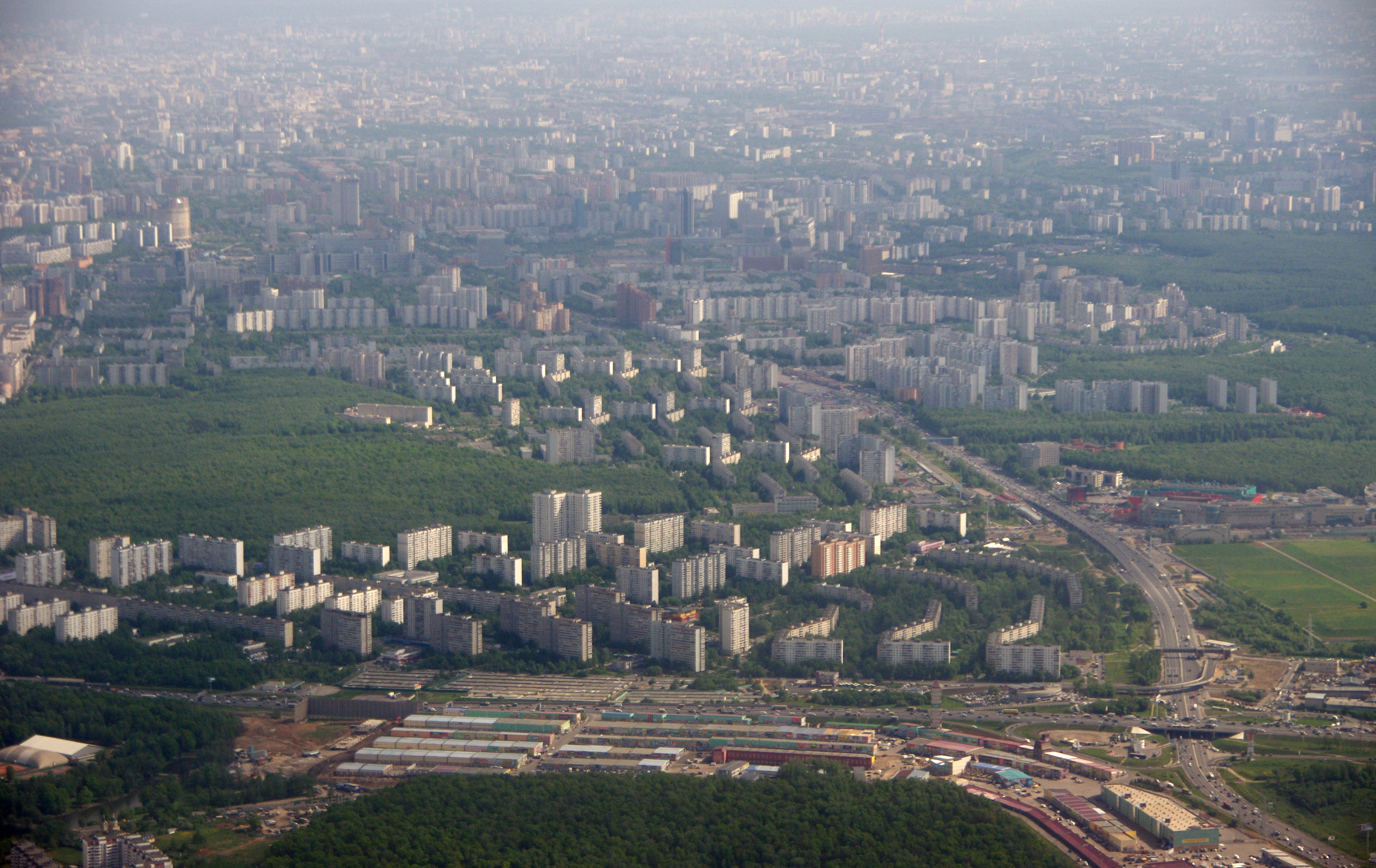
- Aerial view of Tyoply Stan District

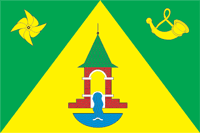
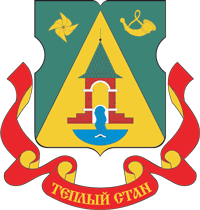
- Flag Coat of arms
- Location of Tyoply Stan District on the map of Moscow
- Coordinates: 55°37′N 37°30′E
- Country: Russia
- Federal subject: Moscow
- Established: 5 July 1995

Area
  - Total: 7.5 km^{2} (2.9 sq mi)

Population
  - Estimate: 126,000
- Time zone: UTC+
- OKTMO ID: 45907000
- Website: http://teplystan.mos.ru/

Tyoply Stan District (Russian: райо́н Тёплый Стан) is an administrative district (raion) of South-Western Administrative Okrug, and one of the 125 raions of Moscow, Russia. The area of the district is 7.5 square kilometers (2.9 sq mi).

== See also ==
- Administrative divisions of Moscow
