= Bulvar Dmitriya Donskogo =

Moscow Metro station

Bulvar Dmitriya Donskogo Бульвар Дмитрия Донского
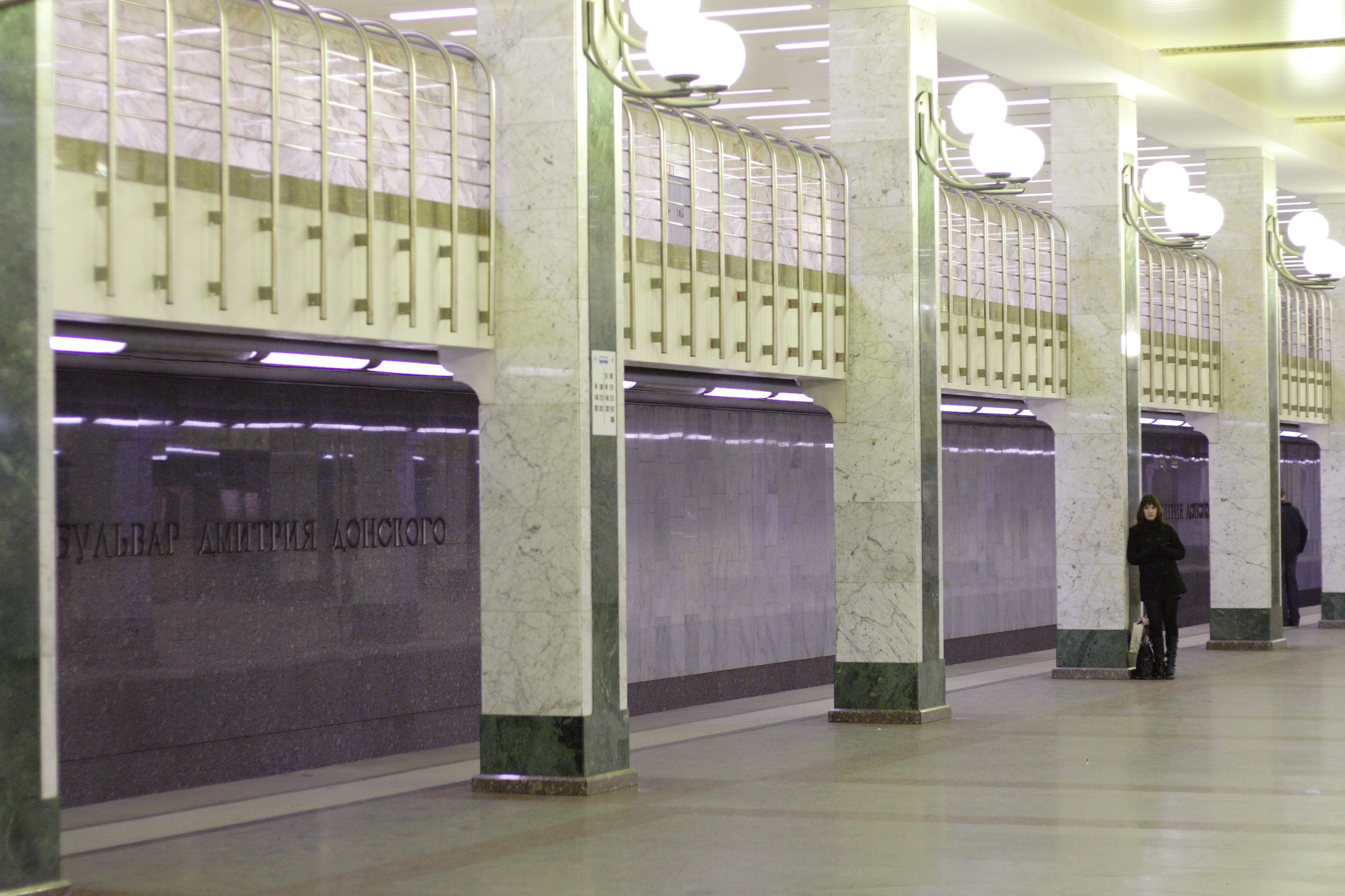

General information
- Location: Dmitriya Donskogo Boulevard; Severnoye Butovo District; South-Western Administrative Okrug; Moscow; Russia
- Coordinates: 55.5693°N 37.5769°E
- System: Moscow Metro station
- Line: Serpukhovsko-Timiryazevskaya line
- Platforms: 1
- Tracks: 2
- Connections: Bus: 94, 108, 146, 213, 262, 813

Construction
- Structure type: Shallow column tri-vault
- Depth: 10 metres (33 ft)
- Platform levels: 1
- Parking: Yes

Other information
- Station code: 191

History
- Opened: 26 December 2002; 23 years ago

Services
Preceding station	Moscow Metro	Following station
Annino towards Altufyevo	Serpukhovsko-Timiryazevskaya line	Terminus
Lesoparkovaya towards Bittsevsky Park	Butovskaya line transfer at Ulitsa Starokachalovskaya	Ulitsa Skobelevskaya towards Buninskaya Alleya
Route map
Location
- Location within Moscow Metro

Bulvar Dmitriya Donskogo (Russian: Бульвар Дмитрия Донского) is a Moscow Metro station in the Severnoye Butovo District, South-Western Administrative Okrug, Moscow, Russia. It is the southern terminus of the Serpukhovsko-Timiryazevskaya line.

Bulvar Dmitriya Donskogo, which opened in December 2002, is the newest station of the line. It was named for the street on which it is situated, which, in turn, is named for Dmitry Donskoy. It is also the first station of the system built outside the MKAD beltway encircling most of the city.

The station offers transfers to Ulitsa Starokachalovskaya station of the Butovskaya line leading further south.

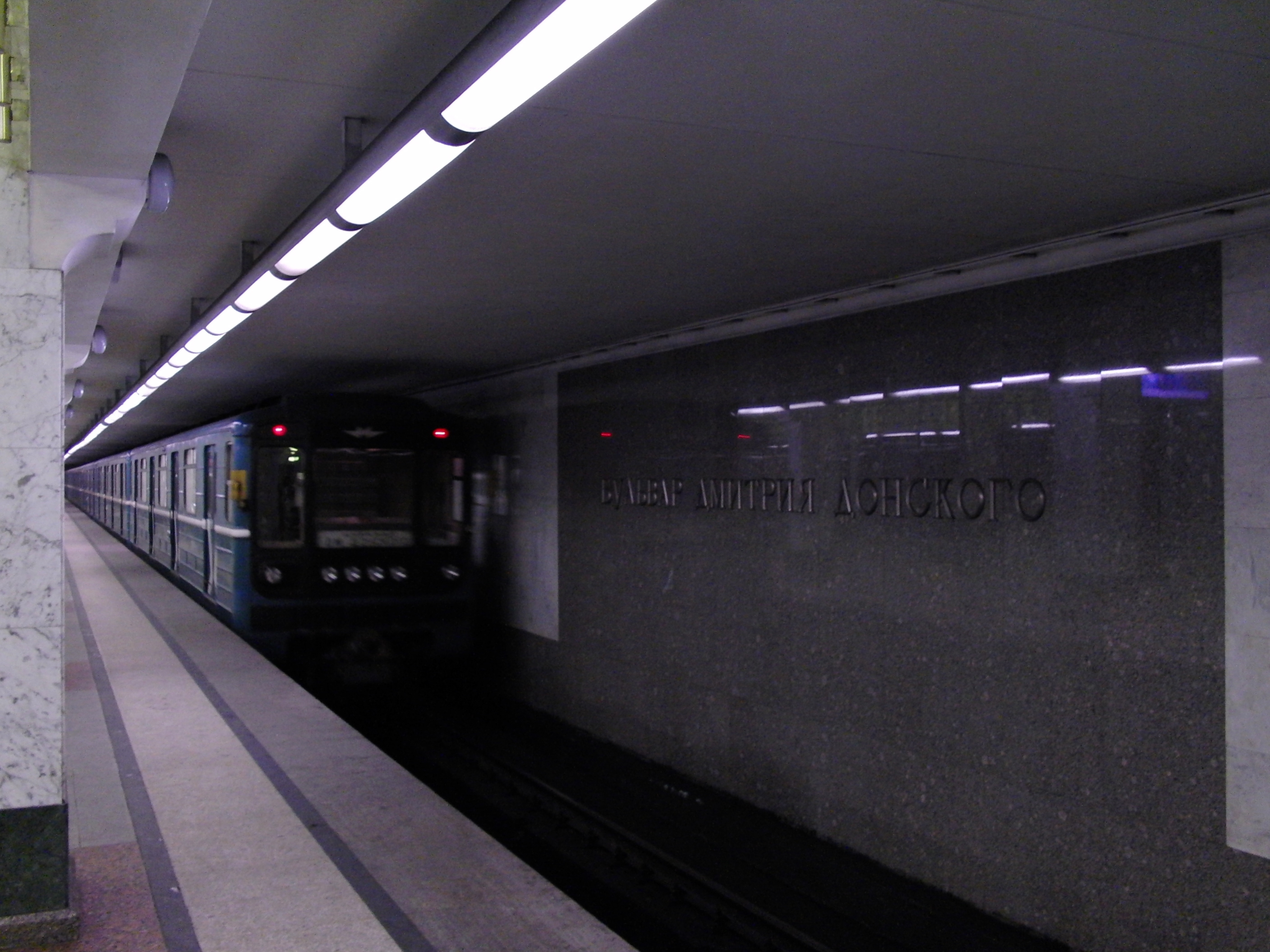
Station platform with departing train

== Design ==
There are two vestibules for station access. The second floor of the station is flanked with black and white marble. It features thick black columns with light grey ceiling tiles. A strip of green marble encases the outside of the second-level balconies, as viewed from the lower level of the station. Black, grey, and red granite adorn the floors. There are stairs connecting the platform and the upper level of the station.

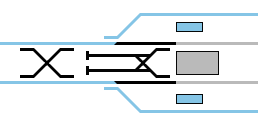
Tracks and platforms layout of Ulitsa Starokachalovskaya (light blue) and Bulvar Dmitriya Donskogo (grey)
