= Bulvar Admirala Ushakova =

Moscow Metro station

Bulvar Admirala Ushakova Бульвар Адмирала Ушакова
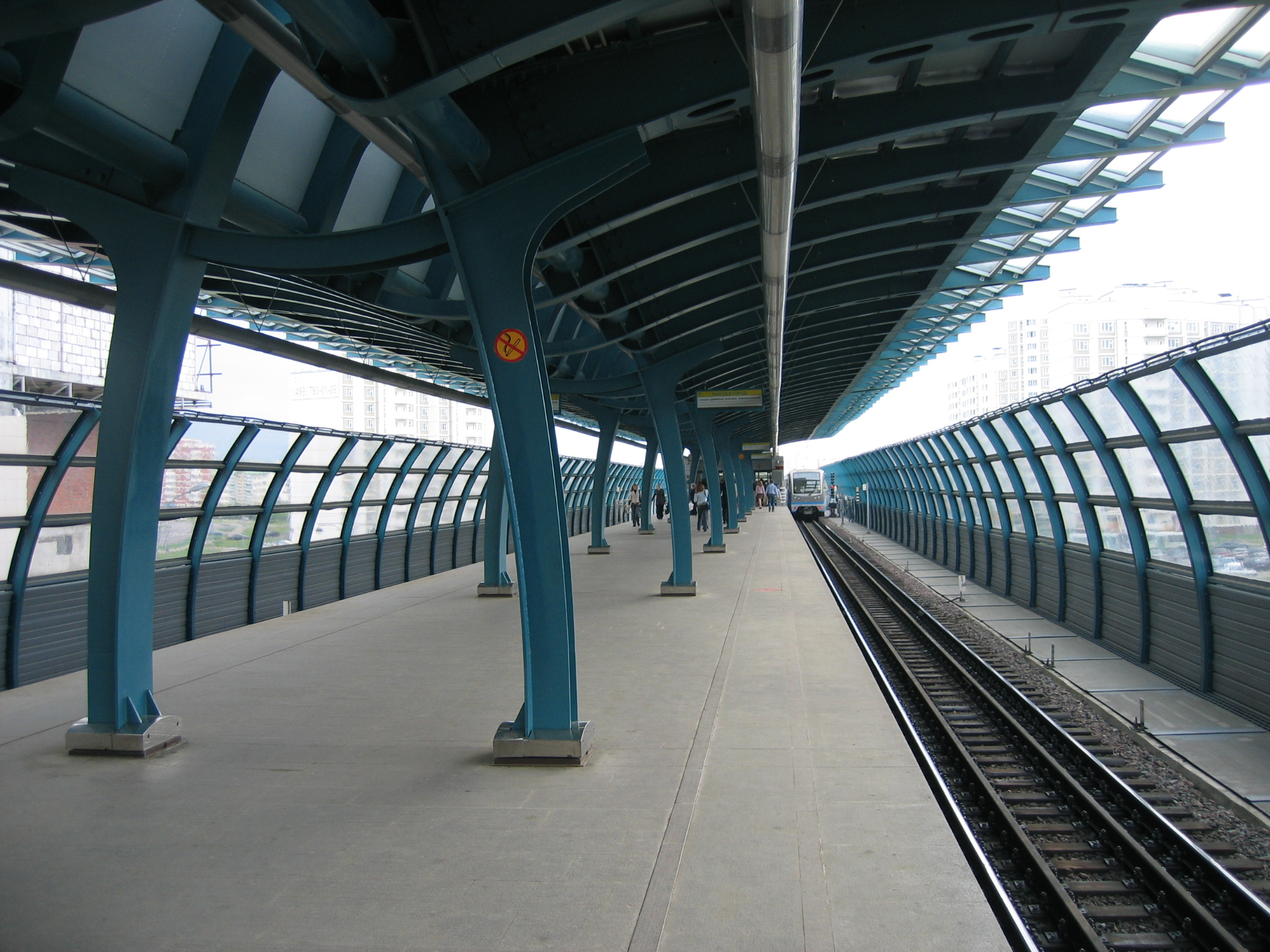

General information
- Location: Yuzhnoye Butovo District; South-Western Administrative Okrug; Moscow; Russia
- Coordinates: 55.5455°N 37.5430°E
- System: Moscow Metro station
- Owner: Moskovsky Metropoliten
- Line: Butovskaya line
- Platforms: 1
- Tracks: 2

Construction
- Platform levels: 1
- Parking: Yes
- Accessible: yes

Other information
- Station code: 191

History
- Opened: 27 December 2003; 22 years ago

Services
Preceding station	Moscow Metro	Following station
Ulitsa Skobelevskaya towards Bittsevsky Park	Butovskaya line	Ulitsa Gorchakova towards Buninskaya Alleya
Route map
Location
- Location within Moscow Metro

Bulvar Admirala Ushakova (Russian: Бульва́р Адмира́ла Ушако́ва) is a station on the Butovskaya line of the Moscow Metro system in Moscow, Russia. It was opened on 27 December 2003 along with four other metro stations. The station is located in Yuzhnoye Butovo District, between two other stations of the same line, Ulitsa Skobelevskaya and Ulitsa Gorchakova. The station, whose name literally means Admiral Ushakov Boulevard, was named after the nearby street, and the street was named after the 18th-century Russian naval commander Fyodor Ushakov.
