= Ulitsa Starokachalovskaya =

Moscow Metro station

Ulitsa Starokachalovskaya Улица Старокачаловская
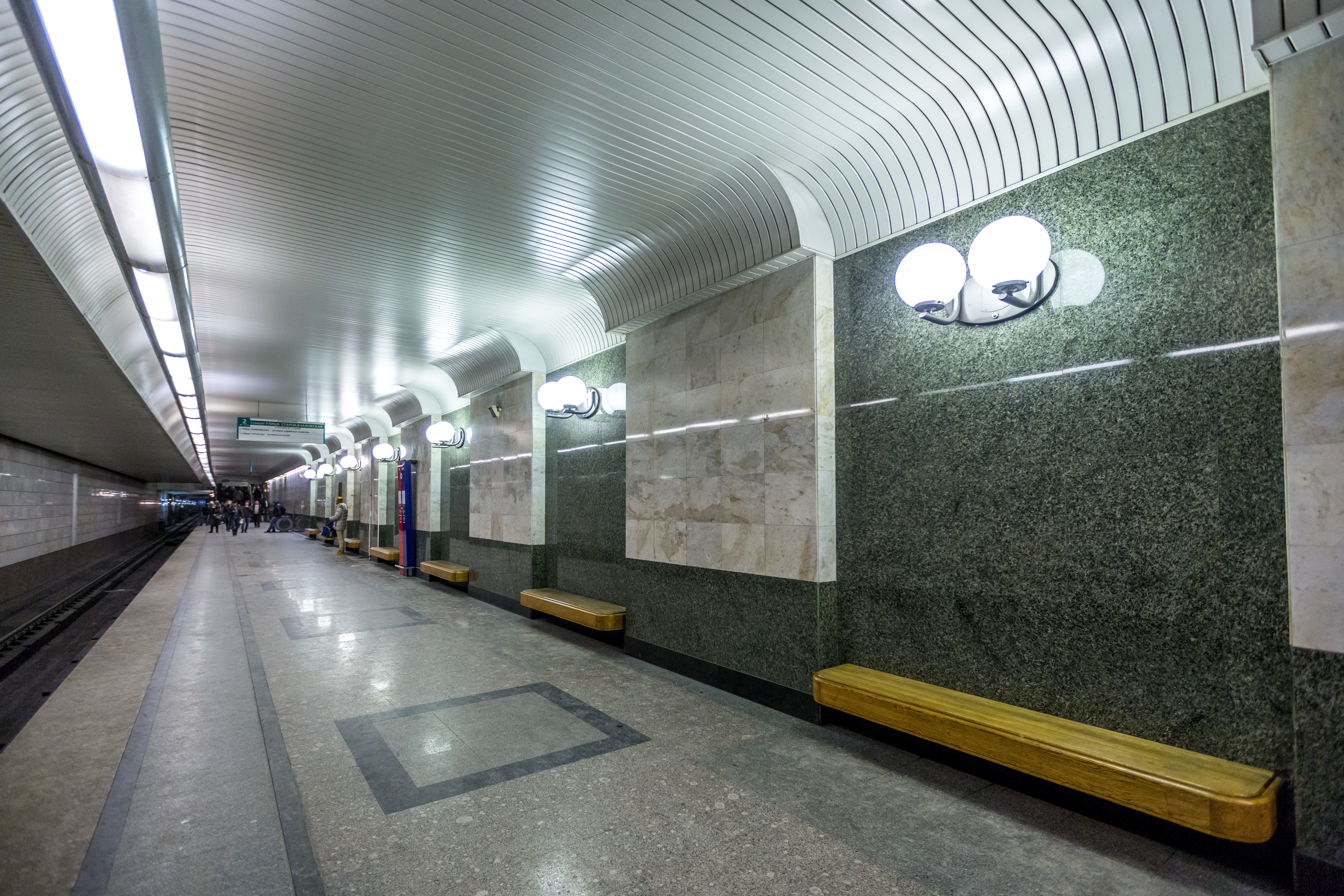

General information
- Location: Severnoye Butovo District; South-Western Administrative Okrug; Moscow; Russia
- Coordinates: 55.5690°N 37.5767°E
- System: Moscow Metro station
- Owner: Moskovsky Metropoliten
- Line: Butovskaya line
- Platforms: 2 side platforms
- Tracks: 2

Construction
- Platform levels: 1
- Parking: Yes

Other information
- Station code: 191

History
- Opened: 27 December 2003; 22 years ago

Services
Preceding station	Moscow Metro	Following station
Lesoparkovaya towards Bittsevsky Park	Butovskaya line	Ulitsa Skobelevskaya towards Buninskaya Alleya
Annino towards Altufyevo	Serpukhovsko-Timiryazevskaya line transfer at Bulvar Dmitriya Donskogo	Terminus
Route map
Location
- Location within Moscow Metro

Ulitsa Starokachalovskaya (Russian: У́лица Ста́рокачаловская) is an underground station on the Butovskaya Line of the Moscow Metro subway system in Moscow, Russia. The station, opened with four other light metro stations on 27 December 2003. Its design is unique, as it contains two separate platforms on either side of another metro station, Bulvar Dmitriya Donskogo on the Serpukhovsko-Timiryazevskaya Line.

== Name ==
It is named for the street under which the station lies.

== Building ==
The station is built with a type of iron-concrete and shiny glazed marble, with sconces in small alcoves hanging above benches for passengers waiting for the next train. The platforms are 4.5m (14 feet) wide and 102m (334 feet) long, making them the shortest platforms underground throughout the metro. It was also the only underground station on the Butovskaya line before its northward extension.

The design of Ulitsa Starokachalovskaya station is made to be similar to that of its corresponding station: Bulvar Dmitriya Donskogo. Light grey and dark green marble adorns the western platform, while light grey and orange marble flanks the walls of the eastern hall. The walls are made of marble and pink granite. The sconces providing illumination are luminescent lamps of a spherical design. Bulvar Dmitriya Donskogo is the southern terminus of the Serpukhovsko-Timiryazevskaya line.

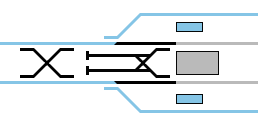
Tracks and platforms layout of Ulitsa Starokachalovskaya (light blue) and Bulvar Dmitriya Donskogo (grey)
