= Marat Khusnullin =

Russian politician (born 1966)

- Марат Хуснуллин; Марат Хөснуллин
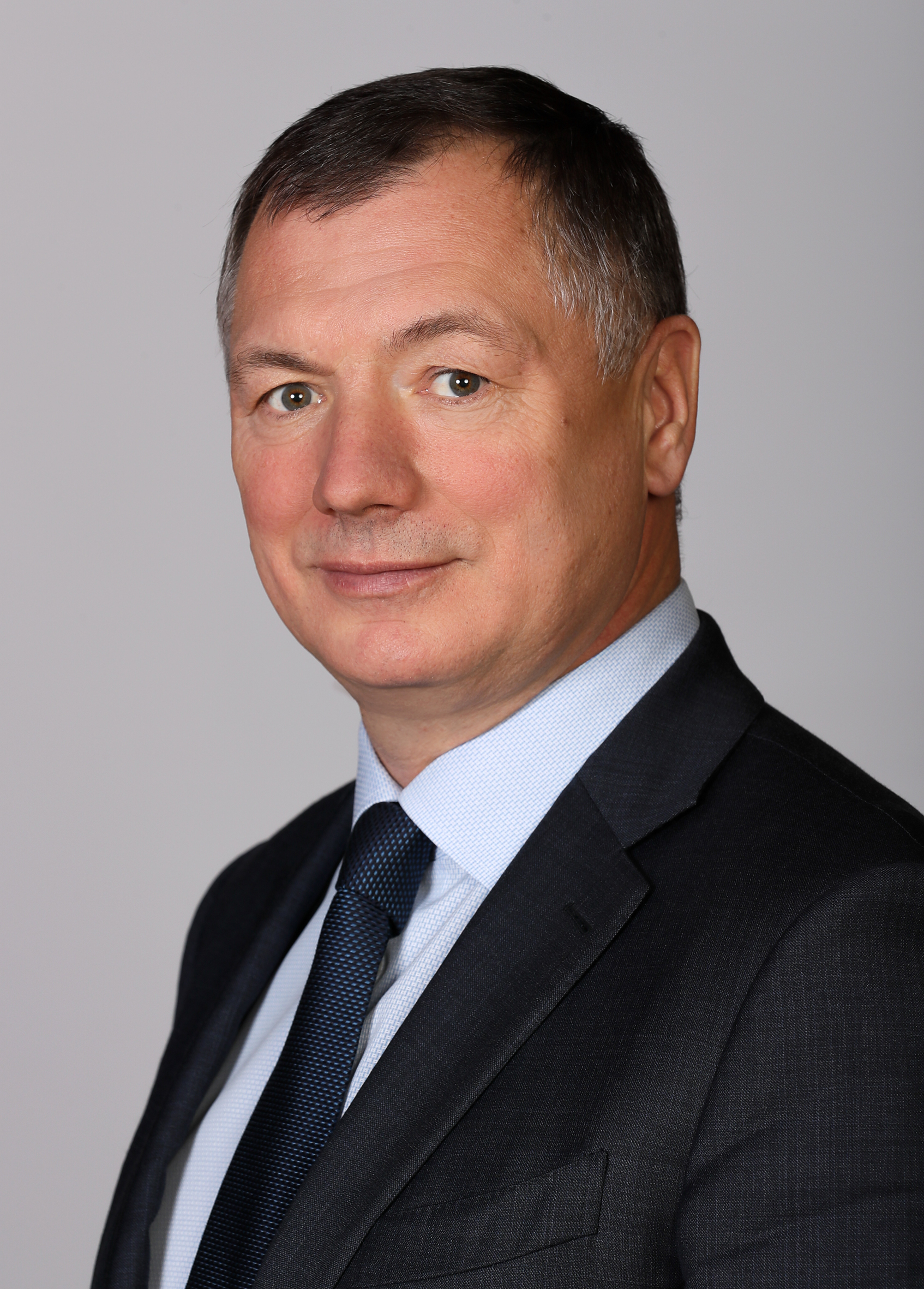
- Official portrait, 2020

Deputy Prime Minister of Russia for Construction and Regional Policy
- Incumbent
- Assumed office 21 January 2020
- Prime Minister: Mikhail Mishustin
- Preceded by: Vitaly Mutko

Deputy Mayor of Moscow for Urban Policy and Construction
- In office 2 December 2010 – 21 January 2020
- Governor: Sergey Sobyanin
- Preceded by: Vladimir Resin
- Succeeded by: Andrey Bochkaryov

Personal details
- Born: 9 August 1966 (age 60) Kazan, Tatar ASSR, Russian SFSR, Soviet Union
- Party: Independent
- Education: Kazan State Finance and Economics Institute, Open University
- Profession: politician

Marat Shakirzyanovich Khusnullin (Note: Russian: Мара́т Шакирзя́нович Хусну́ллин Tatar: Марат Шакирҗан улы Хөснуллин, romanized: Marat Şakircan ulı Xösnullin) (born 9 August 1966) is a Russian politician serving as Deputy Prime Minister of Russia for Construction and Regional Development since 2020. He previously served as Deputy Mayor of Moscow from 2010 to 2020.

== Early life and education ==
Marat was born in 1966 in Kazan, in what was then the Tatar Autonomous Soviet Socialist Republic of the Soviet Union. His mother Roza (or Rosa) Garafutdinovna Khusnullina (Russian: Роза Гарафутдиновна Хуснуллина; born 1944) is a British citizen, through whom he often has as a nominal agent for the ownership of his wealth.

In 1990 he graduated from Kazan State Finance and Economics Institute with an economics degree. He continued his postgraduate education at the Open University, graduating with a degree in Professional Management. In 2006, he obtained a Candidate of Sciences in economics.

== Career ==
=== In Tatarstan ===
From 2001 to 2010, Khusnullin served as Minister of Construction, Architecture, Housing and Utilities of the Republic of Tatarstan.

During his leadership of the Ministry of the republic was brought a large amount of federal investments, primarily under the development program of housing construction in Tatarstan. The program was focused on the development of territories agglomerations of large cities of the republic - Kazan, Naberezhnye Chelny, Nizhnekamsk, Elabuga, Almetyevsk - in a single town-planning decisions, allowing a minimal cost to ensure their utility, a result of the spatial development of the Republic of Tatarstan road transport and social Infrastructure. many cities on the production and financial potential, dynamic development were comparable with the capital of the republic.

Marat Khusnullin in Kazan began the construction of sports facilities that were involved in the 2013 Summer Universiade. By May 2010, in the capital of Tatarstan were commissioned 26 sports facilities.

=== In Moscow ===
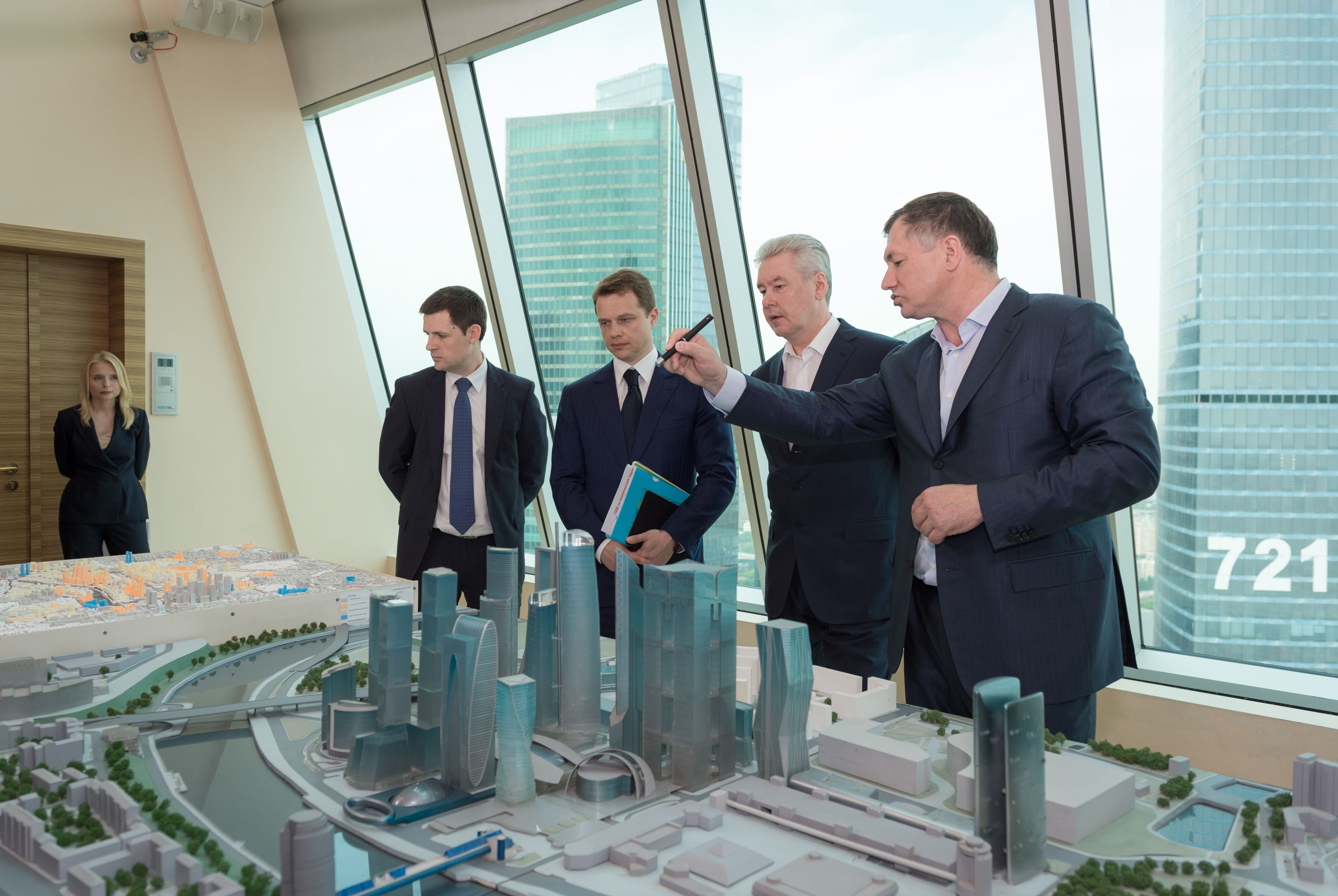
Marat Khusnullin and Moscow Mayor Sergey Sobyanin in City staff meeting on the construction of the business center "Moscow City", 29 May 2015

100% of the real estate fund is constructed in 5 years. 41 million m^{2} of real estate, 15 million m^{2} of housing. 93% solved the problem of defrauded investors.

55,000 people are involved in the construction of the Moscow Metro. 10% of the total length of the Moscow Metro is built over 5 years. constructed 35 kilometers of lines, 18 new stations (Borisovo, Shipilovskaya, Zyablikovo, Novokosino, Pyatnitskoye Shosse, Alma-Atinskaya, Lermontovsky Prospekt, Zhulebino, Delovoy Tsentr, Park Pobedy, Lesoparkovaya, Bittsevsky Park, Spartak, Troparyovo, Kotelniki, Tekhnopark, Rumyantsevo and Salaryevo), 4 electrodepot. construction of a Third Interchange Contour. construction of Moscow Central Circle (54 km of lines, 31 stations) Moscow Railway will be part of a single Moscow urban public transport system. 31 modern transport interchange hubs will be built on Moscow Central Circle. Transport hubs will connect the metro, railway, public and private transport. In their structure will work offices, shopping malls, shops and cafes.

In 5 years built 10% of the existing urban road network. 400 km of roads built in 5 years. 118 bridges, overpass and tunnels. 140 pedestrian crossings, 12 traffic interchanges at the intersection with the Moscow Ring Road, 8 highways.

Moscow has ceased to be a leader in traffic jams among megacities, 16% Moscow improved its on busy roads renovation of industrial zones, the city return 13 thousand hectares of depressed areas.

He served as Deputy Mayor of Moscow from 2010 to 2020.

Expansion in Moscow in 2011 (the so-called "New Moscow"), the biggest in the history of the administrative-territorial division of the city's expansion project in Moscow is about 2.4 times at the expense of the Moscow region. New Moscow by 2015, 40% increase in the population of the new Moscow, a 2-fold increase in the number of jobs. in 4 years introduced 9.48 million m^{2} of real estate in New Moscow. built and put into operation 23 kindergartens, 8 schools, 9 objects of healthcare including 7 clinics. The first subway line, which stretches into new territories, became Sokolnicheskaya Line. The length of the renewable area - 7.6 km. It opened two new stations - Rumyantsevo and Salaryevo.

120 km of embankments of Moskva River will be landscaped, 24 bridges will be built, 40 new public space. in 2017 Moscow will have a landscape park, park Zaryadye where previously there was Rossiya Hotel. 12-million a year park attendance.

Since March 2012 he led the staff to address the issues and the construction of MIBC "Moscow-City" (due to the 2008 financial crisis had suspended work on the construction of the towers of the "Federation Tower" and "Russia Tower" and complex "Evolution Tower": due to the lack of credit resources investors or frozen work or out of the project). the plan was revised delivery of objects: all work will be completed in 2016; due to the bandwidth of access roads, it was decided to abandon the 20 thousand parking spaces in the "Moscow City" - because in the long term this could adversely affect the transport situation and lead to the collapse of the region. Instead, it was decided to reconstruct part of the streets in the area of MIBC, in particular to build new transport interchanges (the construction of seven additional multi-lane road junctions around 2.5 km length was completed in autumn 2012).

In the spring of 2013 adopted a draft plan of industrial zone "ZiL", former ZiL plant. The territory is divided into nine functional parts, which will be built in residential neighborhoods, business center, parks, sports cluster, the production of cars. As a result, on the site of an abandoned industrial zone will "city within a city" with the available transport infrastructure, jobs and social facilities. in the new district will live 40 thousand people and about 50 thousand new jobs. The construction of the first facilities in the territory of the former ZiL plant began in late 2013. VTB Ice Palace was built in Zil area.

Children's amusement park "Island of Dreams" is being built in 2016 on the territory of Nagatino Poima in Nagatinsky Zaton District. The territory of the new theme park covers 100 hectares and will include the world’s biggest theme amusement park, multifunctional concert hall, multiplex, hotel, yacht club and children’s yacht school. Much of this territory will be developed as a public park, including a pedestrian zone along the bank of the Moscow River. the theme park area comparable to the size of 25 football fields.

2017 FIFA Confederations Cup and 2018 FIFA World Cup, Khusnullin directs the project for reconstruction of Luzhniki stadium and adjacent infrastructure. 6 training pitches including 3 field in the territory of Luzhniki. 11 new soccer fields, Spartak metro station, Luzhniki station. Luzhniki and Otkrytiye Arena will host both tournaments in Moscow. CSKA Moscow Stadium and VTB Arena will be a training field during World Cup 2018.

In September 2016 the movement on the Moscow Central Circle (MCC) was launched. For the first time in the history of the city at the same time we introduced a 54 km routes and 31 stations. From the first days of the MCC gained popularity among Muscovites: this ring every day transports more than 300 thousand passengers. in three and a half months 25 million passengers have used MCC.

In 2016, in operation passed the 101.6 kilometers of roads, 45 bridges, tunnels and overpasses and 21 pedestrian crossing. Over the past year it was built more than 40 social facilities: kindergartens, schools, hospitals, sports and cultural facilities.

The social infrastructure of the city has replenished with 10 school buildings, 14 kindergartens, five buildings of medical facilities, sports facilities and four objects of culture.

Total 417 social facilities were built in six years, including 67 school buildings and blocks of primary school, 195 kindergartens, 56 health facilities, 63 sports facilities and 36 cultural facilities.

59 five-storey buildings demolished series has been dismantled in the past year (since the beginning of the program in 1644 demolished the house). Thus, urban resettlement of citizens from dilapidated housing program was implemented by 95 percent, and new apartments have received more than 150 thousand families.

In 2016 in Moscow, built about 8 million m^{2} of real estate, including 3.3 million m^{2} of housing. At the same time 90 percent of all the entered facilities were built at the expense of extra-budgetary sources.

=== In the federal government ===
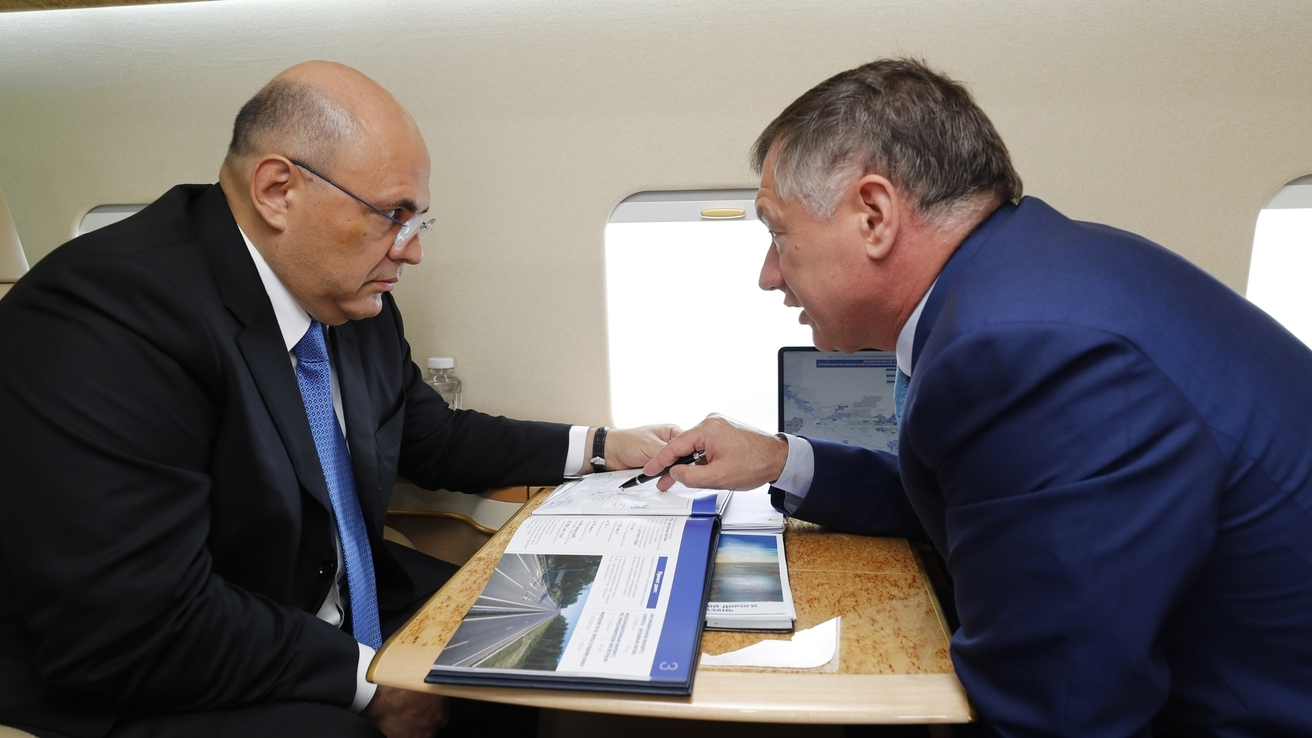
Marat Khusnullin and Prime Minister Mikhail Mishustin conduct a helicopter inspection of the construction of the Moscow–Kazan highway, 10 July 2020

On 21 January 2020, Khusnullin was appointed Deputy Prime Minister of Russia for construction and regional development in Mishustin’s cabinet.

On 21 October 2020, Kremlin spokesman Dmitry Peskov told reporters that president Putin would discuss the problem of water supply to Crimea with Khusnullin later in the day. The same day, Oleksii Reznikov, the Ukrainian minister of reintegration of temporarily occupied territories, stated that Ukraine would resume the supply of water to Crimea through the North Crimean Canal after the peninsula is "deoccupied" and that until then, it is the responsibility of Russia to supply water.

== Personal life ==
He was married to Lilia Khusnullina (Russian: Лилия Хуснуллина) until their divorce on 26 October 2018 after which she changed her name to Lilia Kharisova (Russian: Лилия Харисова). They have three children.

In May 2011, his daughter Alina Khusnullina or Alina Kireeva (Russian: Алина Киреева; born 1991 or 1992) became the owner of the BVI-based firm Brenigton Enterprises Limited which owned the Cyprus-based firm Belasa Ltd. and through her father's relationships in the Moscow Stroycomplex (building complex) (Russian: Стройкомплекс Москвы) especially from Kazan, she owns nearly 6,000 hectares (15,000 acres) of farm ground, controls a 29.9% stake in the Chistopol hotel (Russian: «Чистополь») in Tatarstan which is in addition to her grandmother Roza Khusnillina's 27.127% stake, and is a supervisory board member of a hotel company the Business Medical Center (Russian: «Деловой медицинский центр»). She and her husband own a luxury apartment in Moscow.

=== Sanctions ===
In February 2022, Khusnullin was put on the European Union sanctions list for being "responsible for actions and policies that undermine and threaten the territorial integrity, sovereignty and independence of Ukraine as well as the stability or security in Ukraine."

He was sanctioned by the UK government in 2022 in relation to the Russo-Ukrainian War.

== Honours and awards ==
- Medal of Merit in the All-Russia Census. (2002)
- Honorary title of Merited Builder of Russia. (2004)
- Honorary title of Merited Builder of the Republic of Tatarstan. (2005)
- Medal "In Commemoration of the 1000th Anniversary of Kazan". (2005)
- Medal "100 Years of Russia’s Trade Unions". (2005)
- Medal of the Order "For Merit to the Fatherland" (2nd Class). (2008)
- Order for Service to the Republic of Tatarstan. (2010)
- Honored Builder of the Russian Federation (2013)
