= Novoyasenevskaya (Moscow Metro) =

Moscow Metro station

Novoyasenevskaya Новоясеневская
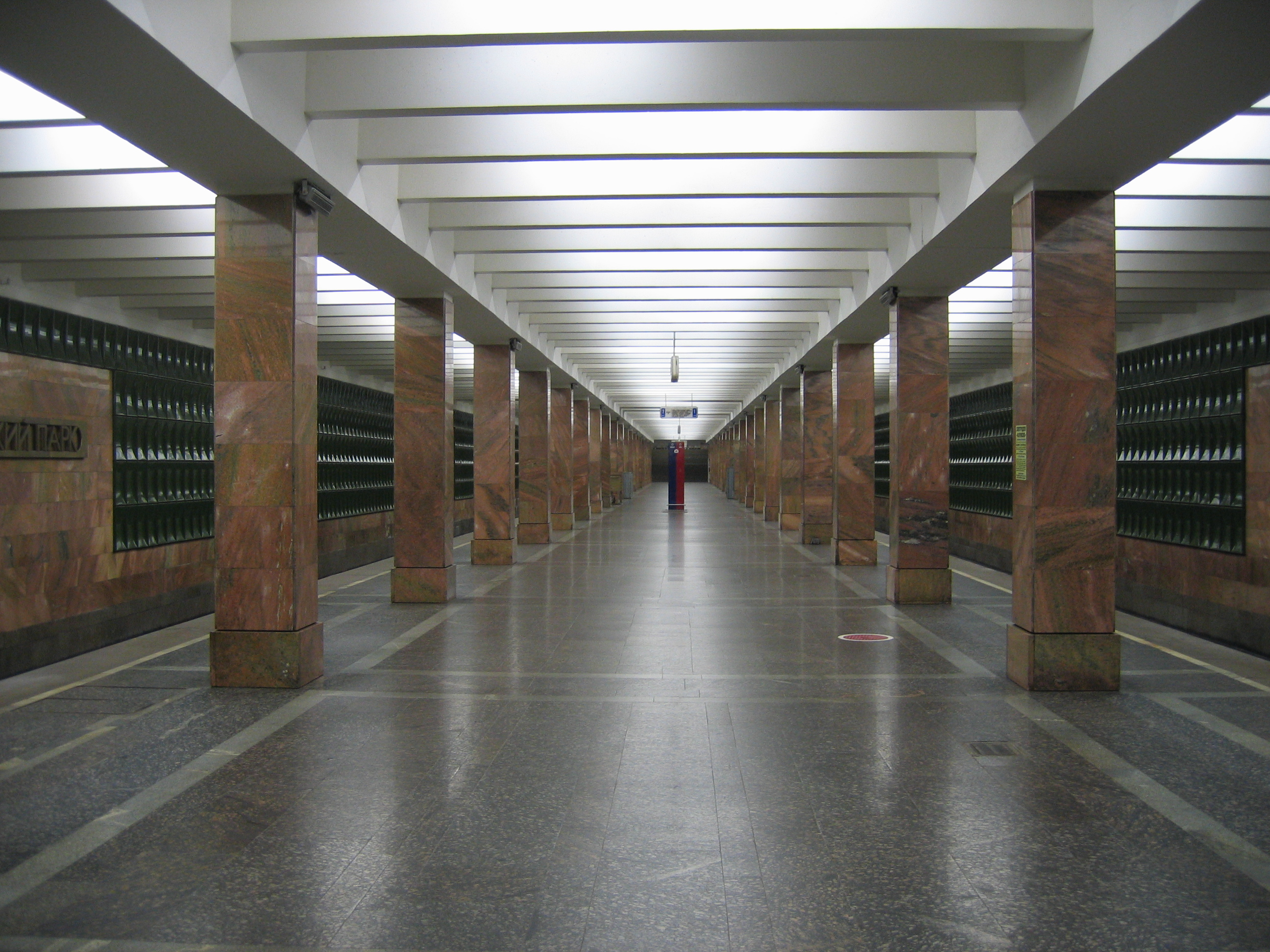

General information
- Location: Yasenevo District; South-Western Administrative Okrug; Moscow; Russia
- Coordinates: 55.6010°N 37.5541°E
- System: Moscow Metro station
- Owner: Moskovsky Metropoliten
- Line: Kaluzhsko-Rizhskaya line
- Platforms: 1 island platform
- Tracks: 2
- Connections: Bus: 262, 648, 651; Trolleybus: 81

Construction
- Structure type: Shallow column tri-span
- Depth: 7 metres (23 ft)
- Platform levels: 1
- Parking: No
- Accessible: Yes

Other information
- Station code: 109

History
- Opened: 17 January 1990; 36 years ago
- Former names: Bittsevsky Park (1990–2009)

Passengers
- 2010: 4,035,805

Services
Preceding station	Moscow Metro	Following station
Terminus	Kaluzhsko-Rizhskaya line	Yasenevo towards Medvedkovo
Terminus	Butovskaya line transfer at Bittsevsky Park	Lesoparkovaya towards Buninskaya Alleya
Route map
Location
- Location within Moscow Metro

Novoyasenevskaya (Russian: Новоя́сеневская), formerly Bittsevsky Park (Russian: Би́тцевский парк) is a Moscow Metro station in the Yasenevo District, South-Western Administrative Okrug, Moscow. The station is southern terminus on the Kaluzhsko-Rizhskaya Line.

== Name ==
The station was originally named Bittsevsky Park for the nearby Bitsa Park. On 3 June 2008, the city government issued a decree to rename the station to Novoyasenevskaya on 1 June 2009. Moscow Metro was granted a one-year transition period to effect the change. The new name reflects the station's location in the Yasenevo District along Novoyasenovo Ulitsa. The reason for the change was the city wanted to transfer the Bittsevsky Park name to the station on the Butovskaya line.

== Building ==
The station was designed by architects N. Shumakov, G. Mun, and N. Shurygina and has a tri-vault column structure. Novoyasenevskaya station walls and pillars are faced with deep pink marble and dark green metallic.

Novoyasenevskaya has two entrances, but only one is in operation due to the relatively low number of passengers handled by the station each day. The active entrance is a part of a subway beneath Novoyasenevsky Avenue. The unused ground-level eastern vestibule sits further down the road, on the edge of the park. It is a round building, finished with grey marble and pinkish granite and topped with a disproportionately large weather vane. The exit stairs at the east end of the platform, which lead to this vestibule, are barricaded.

== Transfer ==
Bittsevsky Park station of the Butovskaya Line opened on 27 February 2014, providing a transfer between the two lines.

== Gallery ==
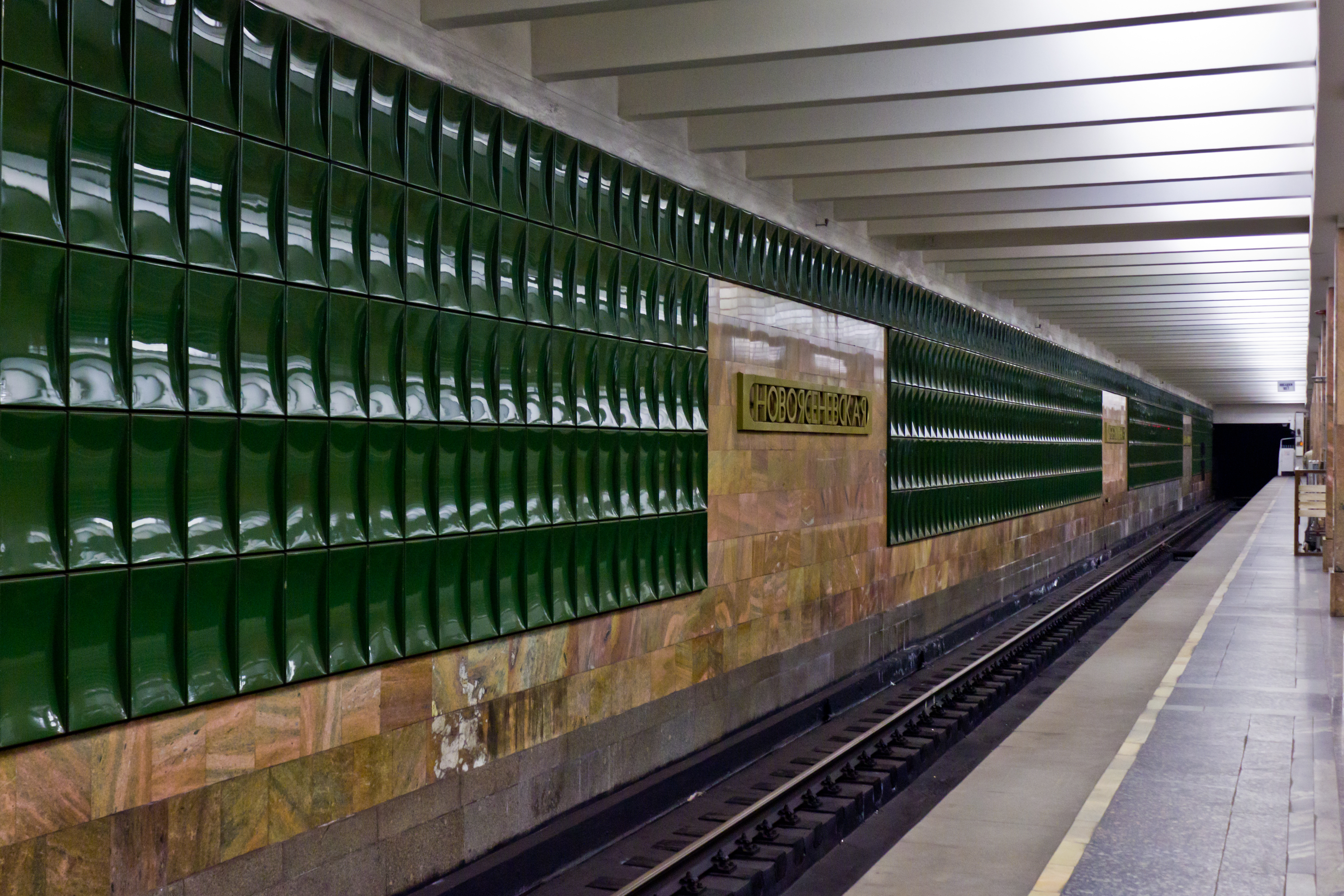
Station platform
