= Ulitsa Skobelevskaya =

Moscow Metro station

Ulitsa Skobelevskaya Улица Скобелевская
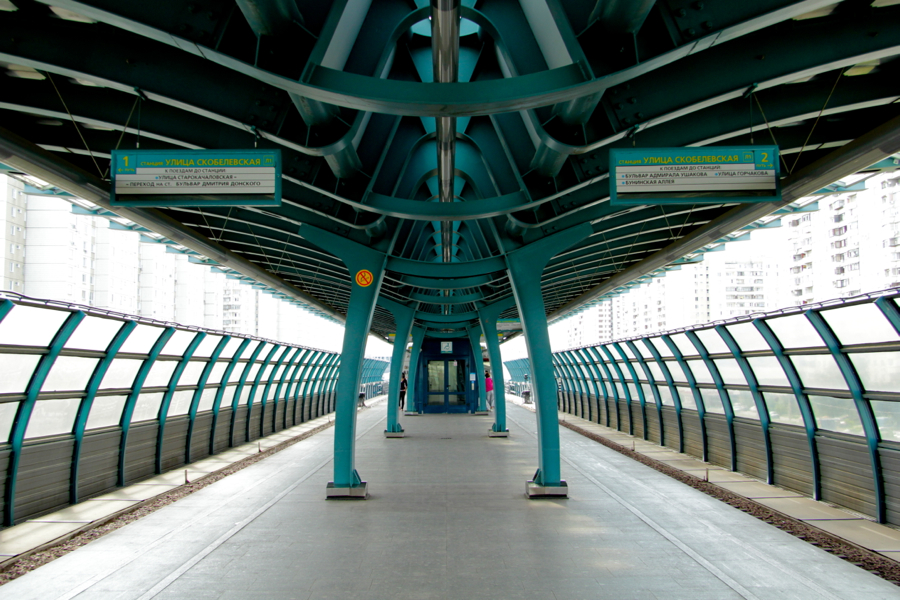

General information
- Location: Yuzhnoye Butovo District; South-Western Administrative Okrug; Moscow; Russia
- Coordinates: 55.5481°N 37.5546°E
- System: Moscow Metro station
- Owner: Moskovsky Metropoliten
- Line: Butovskaya line
- Platforms: 1
- Tracks: 2

Construction
- Platform levels: 1
- Parking: No
- Accessible: yes

Other information
- Station code: 192

History
- Opened: 27 December 2003; 22 years ago

Services
Preceding station	Moscow Metro	Following station
Ulitsa Starokachalovskaya towards Bittsevsky Park	Butovskaya line	Bulvar Admirala Ushakova towards Buninskaya Alleya
Route map
Location
- Location within Moscow Metro

Ulitsa Skobelevskaya (Russian: У́лица Ско́белевская) is a station on the Butovskaya Line of the Moscow Metro system in Moscow, Russia. Opened on 27 December 2003 along with four other stations, it is named after the street that it serves, dedicated to Russian-Turkish war hero Mikhail Skobelev.

Two of the station's lobbies are located on Admiral Ushakov Boulevard and on Skobelev street. In the centre of the platform there are enclosed escalators and a lift for disabled access to the station.

The design of Ulitsa Skobelevskaya station is simple and almost identical to the four other stations to the south. It is located on an elevated viaduct with a light green and curvy canopy stretching over the entire platform. There are large sound and wind barriers on either side of the platform. The single-island platform itself is 90 m (295 feet) long, 7 m (22 feet) wide, and 9.6 m (31 feet) above the ground.
