= Ulitsa Gorchakova =

Moscow Metro station

Ulitsa Gorchakova Улица Горчакова
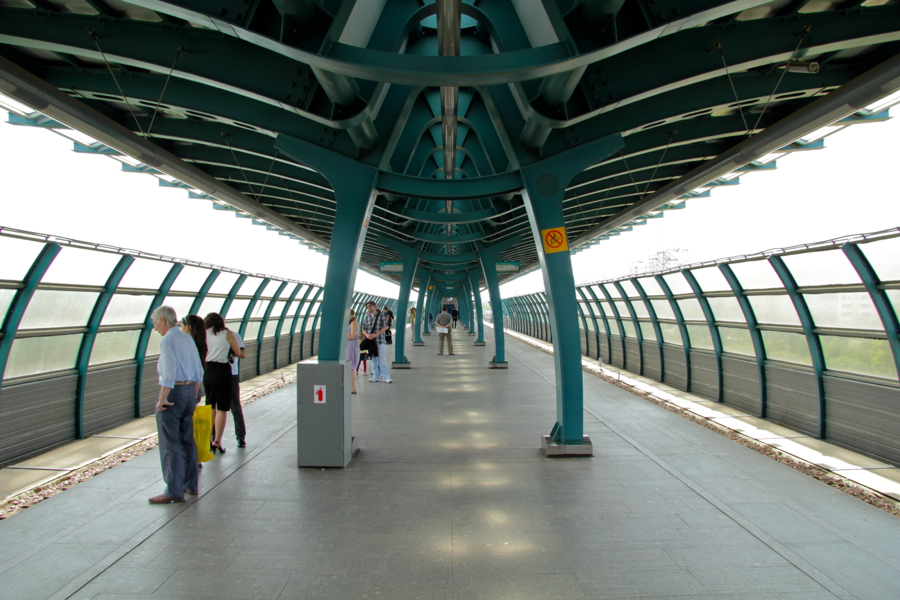

General information
- Location: Yuzhnoye Butovo District; South-Western Administrative Okrug; Moscow; Russia
- Coordinates: 55.5418°N 37.5308°E
- System: Moscow Metro station
- Owner: Moskovsky Metropoliten
- Line: Butovskaya line
- Platforms: 1
- Tracks: 2

Construction
- Platform levels: 1
- Parking: No
- Accessible: yes

Other information
- Station code: 194

History
- Opened: 27 December 2003; 22 years ago

Services
Preceding station	Moscow Metro	Following station
Bulvar Admirala Ushakova towards Bittsevsky Park	Butovskaya line	Buninskaya Alleya Terminus
Route map
Location
- Location within Moscow Metro

Ulitsa Gorchakova (Russian: У́лица Горчако́ва) is a station on the Butovskaya line of the Moscow Metro system in Moscow, Russia. It was opened on 27 December 2003 along with four other metro stations. The station is located in Yuzhnoye Butovo District, between two other stations of the same line, Bulvar Admirala Ushakova and Buninskaya Alleya. A transfer to the Sokolnicheskaya line is planned.

== Name ==
The station, which name literally means Gorchakov Street, was named after the nearby street, and the street was named after the 19th-century Russian diplomat Alexander Gorchakov.

== Location ==
The station is located at the intersection of Gorchakova Street and Chernyovskaya Street. It has only one exit, located at the eastern side of the station.

== Building ==
As most of the other stations in Butovskaya Line, Ulitsa Gorchakova station is built on an elevated viaduct. There is an escalator leading to the exit. The station is built in open air and has a roof. It is separated from the nearby buildings by barriers for sound isolation. The architect of the station was Leonid Borzenkov.
