= Butovskaya line =

Moscow Metro line

Overview
- Owner: Moskovsky Metropoliten
- Locale: Moscow
- Termini: Bittsevsky Park (northern); Buninskaya Alleya (southern)
- Stations: 7

Service
- Type: Rapid transit
- System: Moscow Metro
- Operator(s): Moskovsky Metropoliten
- Rolling stock: 81-740/741; 81-740/741.1; 81-740А/741А; 81-740.4/741.4
- Ridership: 17.70 million (2012)

History
- Opened: 27 December 2003; 22 years ago
- Last extension: 2014

Technical
- Line length: 10 kilometres (6.2 mi)
- Character: Underground & Elevated
- Track gauge: 1,520 mm (4 ft 11 27/32 in)
- Electrification: Third rail
Route map

The Butovskaya line (Russian: Бу́товская ли́ния, IPA: [ˈbutəfskəjə ˈlʲinʲɪjə]) (Line 12; Periwinkle Line) is a line of the Moscow Metro that serves Russia's capital Moscow.

The line was an experiment for building rapid-transit in areas where boring or excavation for Metro tunnels is considered expensive and impractical. Previously, attempts had been made to build lines at ground level, like the Filyovskaya line, but harsh Russian winters and the occupation of the large amount of useful land, make such projects impractical. Still, more and more districts emerging on the edge of the city, particularly beyond the Moscow Automobile Ring Road (MKAD), required some kind of rapid-transit connection.

In the late 1980s Moscow Metro design bureau, Metrogiprotrans started to develop a set of projects that would bring rapid-transit beyond MKAD, using a system of tracks raised above ground. Yuzhnoye Butovo District was the first district to be connected in such a way.

The term light metro (Лёгкое метро́) was applied to these new projects, as it would feature a continuous elevated structure. Special rolling stock had to be developed to serve the line, as it would have to be resistant to the harsher climate elements and be able to negotiate sharper curves. For ease of operation, the light metro was integrated into the conventional metro service.

The Butovskaya line essentially extends the Serpukhovsko-Timiryazevskaya line beyond the Serpukhovsky terminus. The 5.6 kilometres (3.5 mi) line was opened on 27 December 2003. The first 1.6 kilometres (0.99 mi) were bored in a tunnel, which allowed for a convenient transfer connection at the Bulvar Dmitriya Donskogo terminus. For the rest of its length it is elevated, with both single and double tracks protected by a sound barrier. Currently four elevated stations, each of identical design, are in operation. All of them except Ulitsa Starokachalovskaya have a lift for wheelchair users only.

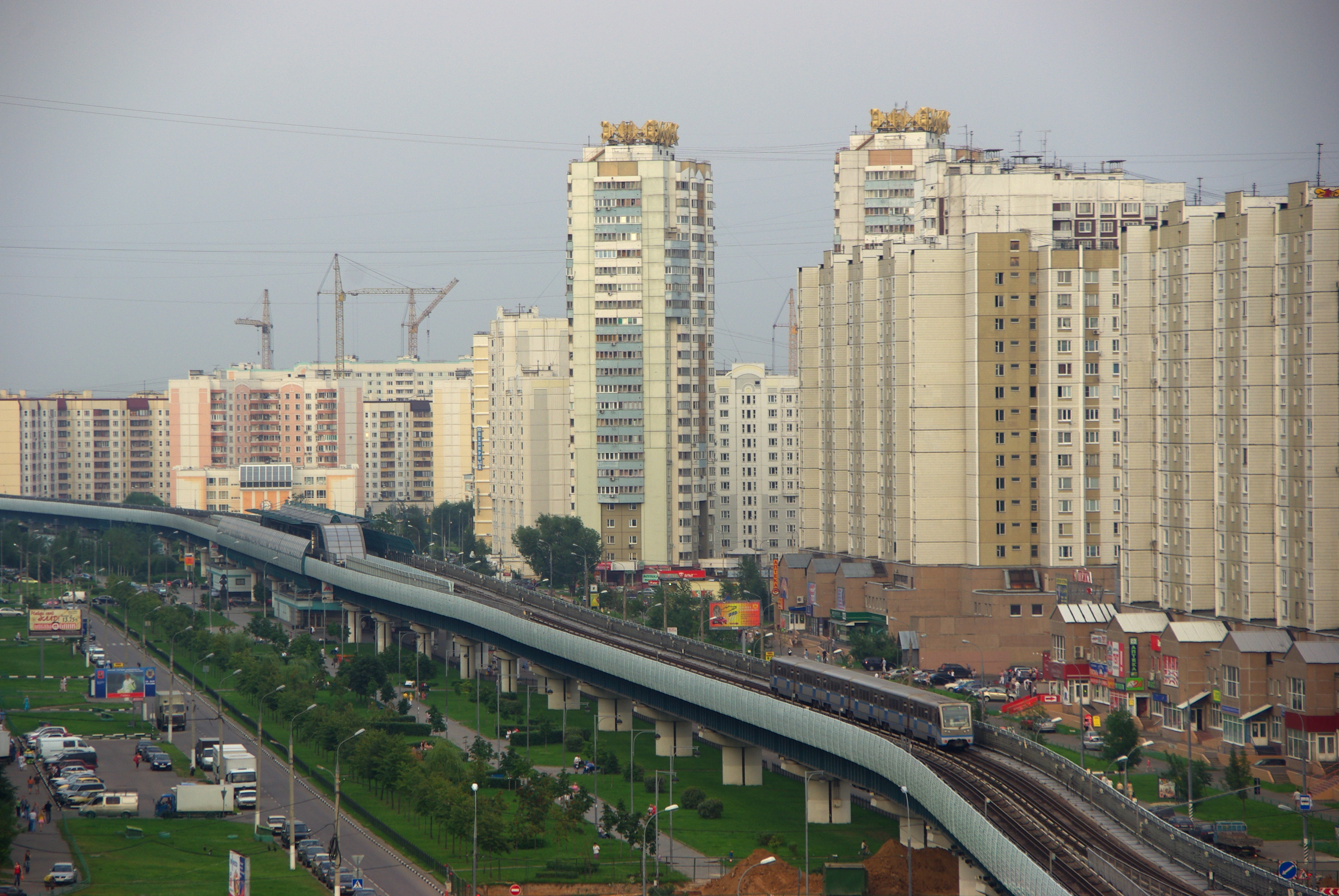
Train at middle of line

The line interchanges with Line 9 at Ulitsa Starokachalovskaya and Line 6 at Bittsevsky Park.

== Stations ==
Station Name		Transfer
English	Russian	Transfer
Bittsevsky Park	Битцевский парк	Novoyasenevskaya
Lesoparkovaya	Лесопарковая	
Ulitsa Starokachalovskaya	Улица Старокачаловская	Bulvar Dmitriya Donskogo
Ulitsa Skobelevskaya	Улица Скобелевская	
Bulvar Admirala Ushakova	Бульвар Адмирала Ушакова	
Ulitsa Gorchakova	Улица Горчакова	
Buninskaya Alleya	Бунинская аллея	

== Rolling stock ==
The line shares the Varshavskoe depot (No. 8) with the Serpukhovsko-Timiryazevskaya line. Specially built class 81-740/741 (Rusich) trains serve this line. These were designed for outdoor operation. A total of 12 three-car trains are currently assigned.

== Recent developments and future plans ==
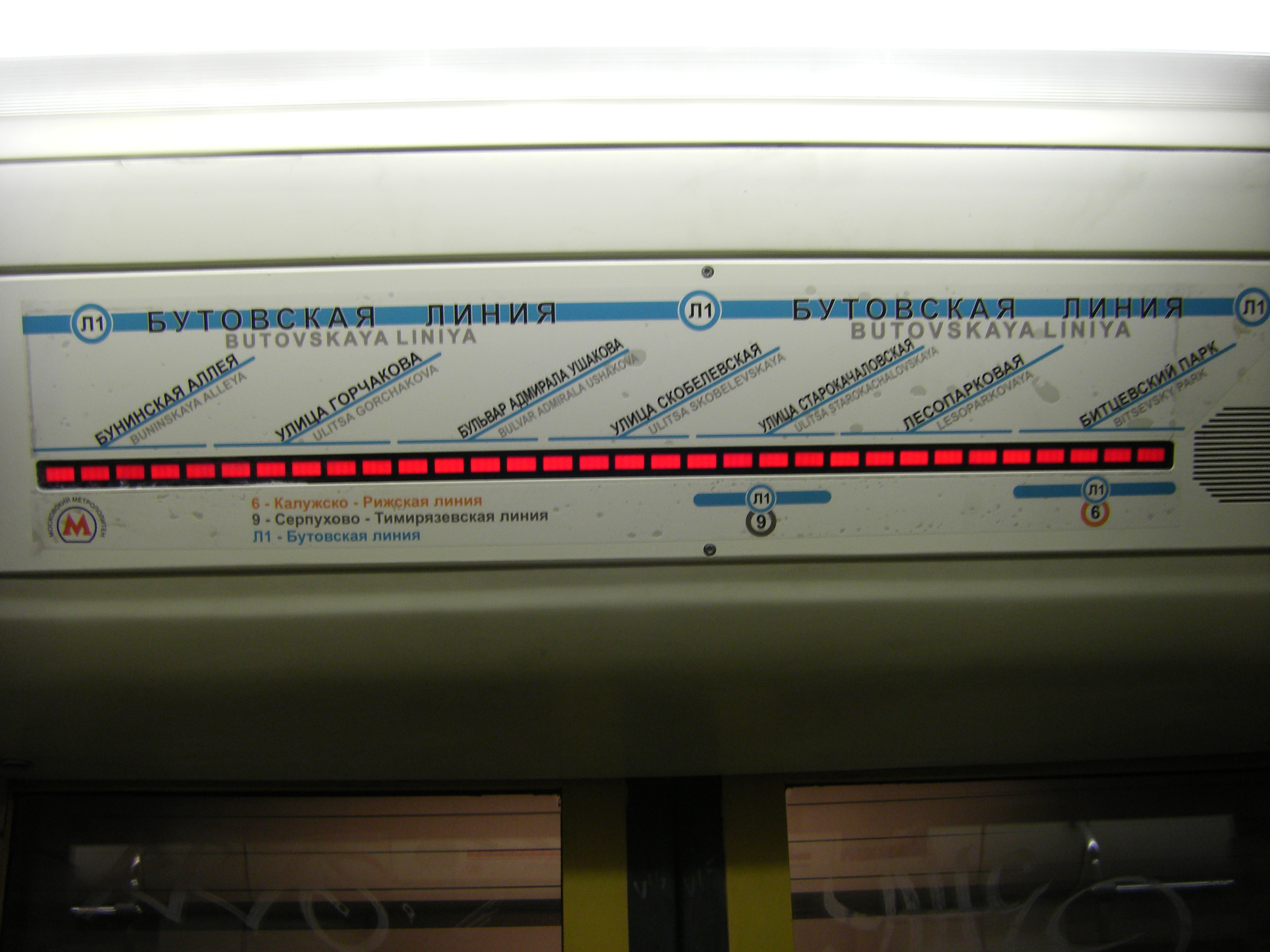
Linear map of Butovskaya line in 81-740/741 train in Moscow Metro

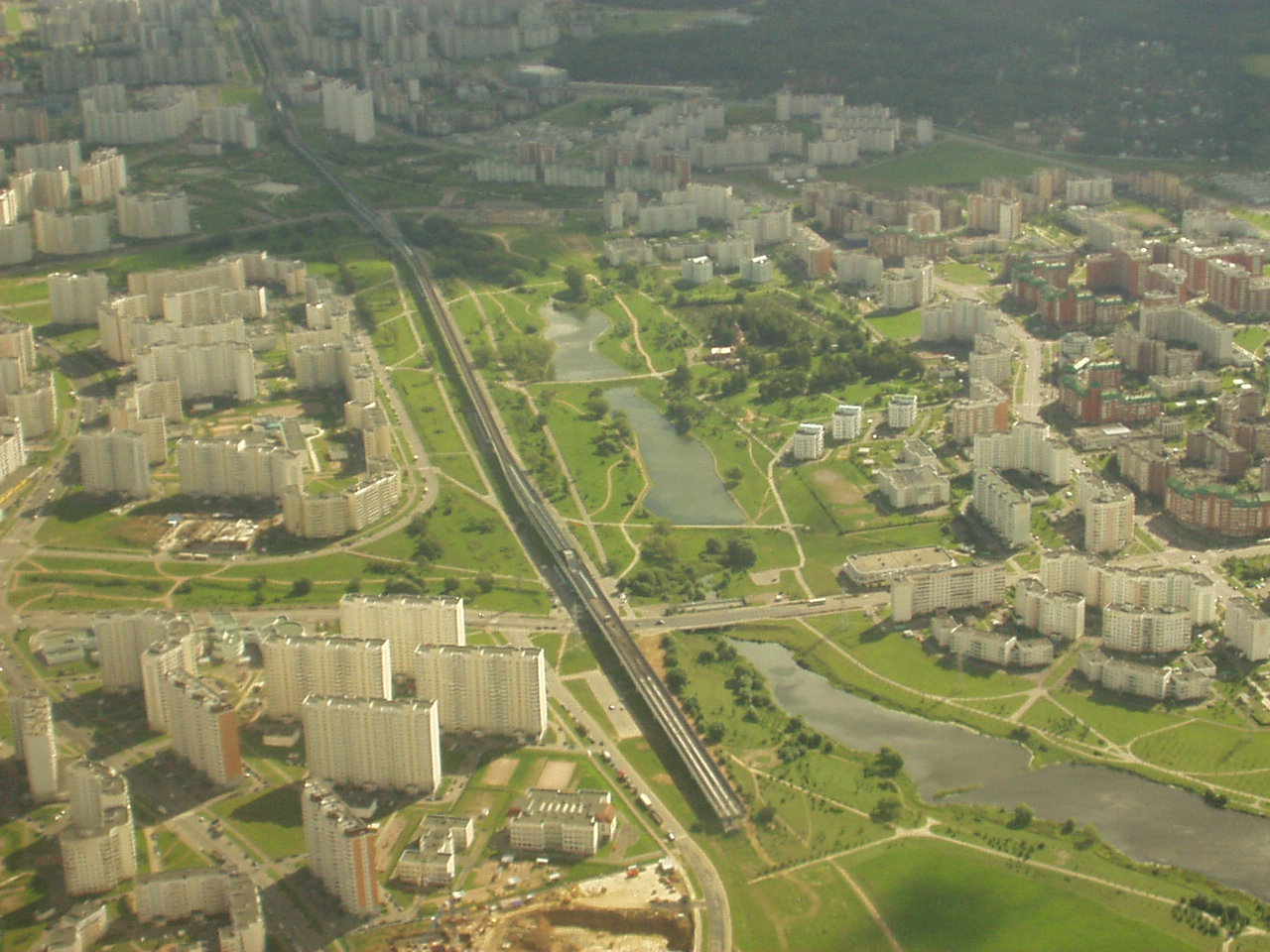
Southern terminus.

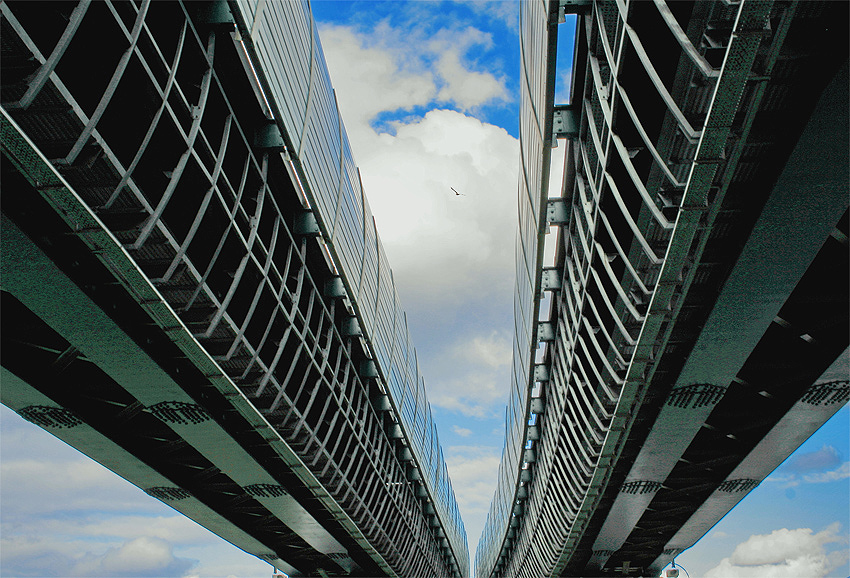
Flyover carrying the line.

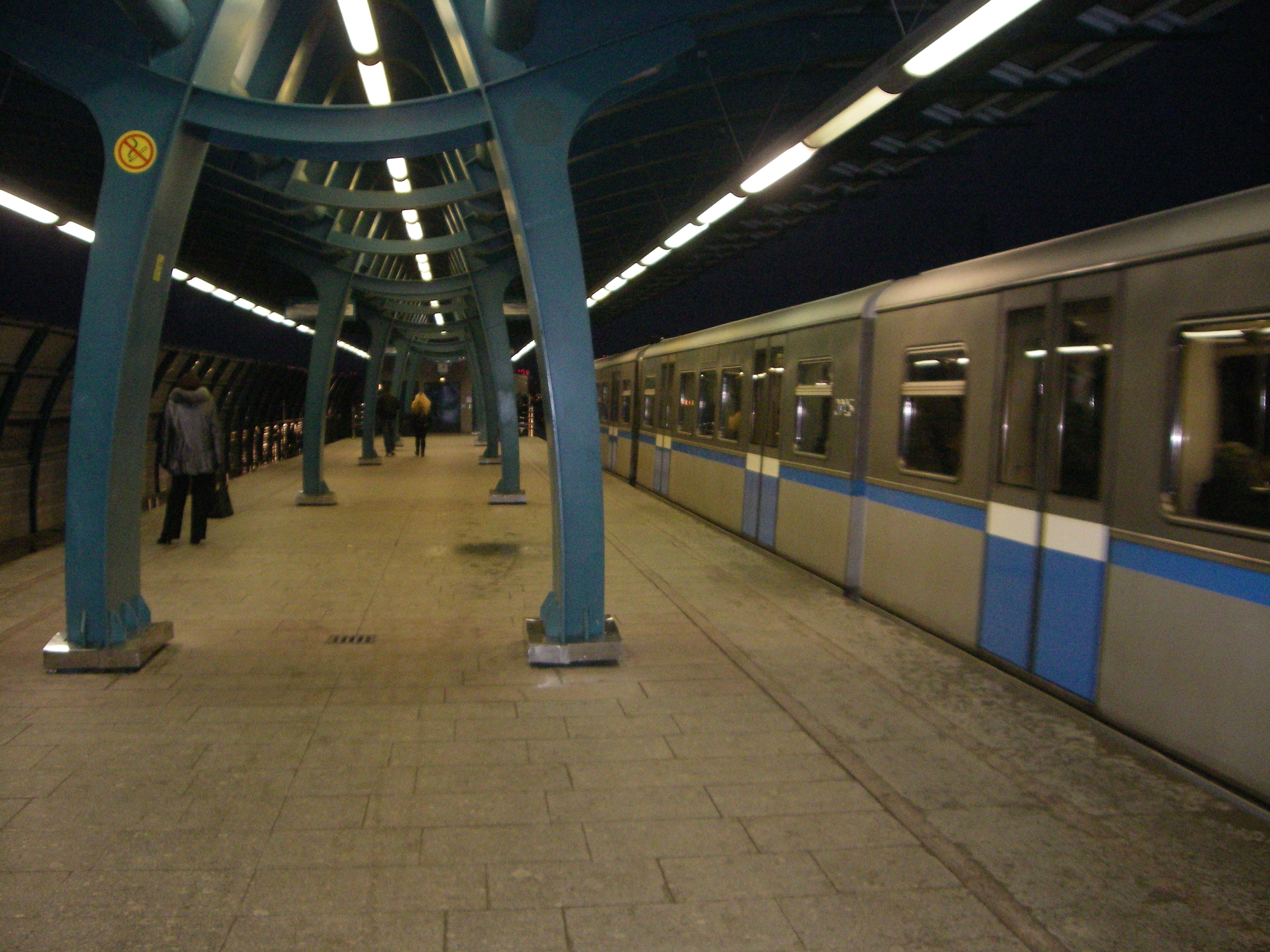
Typical overground station

Although the light metro was indeed innovative, it also received its share of criticism from different social groups and the media, which could well affect its future.

The main problems arose from finances, as the design was originally planned to be cost-saving; however, the BLLM turned out to be more expensive than conventional Metro lines. Passenger discomfort arose from shorter trains and larger intervals, but in particular from the transfer at Ulitsa Starokachalovskaya/Bulvar Dmitriya Donskogo, where the light metro station consists of two separated platforms on either side of the main line with no reversal sidings behind it. As a result, passengers must queue for lengthier times at a platform and also deal with exiting traffic before boarding their train. Additional problems arose from the landscape damage done by the flyover bridge.

Furthermore, costly and embarrassing improvements had to be made just a few months after opening. First, improvements had to be made to the faulty new trains, as they required immediate and unforeseen refits; in addition, despite the sound barriers, further noise reduction works had to be carried out on the tracks themselves by repairing their joints.

Despite the criticism, the Moscow Metro continues to put forward several expansion programs for the BLLM, the first one of which is to place proper reversal sidings north of the station thus separating the terminus platforms into northbound and southbound roles; at present this is announced for 2010. After the completion of that there was initially a planned northwestwards underground extension towards the terminus of the Kaluzhsko-Rizhskaya line, Novoyasenevskaya with two new stations: Lesoparkovaya and Bittsevsky Park, which opened on February 27, 2014. Since then Moscow Metro has postponed the project and even taken it off its list of primarily projects to be completed by 2015.

Cancelled plans of line south extension

A further three-station expansion to the southeast, as Butovo continues to grow, is proposed: Ulitsa Staropotapovskaya, Ulitsa Ostafyevskaya and Novokuryanovo, along with a new depot. The latter's construction might prove pivotal as it would allow for the line to become more independent in operation. On the map of new plans, the extension to Milizeysky poselok (or East Sherbinka) is planned with at least two stations. A transfer at Buninskaya Alleya to the Sokolnicheskaya line is planned after 2023.

The problems with the Butovo line have also affected the prospect of other light metro lines in general as the second planned line, the Solntsevskaya light metro line, has now been canceled. Its construction was planned to begin in 2004, with the line expected to open in 2006, but after repeated postponements, Moscow Metro decided that it would be more practical to revert to an older project – a conventional, Kalininsko-Solntsevskaya line. After the SL's cancellation, there have been concerns that BL's fate could be much worse, as there are arguments that it would be more practical to disassemble the line and replace it with two-three station extension of the STL.

Despite the shortcomings, one positive aspect of the BL is that the 81-740/741 trains, serial production of the rolling stock, have gained wider usage and are now dominant on the Filyovskaya line, having replaced all of the older trains and is now growing its share of the Arbatsko-Pokrovskaya line.

== See also ==
- Light metro
