= Gorchakova =

Gorchakova is a surname. Notable people with the surname include:

- Galina Gorchakova (born 1962), Russian opera singer
- Larisa Gorchakova (born 1964), Russian swimmer
- Yelena Gorchakova (1933–2002), Soviet athlete

== See also ==
- Gorchakov
- Ulitsa Gorchakova, Moscow Metro station
