= Yasenevo (Moscow Metro) =

Moscow Metro station

Yasenevo Ясенево
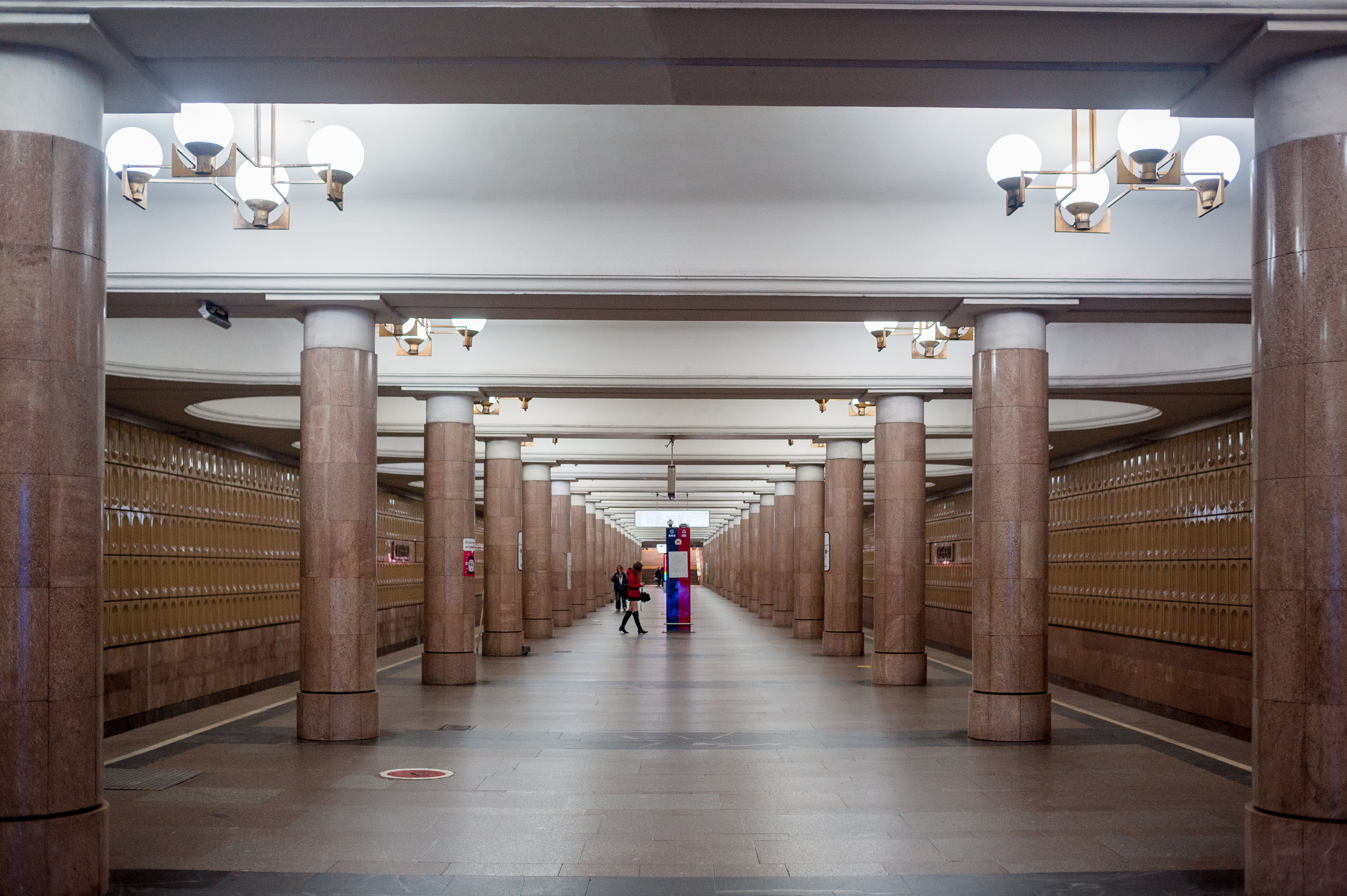

General information
- Location: Yasenevo District; South-Western Administrative Okrug; Moscow; Russia
- Coordinates: 55.6063°N 37.5333°E
- System: Moscow Metro station
- Owner: Moskovsky Metropoliten
- Line: Kaluzhsko-Rizhskaya line
- Platforms: 1
- Tracks: 2
- Connections: Bus: 165, c14, 264, 261, 262, 639, 642, 642к, c977, 648, 769, 912, т81, т85, н16.

Construction
- Depth: 8 metres (26 ft)
- Platform levels: 1
- Parking: Paid parking

Other information
- Station code: 108

History
- Opened: 17 January 1990; 36 years ago

Passengers
- 2002: 25,148,500

Services
Preceding station	Moscow Metro	Following station
Novoyasenevskaya Terminus	Kaluzhsko-Rizhskaya line	Tyoply Stan towards Medvedkovo
Route map
Location
- Location within Moscow Metro

Yasenevo (Russian: Ясенево) is a station on the Kaluzhsko-Rizhskaya Line of the Moscow Metro. It was designed by N. Shumakov, G. Mun, and N. Shurygina and opened on 17 January 1990.Yasenevo has round, greenish marble columns and walls faced with yellowish metallic tile and pink marble. The recessed oblong spaces between ceiling beams house chandeliers of a simple geometric design.

The entrances to the station are located under an intersection between Novoyasenevsky avenue, Tarusskaya street and Yasnogorskaya street.

== Gallery ==
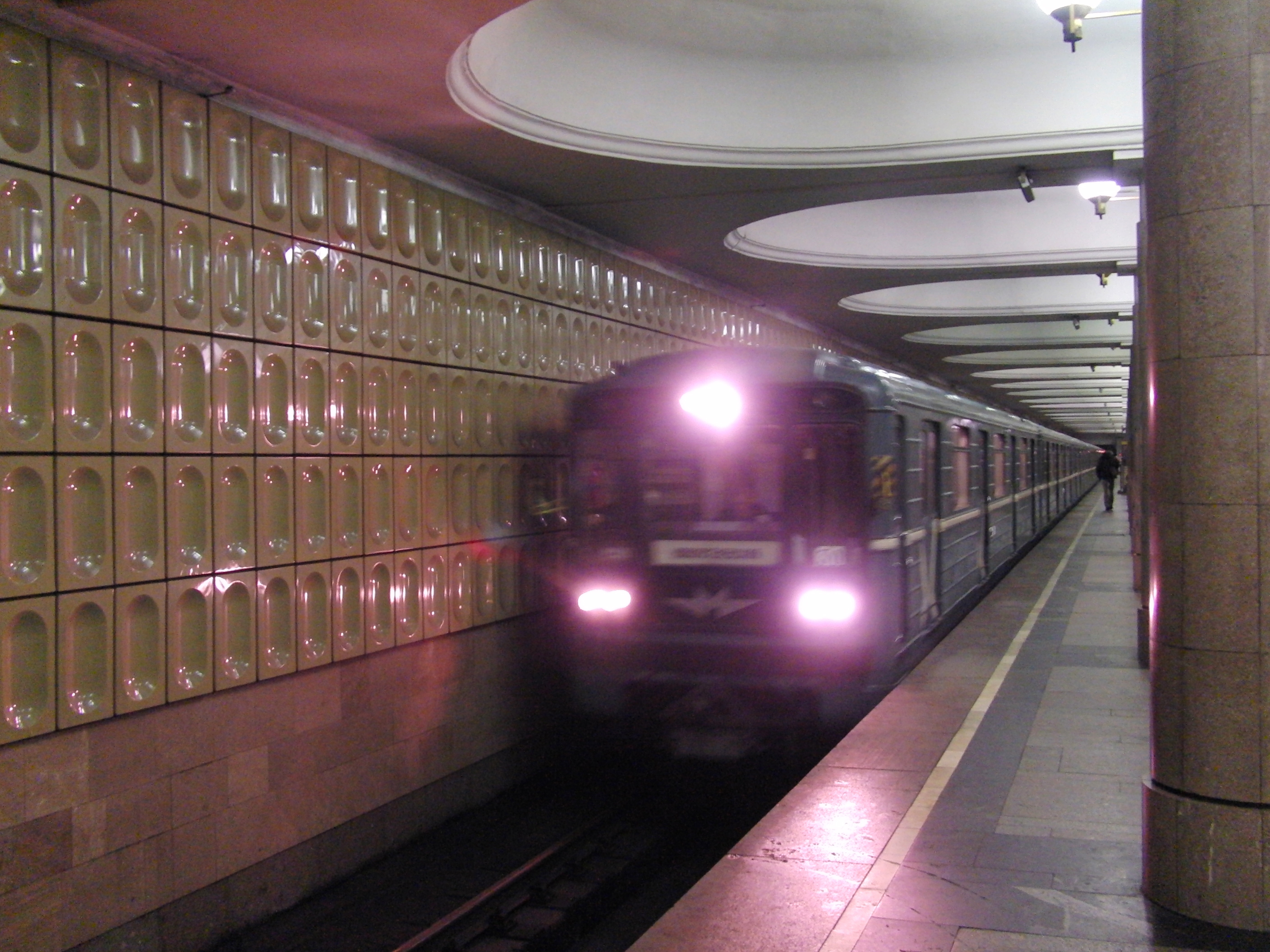
81-717/714 arriving at Yasanevo

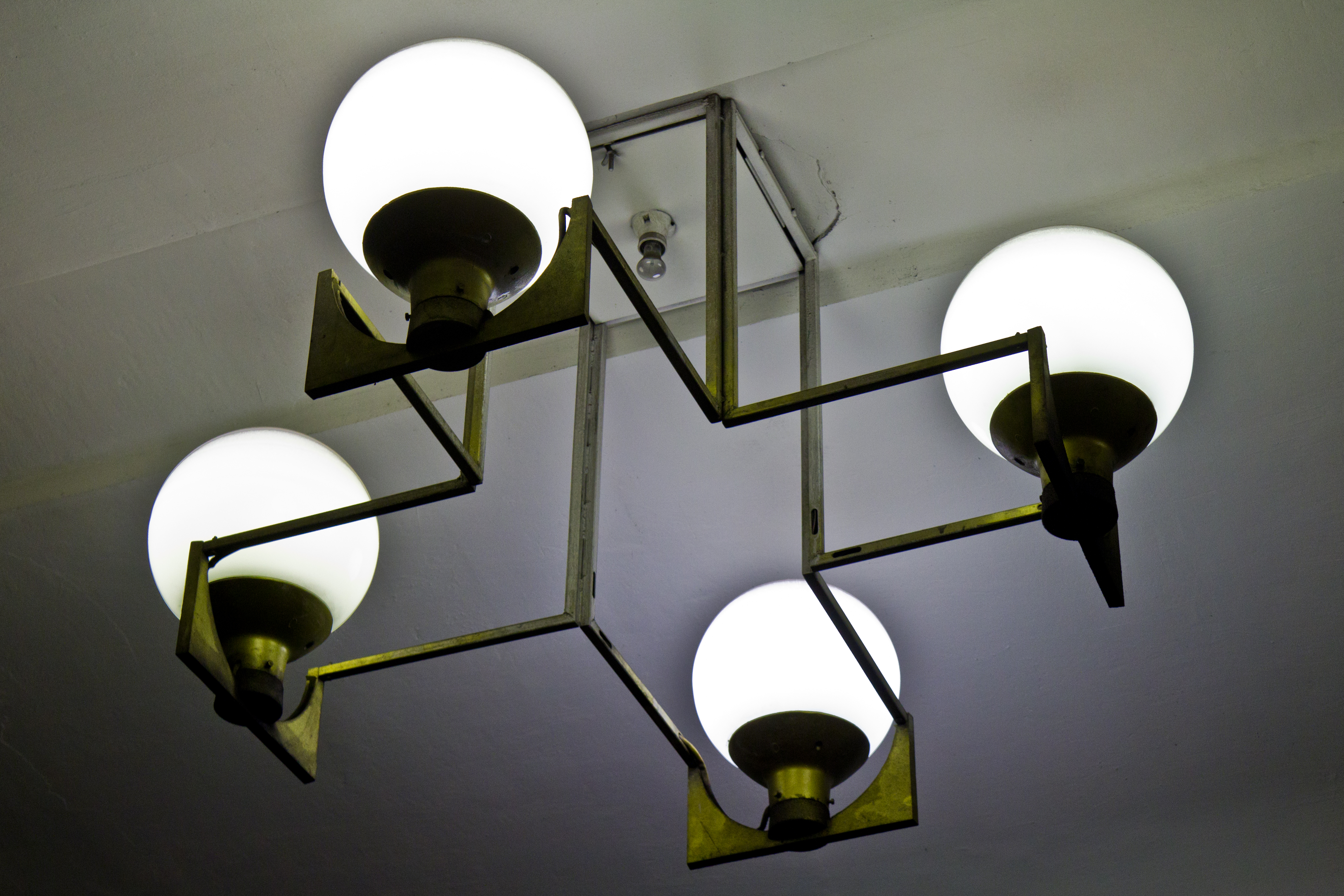
Lighting fixtures

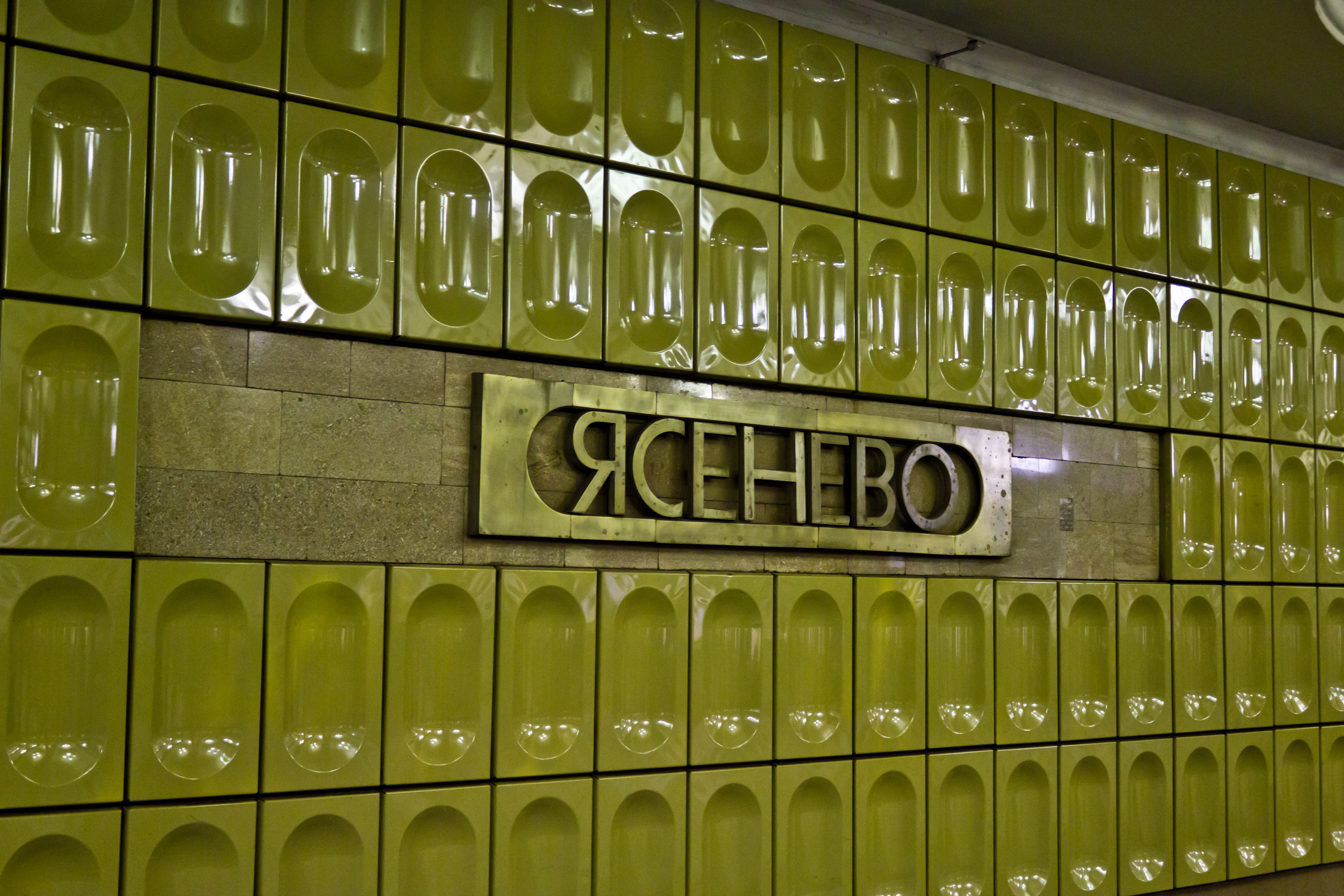
Artwork on platform

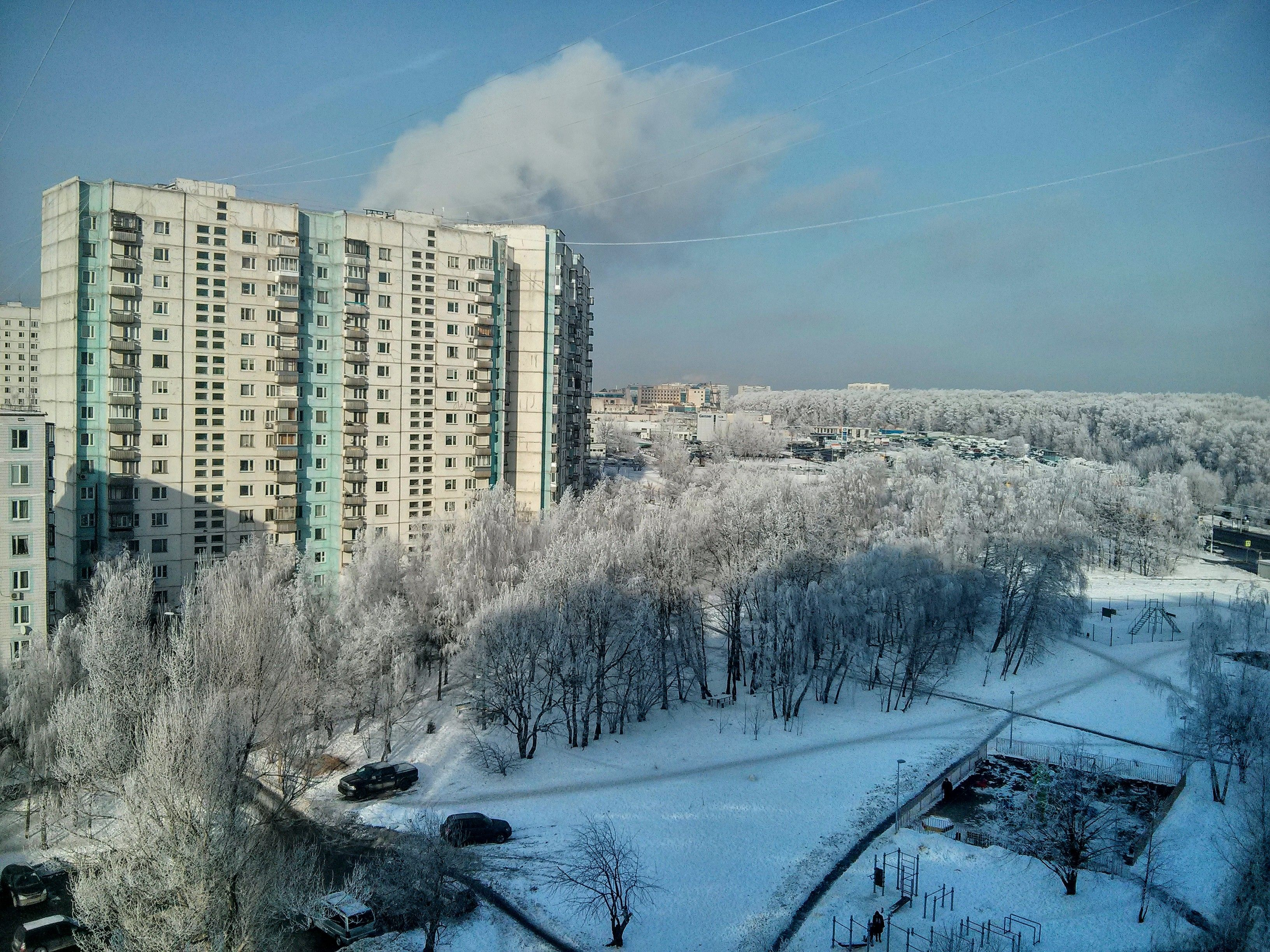
Apartment buildings outside Yasenevo station, during winter time
