= Lesoparkovaya =

Moscow Metro station

Lesoparkovaya Лесопарковая
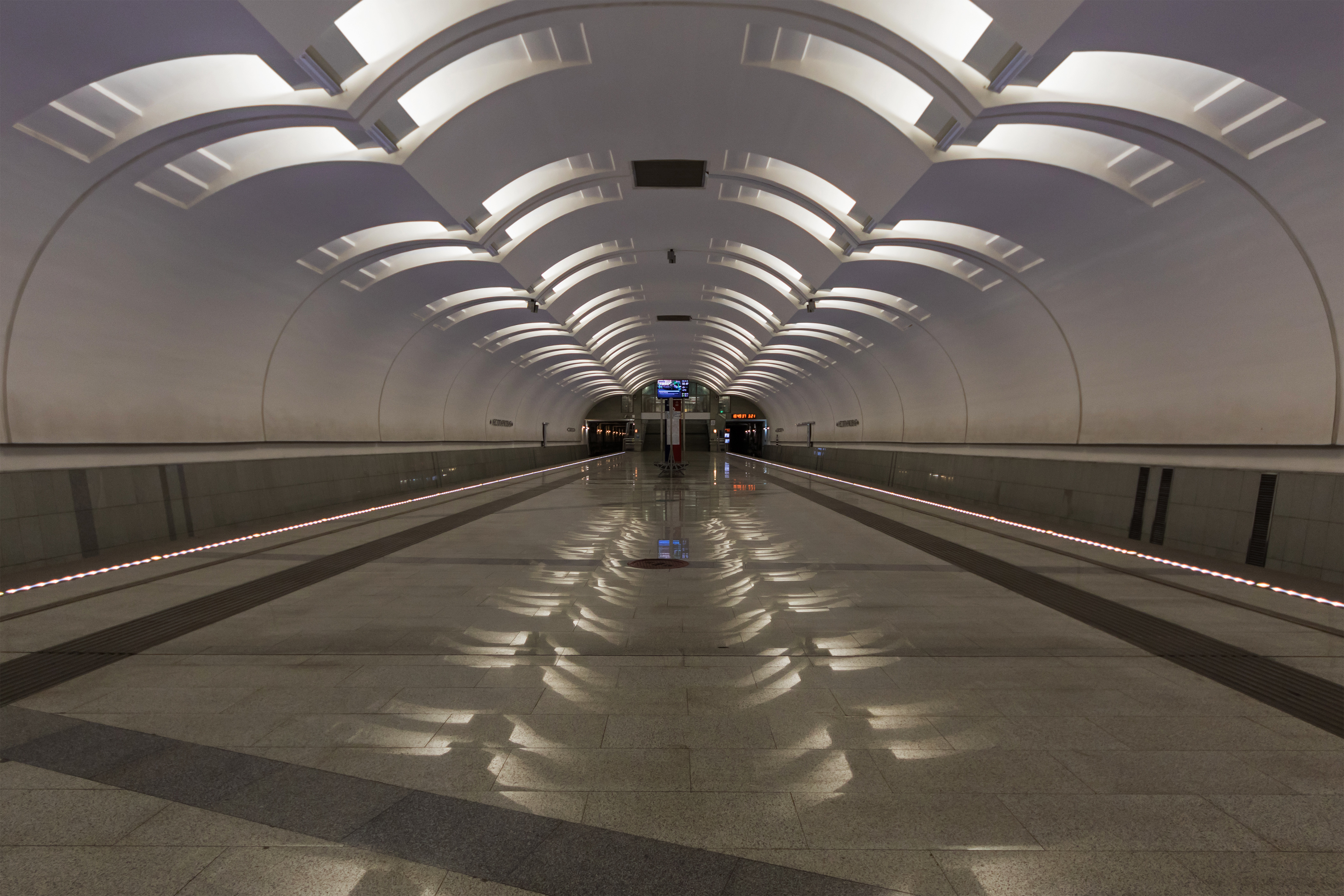

General information
- Location: Chertanovo Yuzhnoye District; Southern Administrative Okrug; Moscow; Russia
- Coordinates: 55.5821°N 37.5769°E
- System: Moscow Metro station
- Owner: Moskovsky Metropoliten
- Line: Butovskaya line
- Platforms: 1 island platform
- Tracks: 2

Construction
- Structure type: Shallow single-vault station
- Platform levels: 1
- Parking: No
- Accessible: yes

History
- Opened: 27 February 2014; 12 years ago

Services
Preceding station	Moscow Metro	Following station
Bittsevsky Park Terminus	Butovskaya line	Ulitsa Starokachalovskaya towards Buninskaya Alleya
Route map
Location
- Location within Moscow Metro

Lesoparkovaya (Russian: Лесопа́рковая) is a station on the Moscow Metro's Butovskaya Line, between Ulitsa Starokachalovskaya and Bittsevsky Park stations.

The station opened for revenue service on 27 February 2014.

== Location ==
Lesoparkovaya's location is parallel with the MKAD motorway.

== Building ==
The station is shallow depth and has single-vault design with two vestibules at each end, which stairs connect to the platform.
