= Severnoye Butovo District =

- District
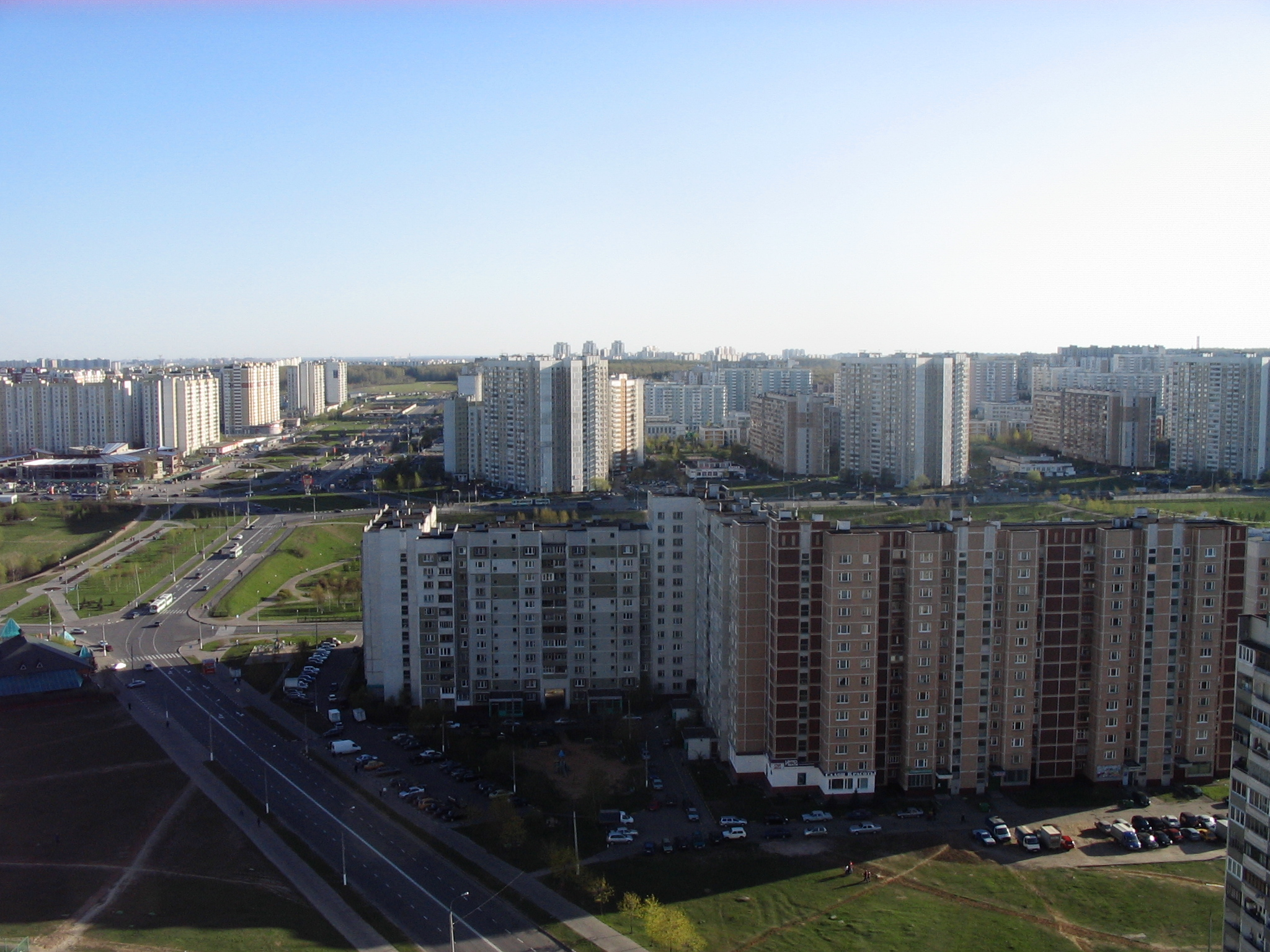
- Panorama of North Butovo, Severnoye Butovo District

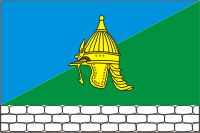
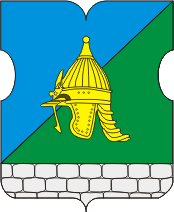
- Flag Coat of arms
- Location of Severnoye Butovo District on the map of Moscow
- Coordinates: 55°34′N 37°35′E
- Country: Russia
- Federal subject: Moscow

Area
  - Total: 9.271 km^{2} (3.580 sq mi)

Population
  - Estimate (2020): 95,937
- Time zone: UTC+
- OKTMO ID: 45906000
- Website: http://sevbutovo.mos.ru/

Severnoye Butovo District (Northern Butovo, Russian: Северное Бутово) is an administrative district (raion) of South-Western Administrative Okrug, and one of the 125 raions of Moscow, Russia. The area of the district is 9.271 square kilometers (3.580 sq mi). Population: 95,937 (2020 est.).

== See also ==
- Administrative divisions of Moscow
