= Yuzhnoye Butovo District =

- District
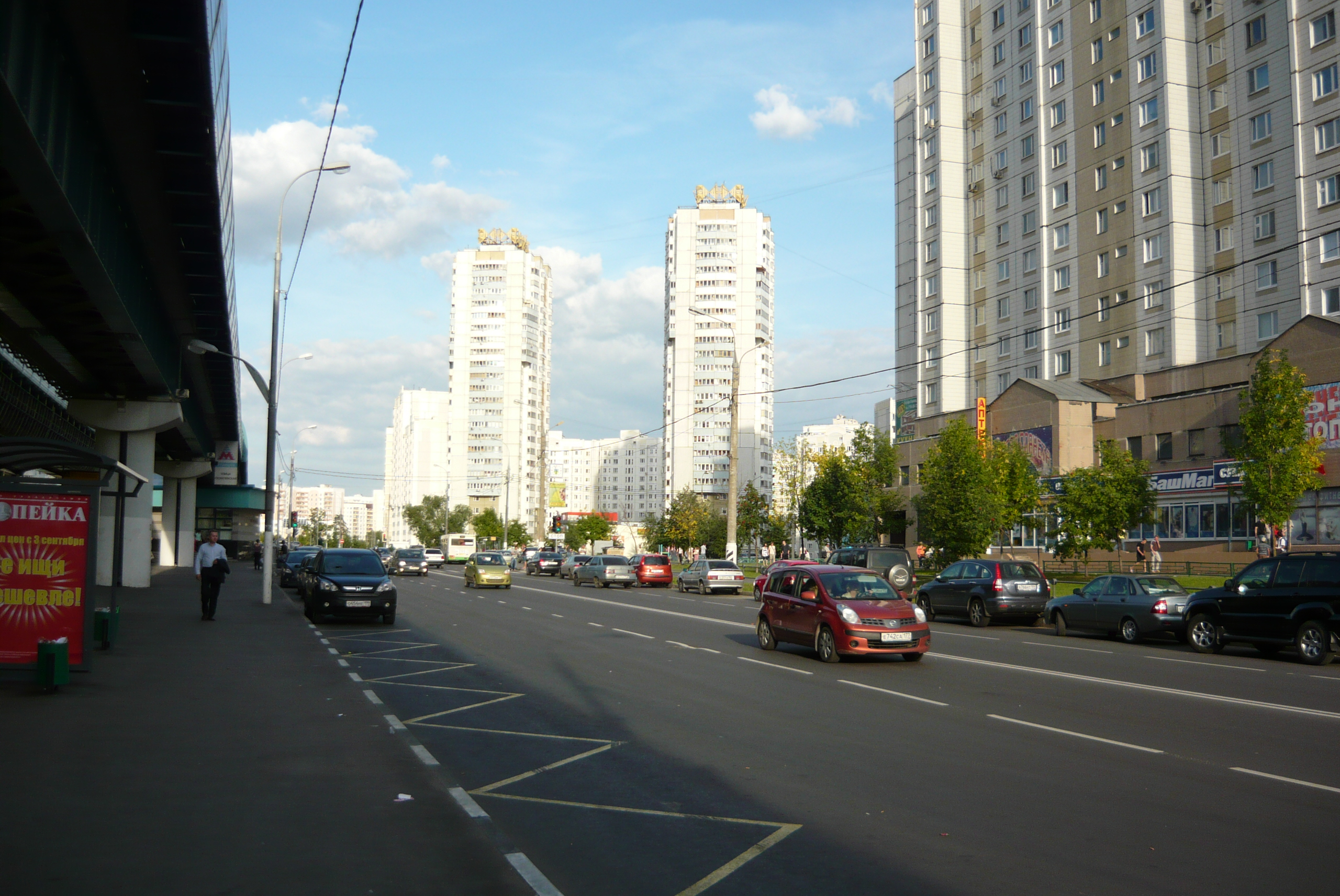
- Street scene, Yuzhnoye Butovo District

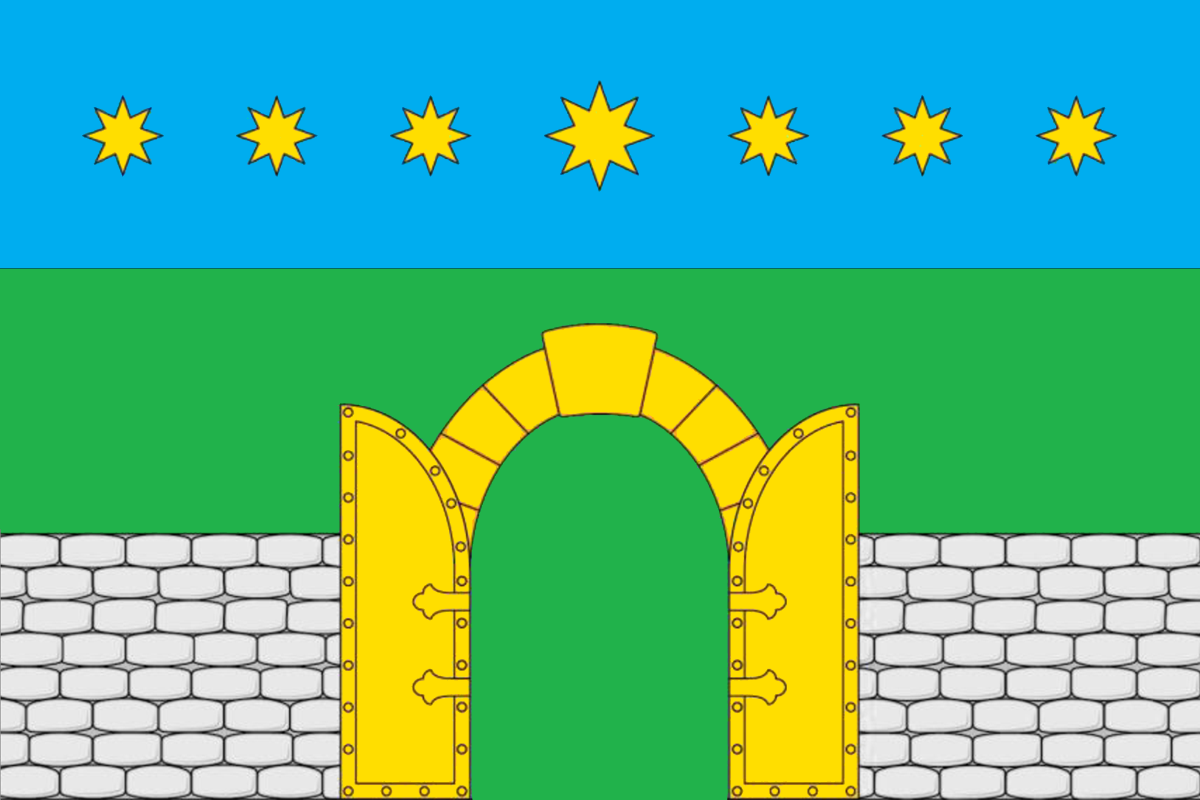
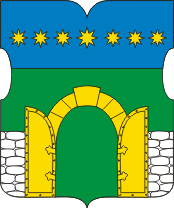
- Flag Coat of arms
- Location of Yuzhnoye Butovo District on the map of Moscow
- Coordinates: 56°N 38°E
- Country: Russia
- Federal subject: Moscow

Area
  - Total: 27 km^{2} (10 sq mi)

Population
  - Estimate (2016): 207,903
- Time zone: UTC+
- OKTMO ID: 45909000
- Website: http://ubutovo.mos.ru/

Yuzhnoye Butovo District (Southern Butovo, Russian: Ю́жное Бу́тово) is the biggest residential district in South-Western Administrative Okrug of Moscow, Russia. The district's history dates back to 1612, and it is named after a Don Cossack Butov. The area of the district is 27 square kilometres (10 mi^{2}). The population (July 2016) was 207,903.

== Butovo memorial ==
Situated approximately 27 km south-east of Moscow, Butovo is the site of the Butovo firing range, a mass grave dating from the "Great Purge" of the 1930s. In excess of 20,000 people were shot and buried there from August 1937 to October 1938 . It has become a shrine to Joseph Stalin's victims and has an Orthodox church on the grounds.
