= Bittsevsky Park (Moscow Metro) =

Moscow Metro station

Bittsevsky Park Битцевский парк
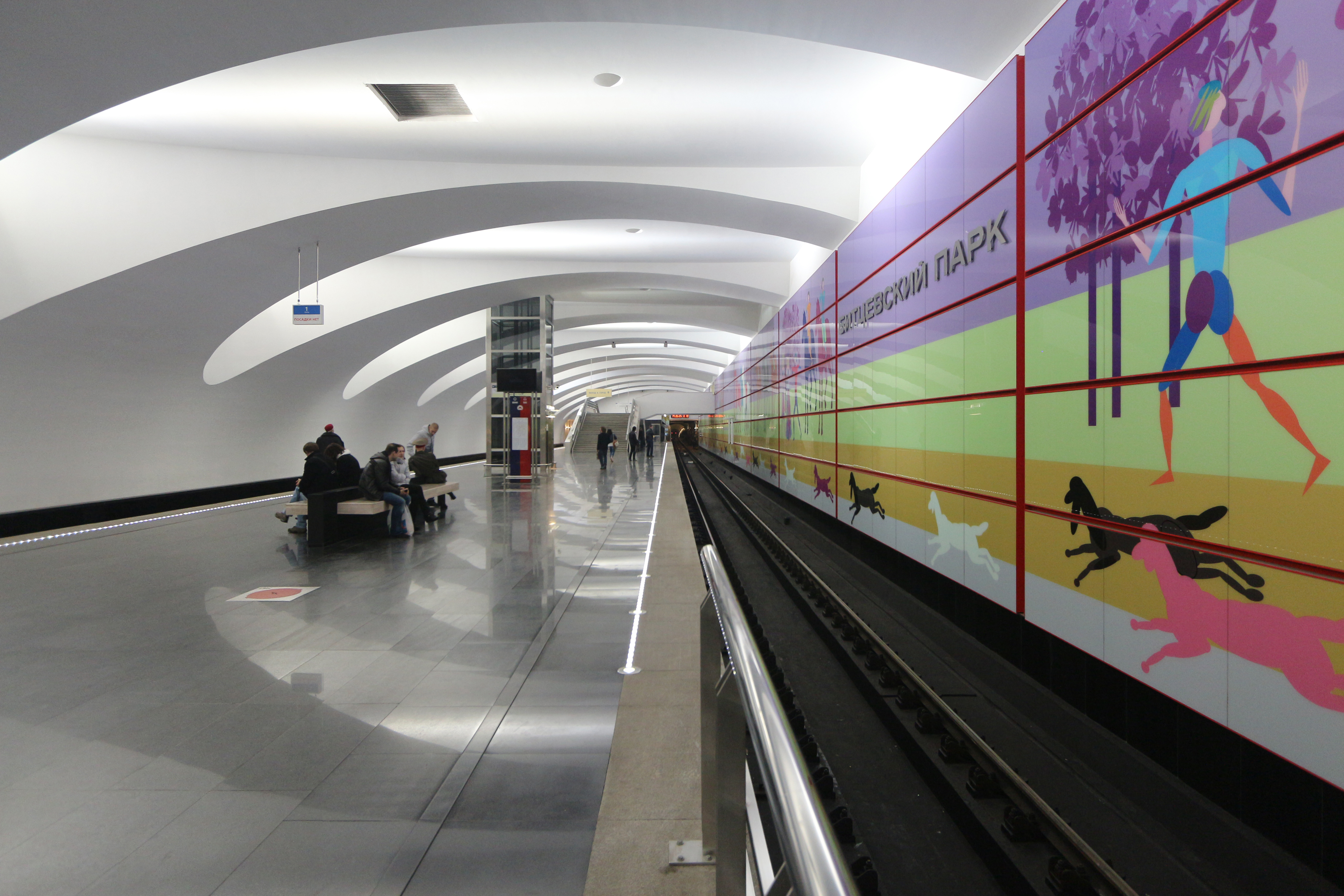

General information
- Location: Yasenevo District; South-Western Administrative Okrug; Moscow; Russia
- Coordinates: 55.6004°N 37.5562°E
- System: Moscow Metro station
- Owner: Moskovsky Metropoliten
- Line: Butovskaya line
- Platforms: 1 island platform
- Tracks: 2

Construction
- Structure type: Shallow single-vault
- Depth: 9.5 metres (31 ft)
- Platform levels: 1
- Parking: No
- Accessible: Yes

History
- Opened: 27 February 2014; 12 years ago

Services
Preceding station	Moscow Metro	Following station
Terminus	Kaluzhsko-Rizhskaya line transfer at Novoyasenevskaya	Yasenevo towards Medvedkovo
Terminus	Butovskaya line	Lesoparkovaya towards Buninskaya Alleya
Route map
Location
- Location within Moscow Metro

Bittsevsky Park (Russian: Би́тцевский парк) is a Moscow Metro station on the Butovskaya Line. The station opened on 27 February 2014.

== Location ==
The station is located in Yasenevo District in Moscow, Russia.

== Transfer ==
It is a transfer station, connected with Novoyasenevskaya station on the Kaluzhsko-Rizhskaya Line.
