= Buninskaya Alleya =

Moscow Metro station

Buninskaya Alleya Бунинская аллея
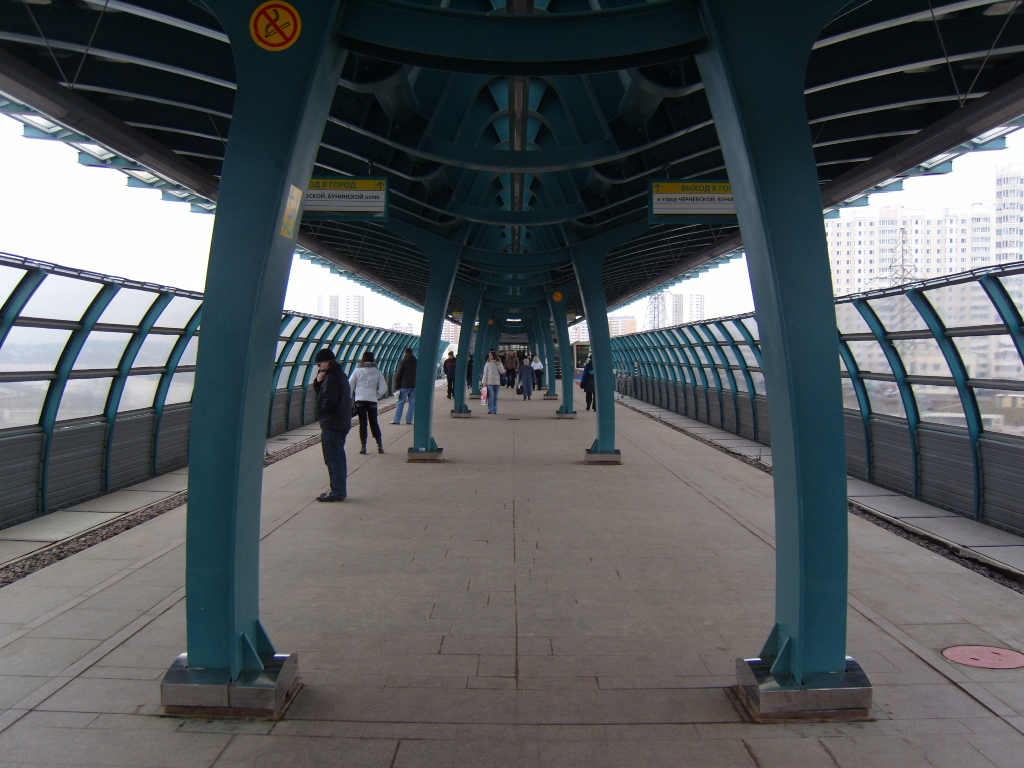

General information
- Location: Yuzhnoye Butovo District; South-Western Administrative Okrug; Moscow; Russia
- Coordinates: 55.5380°N 37.5158°E
- System: Moscow Metro station
- Owner: Moskovsky Metropoliten
- Line: Butovskaya line
- Platforms: 1
- Tracks: 2

Construction
- Platform levels: 1
- Parking: No
- Accessible: yes

Other information
- Station code: 195

History
- Opened: 27 December 2003; 22 years ago

Services
Preceding station	Moscow Metro	Following station
Ulitsa Gorchakova towards Bittsevsky Park	Butovskaya line	Terminus
Route map
Location
- Location within Moscow Metro

Buninskaya Alleya (Russian: Бу́нинская алле́я) is the southern terminus of the Butovskaya Line of the Moscow Metro, and the southernmost station of the entire system.

== Background ==
It was opened on 27 December 2003. Like most other stations of the line, it is located above the ground.

The station bears the name of a nearby street which is named after 20th century Russian writer Ivan Bunin. There is a possibility to extend the line further south beyond the Buninskaya Alleya station, but this had not been included into the extension programme until 2020.

As of 2024, the station remains the southernmost station in the Moscow Metro.
