= Moscow Metro =

Rapid transit system in Moscow

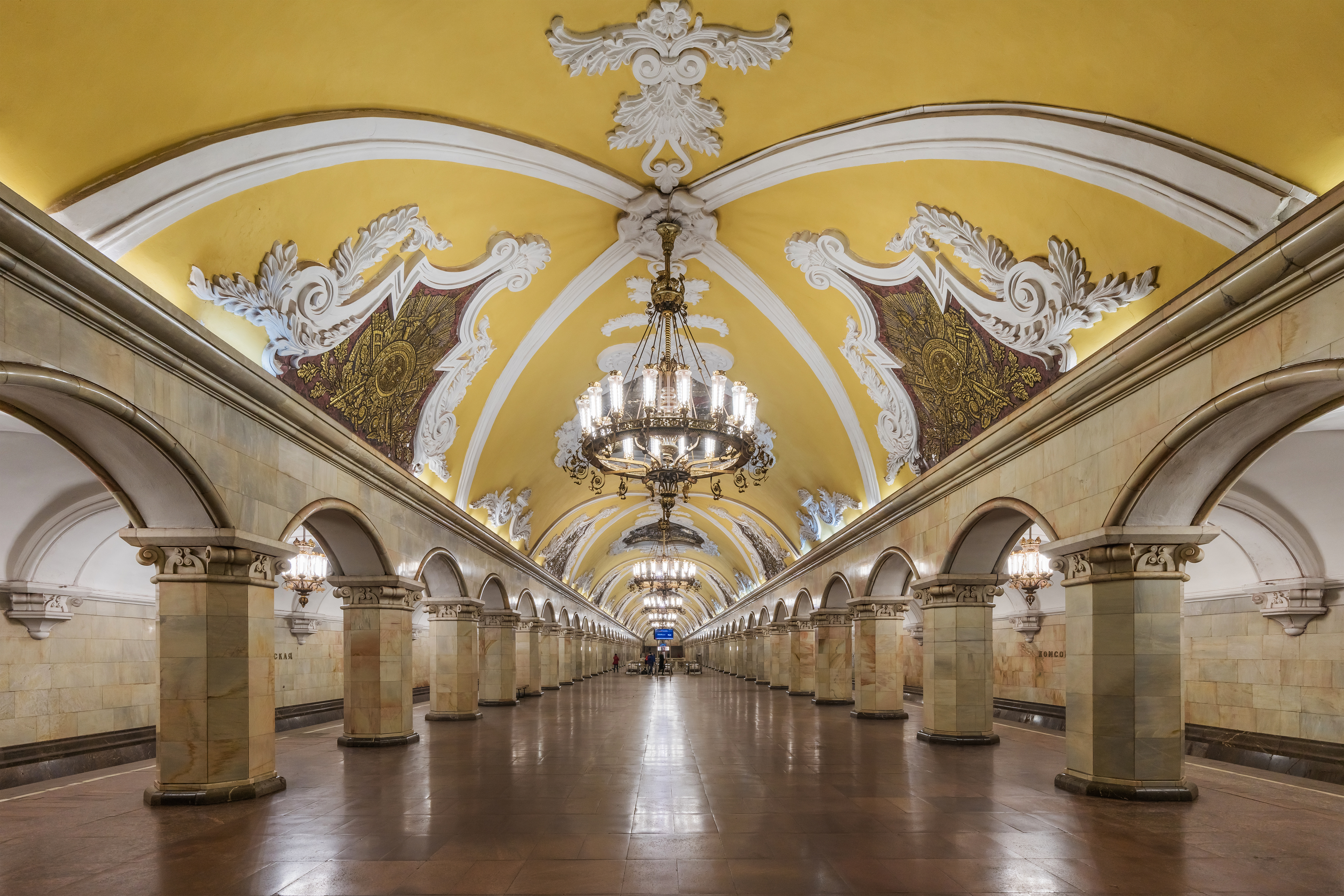
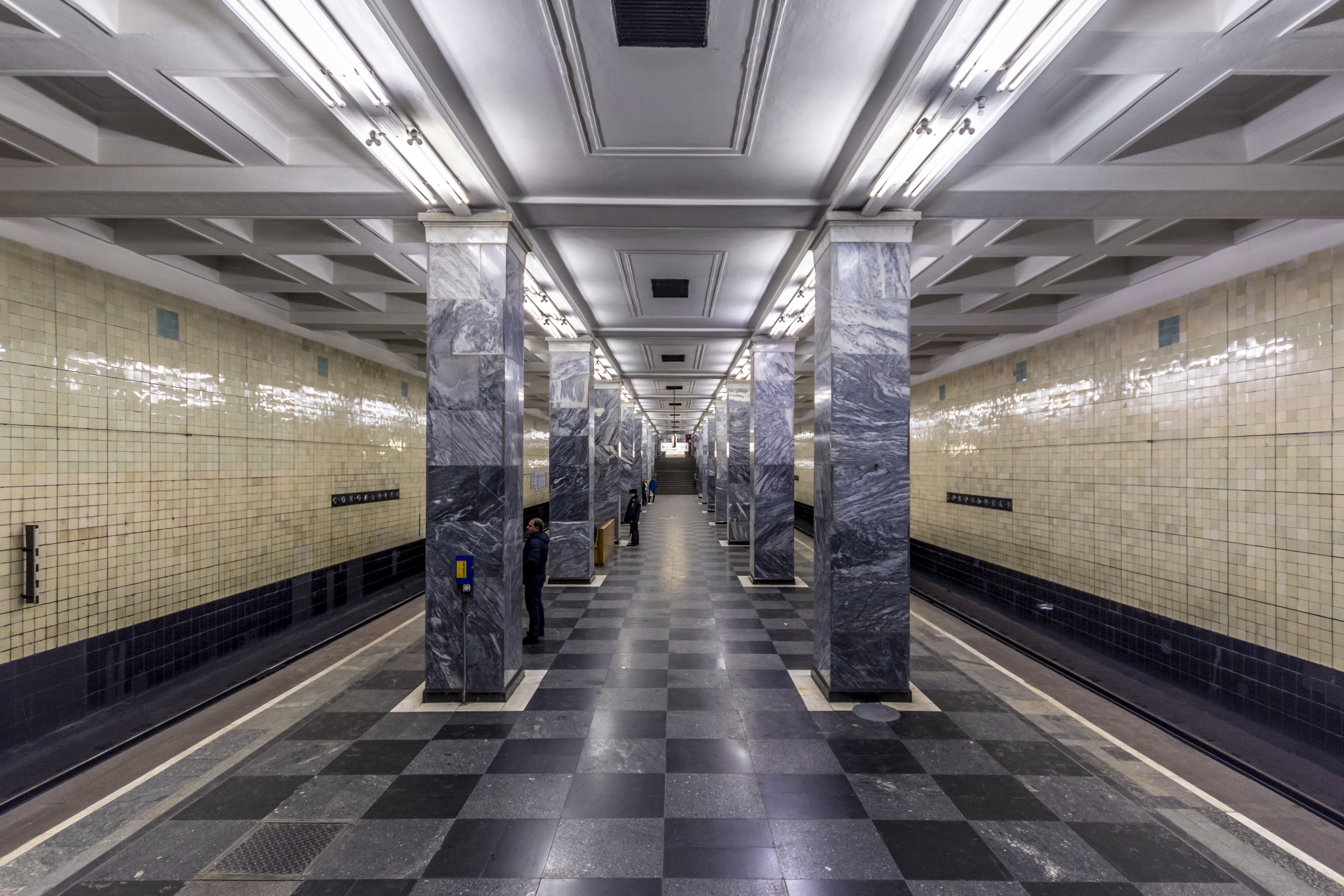
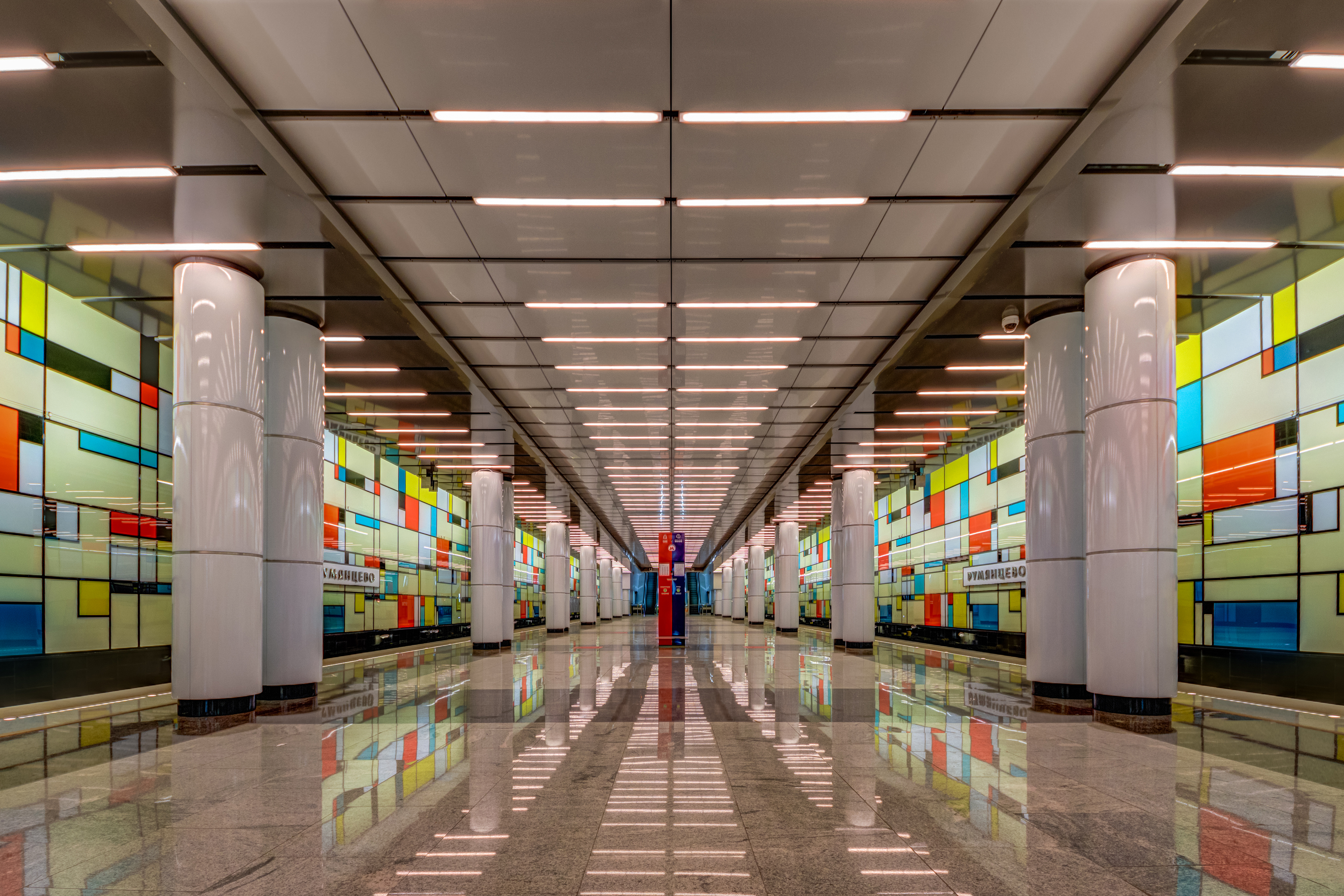
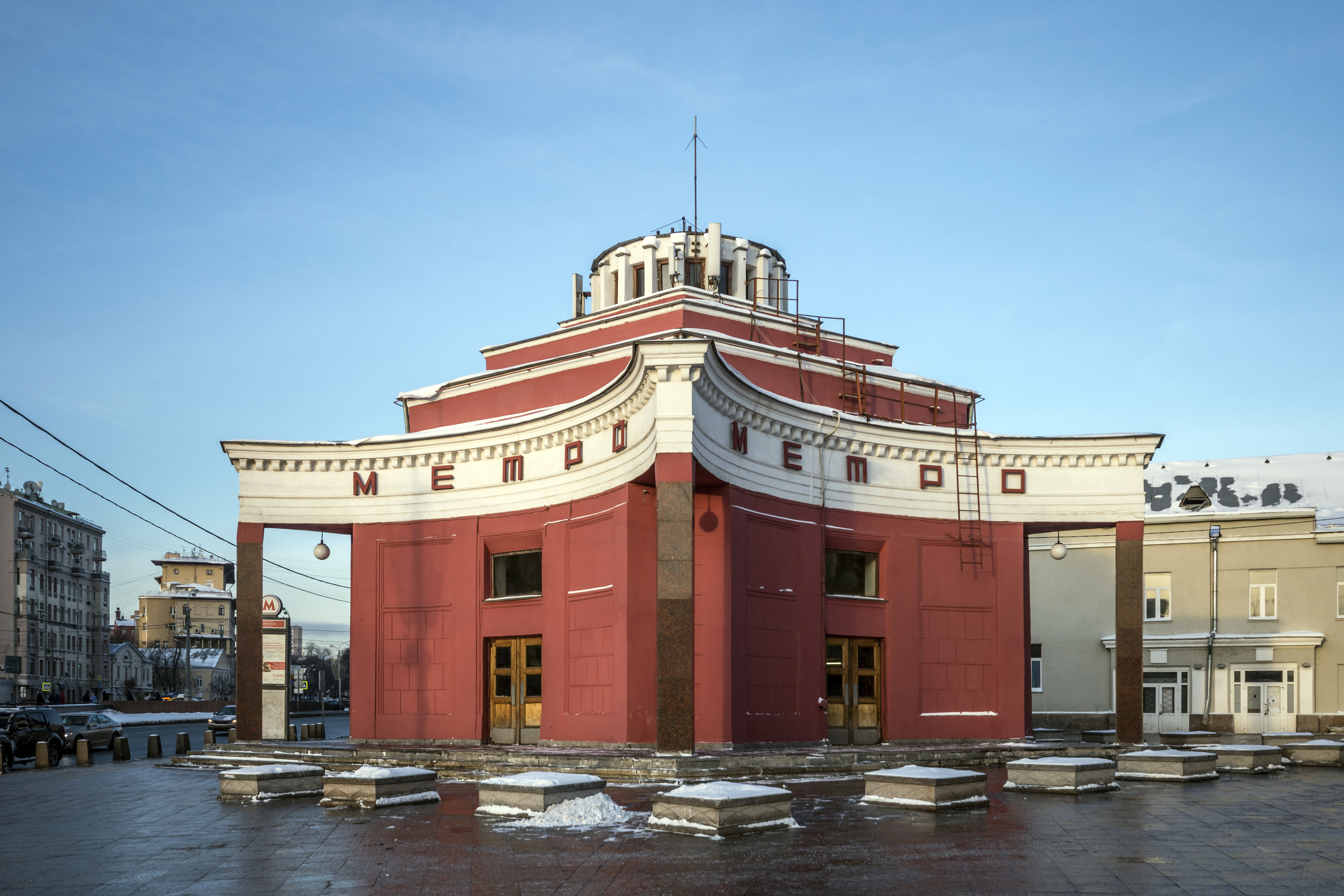
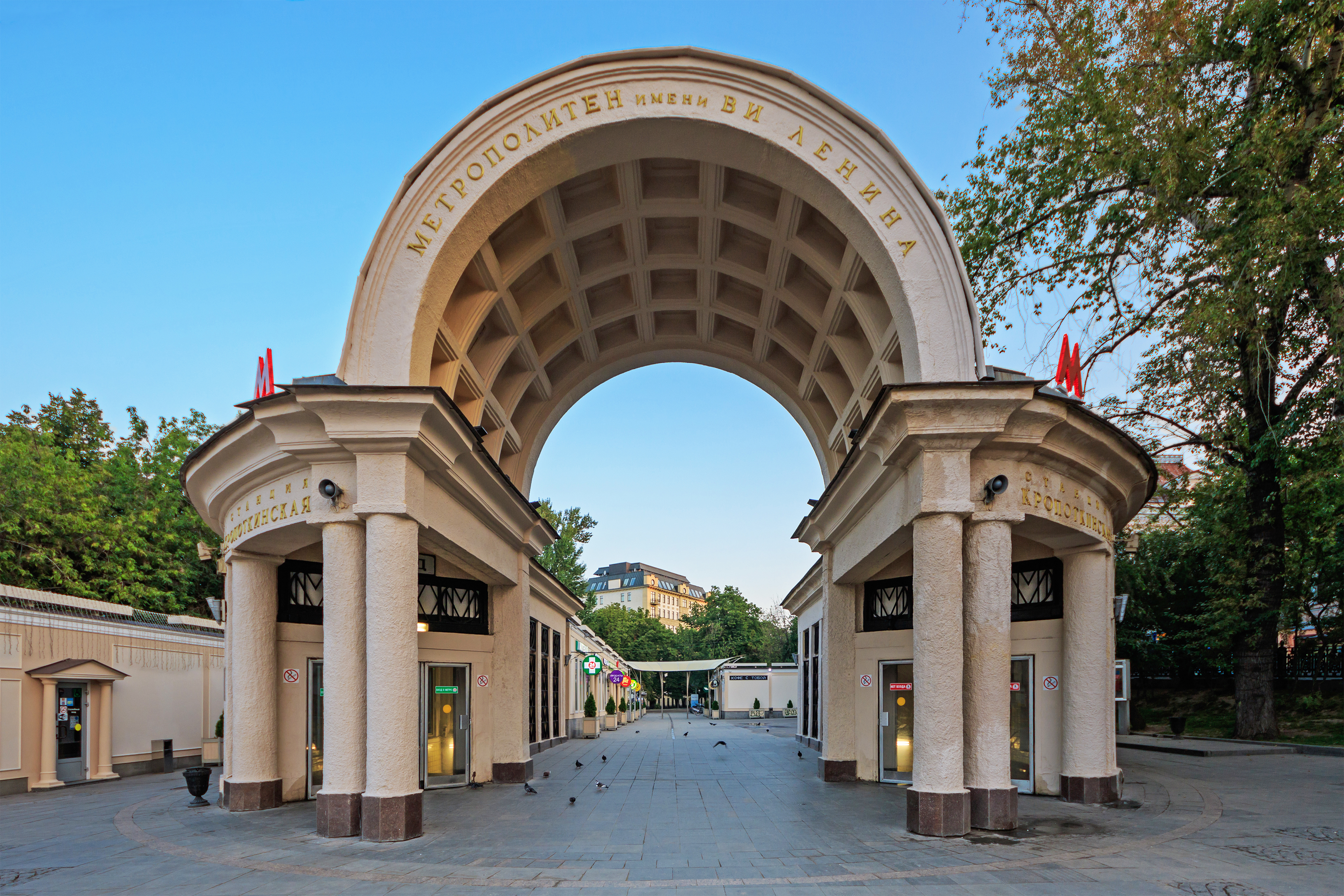
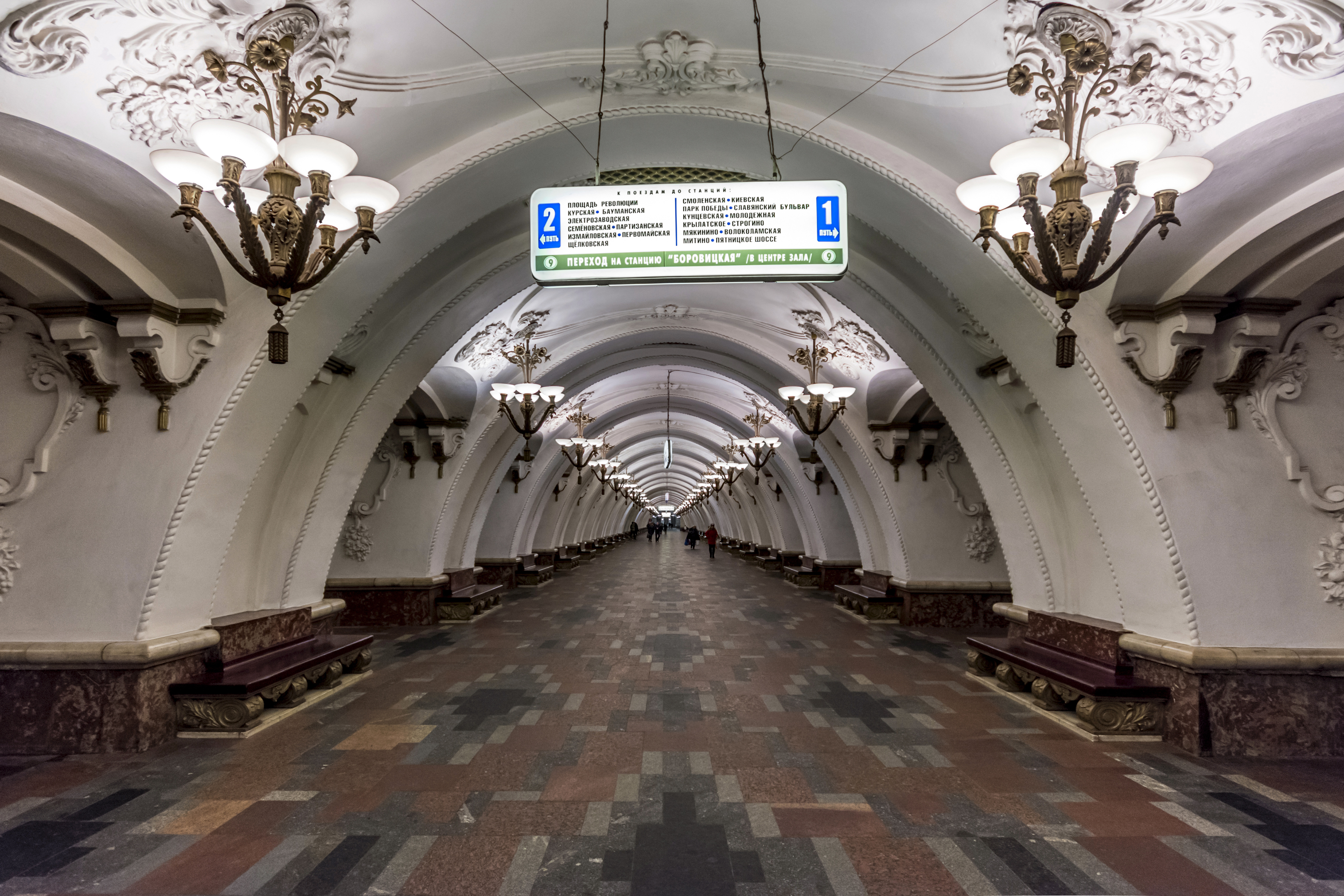
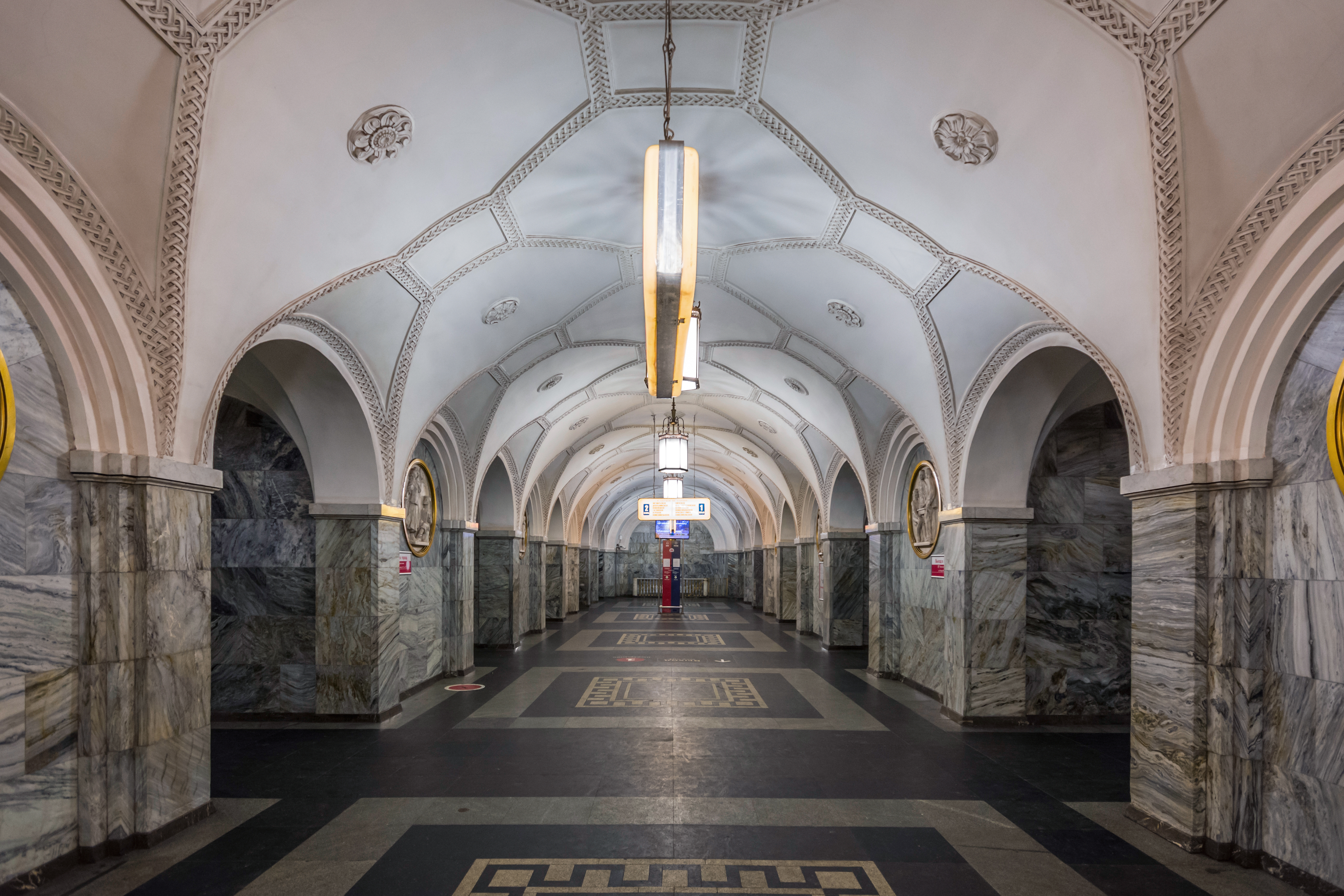
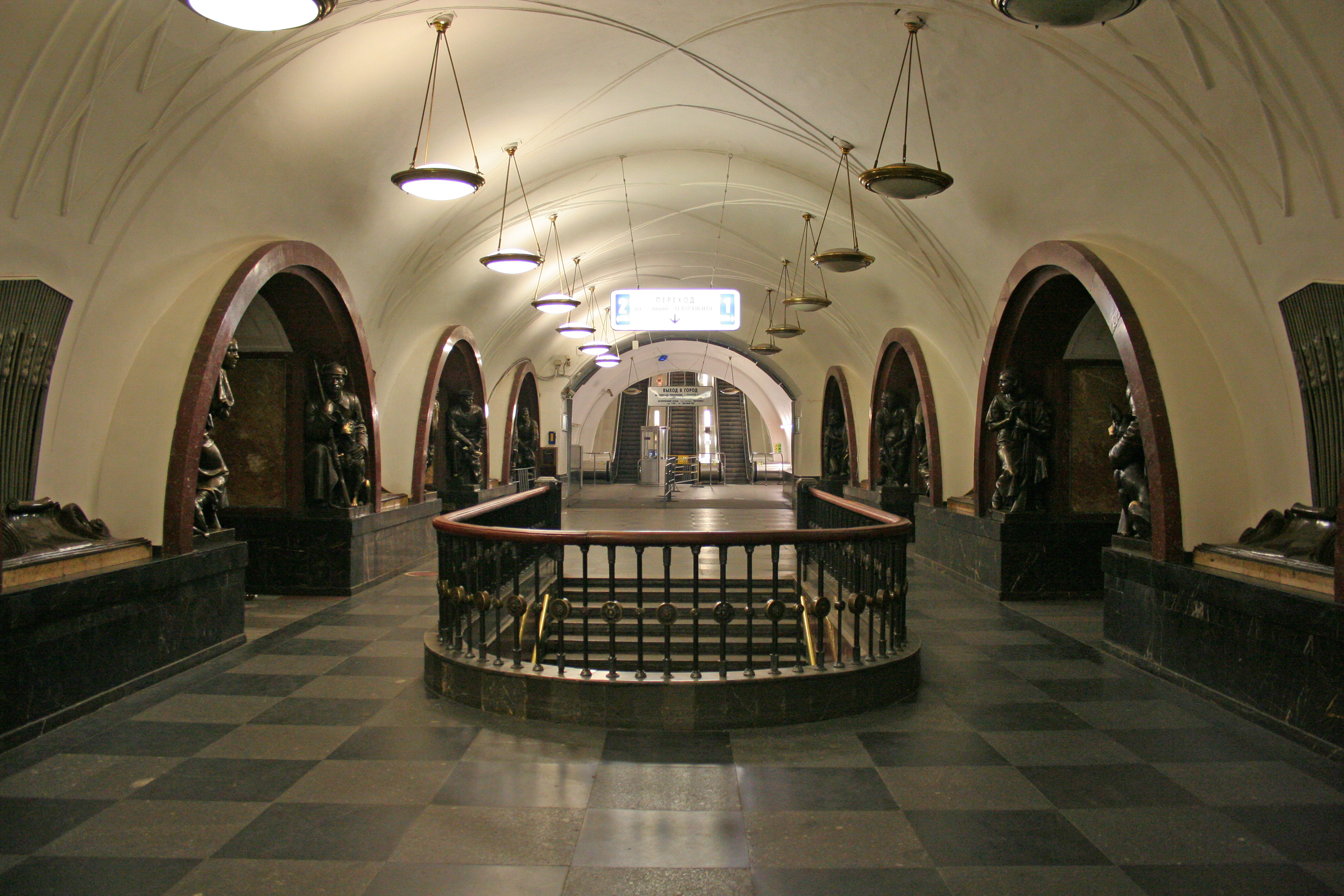
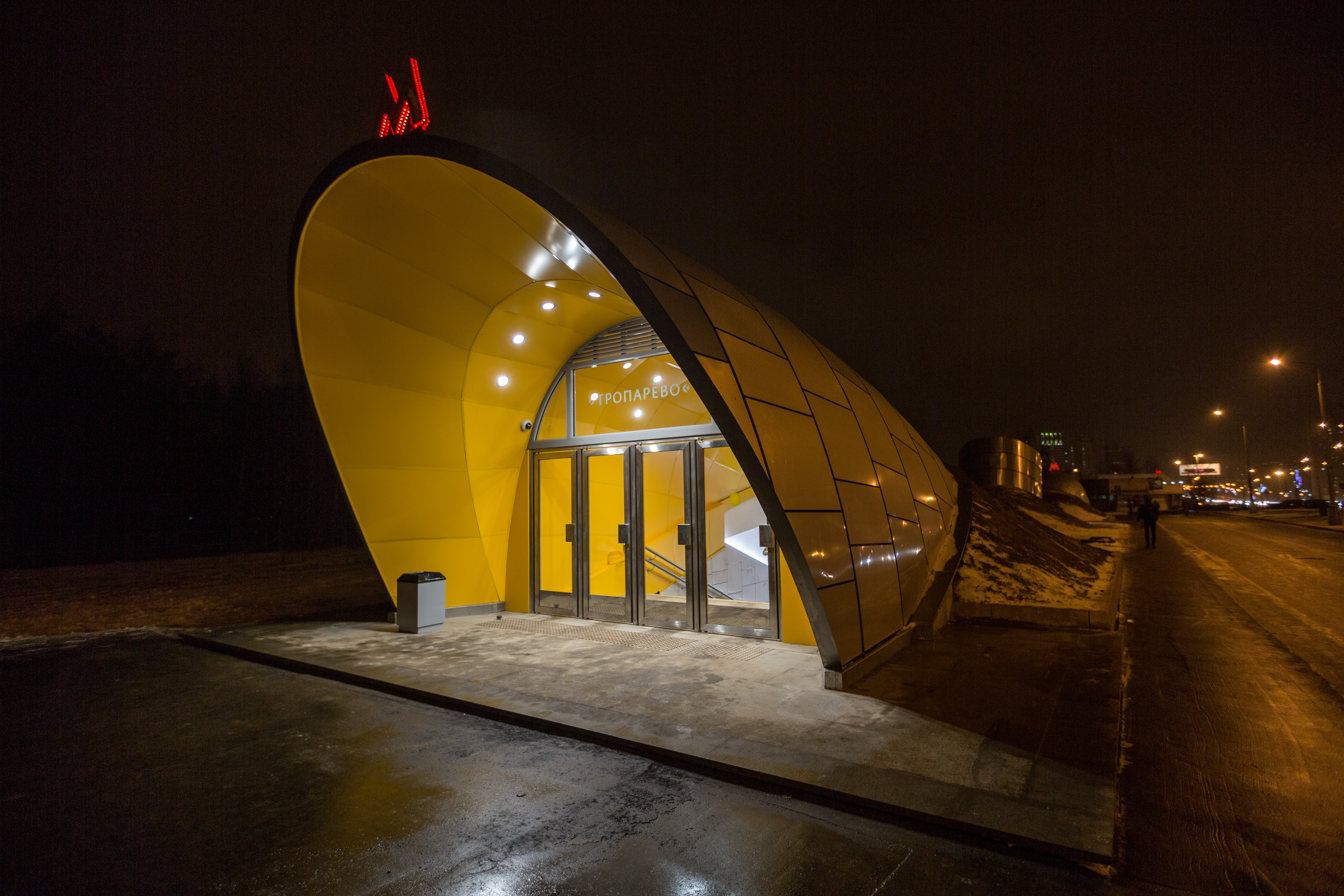
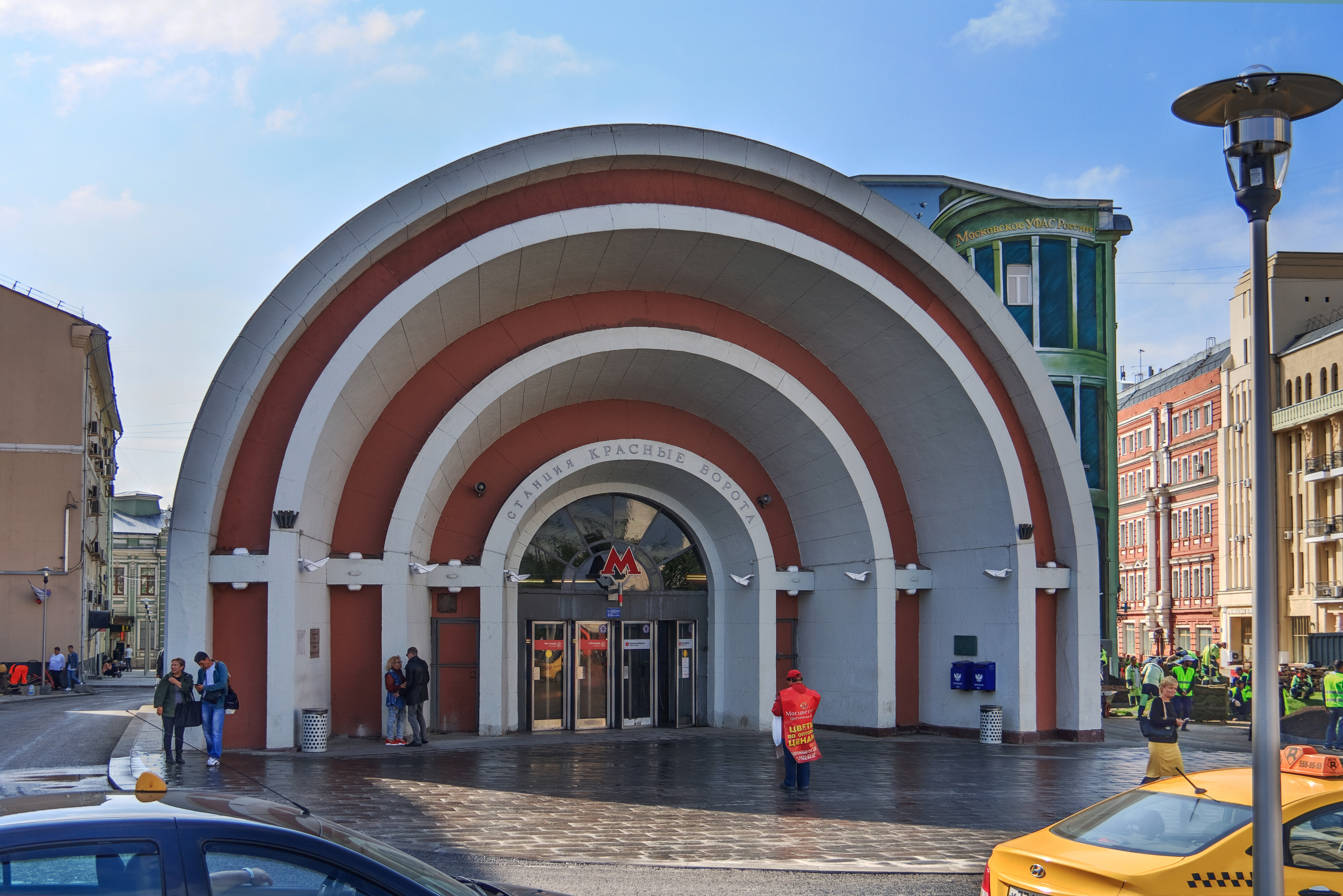
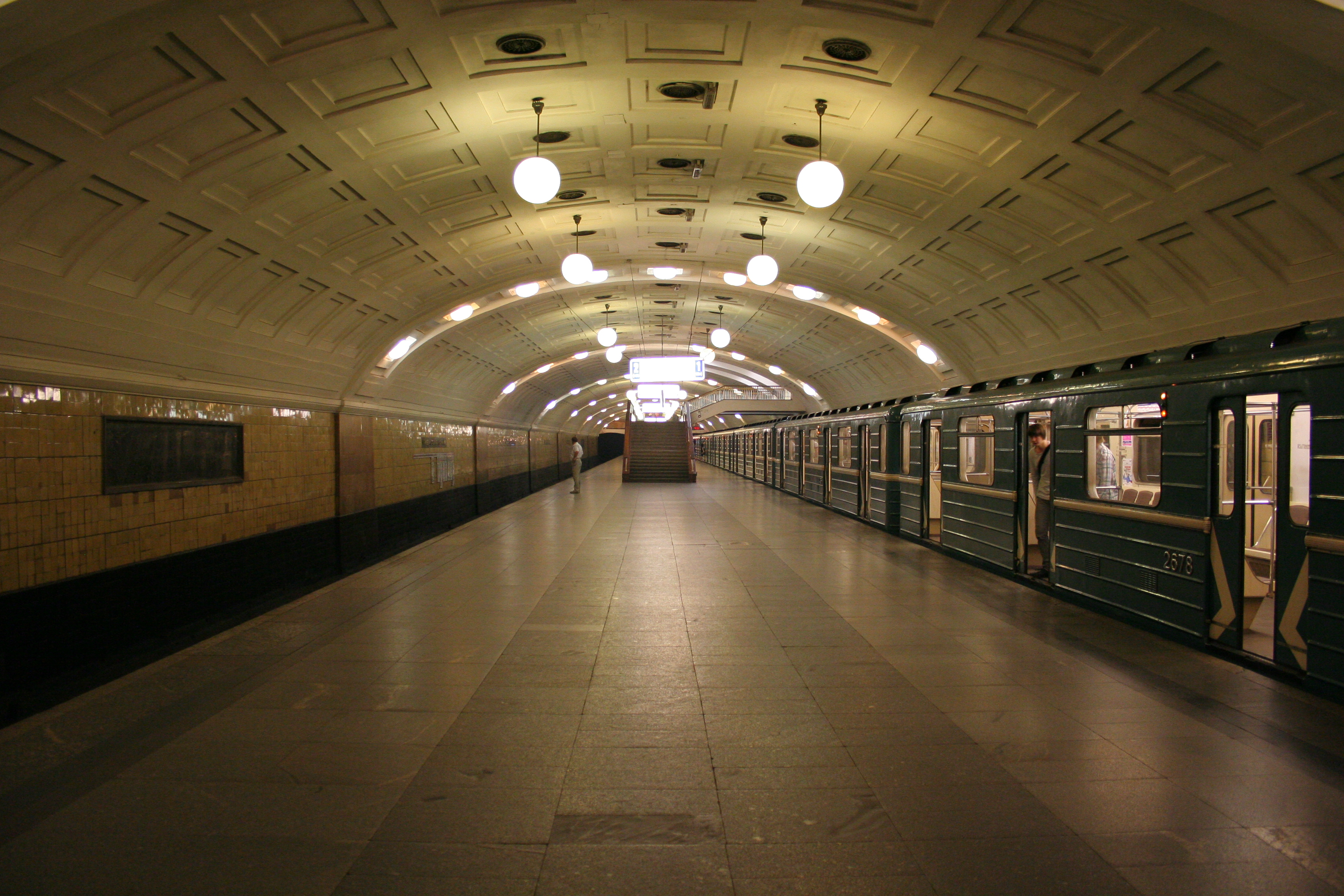
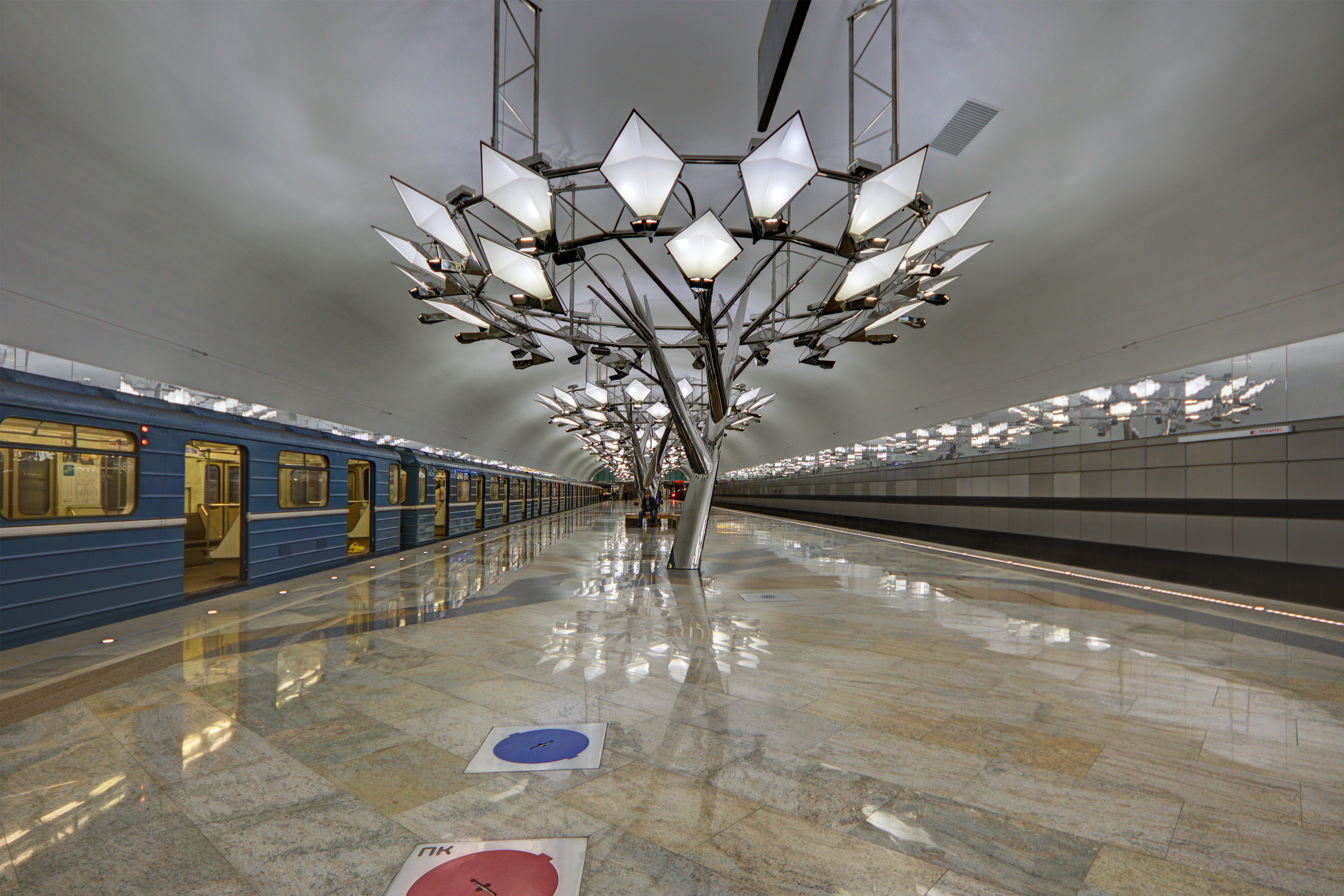

Overview
- Native name: Московский метрополитен имени В.И. Ленина
- Owner: Government of Moscow
- Area served: Moscow
- Locale: Federal city of Moscow and cities of Kotelniki, Krasnogorsk, Lyubertsy, Reutov in Moscow Oblast, Russia
- Transit type: Rapid transit
- Number of lines: 17
- Number of stations: 309
- Daily ridership: (average) 7.5 million (highest, 26 December 2014) 9.715 million
- Annual ridership: 2.5 billion (2018)
- Chief executive: Viktor Kozlovsky
- Website: mosmetro.ru

Operation
- Began operation: 15 May 1935; 91 years ago
- Operator: Moskovsky Metropoliten
- Headway: Peak hours: 1.5 - 1.7 mins Off-peak: 2.5 - 10 minutes

Technical
- System length: 541.9 km (336.7 mi)
- Track gauge: 1,520 mm (4 ft 11 27/32 in)
- Electrification: 825 volt DC third rail,
- Average speed: 39.54 km/h (24.57 mph)
- Top speed: 100 km/h (62 mph)
System map

The Moscow Metro (Note: Russian: Московский метрополитен, romanized: Moskovskiy metropoliten, IPA: [mɐˈskofskʲɪj mʲɪtrəpəlʲɪˈtɛn])) is a rapid transit system in the Moscow metropolitan area of Russia. It serves the capital city of Moscow and the neighbouring cities of Krasnogorsk, Reutov, Lyubertsy, and Kotelniki. Opened in 1935 with one 11-kilometre (6.8 mi) line and 13 stations, it was the first underground railway system in the Soviet Union.

As of September 2026, the Moscow Metro has 309 stations and 541.9 km (336.7 mi) of route length, making it the 8th-longest in the world, the longest in Europe and the longest outside China. It is also the only system in the world with three circle lines. The system is mostly underground, with the deepest section 73 m (240 ft) underground at the Park Pobedy station, one of the world's deepest underground stations. It is the busiest metro system in Europe, the busiest in the world outside Asia, and is considered a tourist attraction in itself, thanks to its lavish interior decoration.

The Moscow Metro is a world leader in the frequency of train traffic, as intervals during peak hours often do not exceed 90 seconds. In February 2023, Moscow was the first in the world to reduce the intervals of metro trains to 80 seconds.

== Name ==
The full legal name of the metro has been Moscow Order of Lenin and Order of the Red Banner of Labour V. I. Lenin Metro (Московский ордена Ленина и ордена Трудового Красного Знамени метрополитен имени В. И. Ленина) since 1955. This is usually shortened to V. I. Lenin Metro (Метрополитен им. В. И. Ленина). This shorter official name appears on many stations. Although there were proposals to remove Lenin from the official name, it still stands. During the 1990s and 2000s, Lenin's name was excluded from the signage on newly built and reconstructed stations. In 2016, a Metro representative stated that Lenin's name would remain on station name plates as it aligns with the official name of the company, unchanged since the Soviet era.

The first official name of the metro was L. M. Kaganovich Metro (Метрополитен им. Л.М. Кагановича) after Lazar Kaganovich (see History section). However, when the Metro was awarded the Order of Lenin, it was officially renamed Moscow Order of Lenin L. M. Kaganovich Metro (Московский ордена Ленина Метрополитен им. Л. М. Кагановича) in 1947. When the metro was renamed in 1955, the Okhotny Ryad station was renamed as "Imeni Kaganovicha" in honor of Lazar Kaganovich. In 1957, the original Okhotny Ryad name of the station was reinstated.

== Logo ==
The first line of the Moscow Metro was launched in 1935, complete with the first logo, the capital M paired with the text "МЕТРО". There is no accurate information about the author of the logo, so it is often attributed to the architects of the first stations – Samuil Kravets, Ivan Taranov and Nadezhda Bykova. At the opening in 1935, the M letter on the logo had no definite shape.

In 2014, the Moscow Metro adopted a standardized logo of the network as part of a broader rebranding of the Moscow Transport.

== Operations ==
The Moscow Metro, a state-owned enterprise, is 541.9 km (336.7 mi) long and consists of 17 lines and 309 stations organized in a spoke-hub distribution paradigm, with the majority of rail lines running radially from the centre of Moscow to the outlying areas. The Koltsevaya Line (line 5) forms a 20-kilometre (12 mi) long circle which enables passenger travel between these diameters, and the new Moscow Central Circle (line 14) and even newer Bolshaya Koltsevaya line (line 11) form a 54-kilometre (34 mi) and 57-kilometre (35 mi) long circles respectively that serve a similar purpose on middle periphery. Most stations and lines are underground, but some lines have at-grade and elevated sections; the Filyovskaya Line, Butovskaya Line and the Central Circle Line are the three lines that are at grade or mostly at grade.

The Moscow Metro uses 1,520 mm (4 ft 11 27/32 in) Russian gauge, like other Russian railways, and an underrunning third rail with a supply of 825 volts DC, except line 14, which being directly connected to the mainlines with 3000V DC overhead lines, as is typical. The average distance between stations is 1.7 kilometres (1.1 mi); the shortest (502 metres (1,647 ft) long) section is between Delovoy Tsentr and Moskva-City, and the longest (6.62 kilometres (4.11 mi) long) is between Krylatskoye and Strogino. Long distances between stations have the positive effect of a high cruising speed of 41.7 kilometres per hour (25.9 mph).

The Moscow Metro opens at 05:25 and closes at 01:00. The exact opening time varies at different stations according to the arrival of the first train, but all stations simultaneously close their entrances at 01:00 for maintenance, and so do transfer corridors. The minimum interval between trains is 90 seconds during the morning and evening rush hours.

As of 2017, the system had an average daily ridership of 6.99 million passengers. Peak daily ridership of 9.71 million was recorded on 26 December 2014.

Free Wi-Fi has been available on all lines of the Moscow Metro since 2 December 2014.

== Network ==
=== Lines ===
A Moscow Metro train passes through Sokolnicheskaya and Koltsevaya lines. View from the driver's cabin

Each line is identified by a name, an alphanumeric index (usually consisting of just a number, and sometimes a letter suffix), and a colour. The colour assigned to each line is its colloquial identifier, except for the nondescript greens and blues assigned to the Bolshaya Koltsevaya, the Butovskaya and Troitskaya lines (lines 11, 12, and 16, respectively). The upcoming station is announced by a male voice on inbound trains to the city center (on the Circle line and the Bolshaya Koltsevaya Line, the clockwise trains), and by a female voice on outbound trains (anti-clockwise trains on the Circle line and the Bolshaya Koltsevaya Line).

The metro used to have a connection to the former Moscow Monorail, a 4.7-kilometre (2.9 mi), six-station monorail line between Timiryazevskaya and VDNKh which opened in "excursion mode" (i. e. as a low-frequency service used primarily by tourists) in November 2004 and started providing regular passenger services in January 2008. From 2017 the monorail switched to "excursion mode" with less frequent trains, before being shut down on 27 June 2025.

Note: Line 13 is the former Moscow Monorail that was disestablished in 2025. The lines are still numbered as if the line were there.

Lines of Moscow Metro
Icon	Line Name		First opened	Latest extension	Length (km)	Stations	Avg. dist.
Icon	English	Russian	First opened	Latest extension	Length (km)	Stations	Avg. dist.
#1 Sokolnicheskaya line	Sokolnicheskaya	Сокольническая	1935	2024	43.4	27	1.61
#2 Zamoskvoretskaya line	Zamoskvoretskaya	Замоскворецкая	1938	2018	43.0	24	1.86
#3 Arbatsko-Pokrovskaya line	Arbatsko-Pokrovskaya	Арбатско-Покровская	1938	2012	45.9	22	2.15
#4 Filyovskaya line	Filyovskaya	Филёвская	1958 (1935) (Note: Four central stations of the Filyovskaya Line – Alexandrovsky Sad (formerly Imeni Kominterna), Arbatskaya, Smolenskaya and Kiyevskaya – were originally opened in 1935–1937, when they were a branch of the Sokolnicheskaya Line. Between 1938 and 1953, they were part of the Arbatsko-Pokrovskaya Line. The stations were closed between 1953 and 1958 and then reopened as part of the (new) Filyovskaya Line. A line branching off the Filyovskaya is in operation (as of July 2009), starting from the Alexsandrovsky Sad Station and continuing on the Filyovskaya Line to Kiyevskaya Station, where it departs to stop at the (new) Vystavochnaya and Mezhdunarodnaya Stations.)	2006	14.5	13	1.24
#5 Koltsevaya line	Koltsevaya (Circle)	Кольцевая	1950	1954	19.3	12	1.61
#6 Kaluzhsko-Rizhskaya line	Kaluzhsko-Rizhskaya	Калужско-Рижская	1958	1990	37.6	24	1.63
#7 Tagansko-Krasnopresnenskaya line	Tagansko-Krasnopresnenskaya	Таганско-Краснопресненская	1966	2015	42.3	23	1.92
#8 Kalininskaya line	Kalininskaya (Note: Kalininsko-Solntsevskaya Line currently operates as two separate sections, between Novokosino and Tretyakovskaya and between Aeroport Vnukovo and Delovoy Tsentr.)	Калининская	1979	2012	16.3	8	2.36
#8A Solntsevskaya line	Solntsevskaya	Солнцевская	2014	2023	28.3	14	2.02
#9 Serpukhovsko-Timiryazevskaya line	Serpukhovsko-Timiryazevskaya	Серпуховско-Тимирязевская	1983	2002	41.5	25	1.72
#10 Lyublinsko-Dmitrovskaya line	Lyublinsko-Dmitrovskaya	Люблинско-Дмитровская	1995	2023	44.0	26	1.77
#11 Bolshaya Koltsevaya line	Bolshaya Koltsevaya (Big Circle)	Большая кольцевая	2018	2023	57.6	29	1.98
#12 Butovskaya line	Butovskaya	Бутовская	2003	2014	10.0	7	1.67
#14 Moscow Central Circle	Moscow Central Circle (Note: (MCC) Operated by Moscow Metro, though the service and the rolling stock are outsourced to Russian Railways. Uses the same fares and tickets as the metro system, allowing for free transfers between the Moscow Central Circle and other lines of Moscow Metro proper.)	Московское центральное кольцо	2016	2016	54.0	31	1.74
#15 Nekrasovskaya line	Nekrasovskaya	Некрасовская	2019	2020	13.9	8	1.75
#16 Troitskaya line	Troitskaya	Троицкая	2024	2025	23.9	11	2.17
#17 Rublyovo-Arkhangelskaya line	Rublyovo-Arkhangelskaya	Рублёво-Архангельская	2026	2026	6.7	5	1.33
Total					541.9	309	1.75
Other urban rail lines (Note: Parts of already existing suburban rail lines that have been integrated into the metro system within the boundaries of Moscow Central Diameters (MCD). The MCD lines use the same ticket system as the Moscow Metro proper but, unlike the rest of the network, the MCD has different fare zones and does not have free transfers onto other metro lines.)
#D1 Line D1 (Moscow Central Diameters)	Belorussko-Savyolovsky diameter	Белорусско-Савёловский диаметр	2019	2020	52	26	2.0
#D2 Line D2 (Moscow Central Diameters)	Kursko-Rizhsky diameter	Курско-Рижский диаметр	2019	2023	80	37	2.16
#D3 Line D3 (Moscow Central Diameters)	Leningradsko-Kazansky diameter	Ленинградско-Казанский диаметр	2023	2024	85	39	2.13
#D4 Line D4 (Moscow Central Diameters)	Kaluzhsko-Nizhegorodsky diameter	Калужско-Нижегородский диаметр	2023	2023	86	36	2.39
Total					845	447	1.89

Additionally, from 11 August 1969 to 26 October 2019, the Moscow Metro included Kakhovskaya line 3.3 km (2.1 mi) along with 3 stations, which closed for a long reconstruction. On 7 December 2021, Kakhovskaya was reopened after reconstruction as part of the Bolshaya Koltsevaya line. The renewed Varshavskaya and Kashirskaya stations reopened as part of the Bolshaya Koltsevaya line, which became fully functional on 1 March 2023. Its new stations included Pechatniki, Nagatinsky Zaton and Klenovy Bulvar.

=== Renamed lines ===
- Sokolnicheskaya line was previously named Kirovsko-Frunzenskaya
- Zamoskvoretskaya line was previously named Gorkovsko-Zamoskvoretskaya.
- Filyovskaya line was previously named Arbatsko-Filyovskaya.
- Tagansko-Krasnopresnenskaya line was previously named Zhdanovsko-Krasnopresnenskaya

== History ==
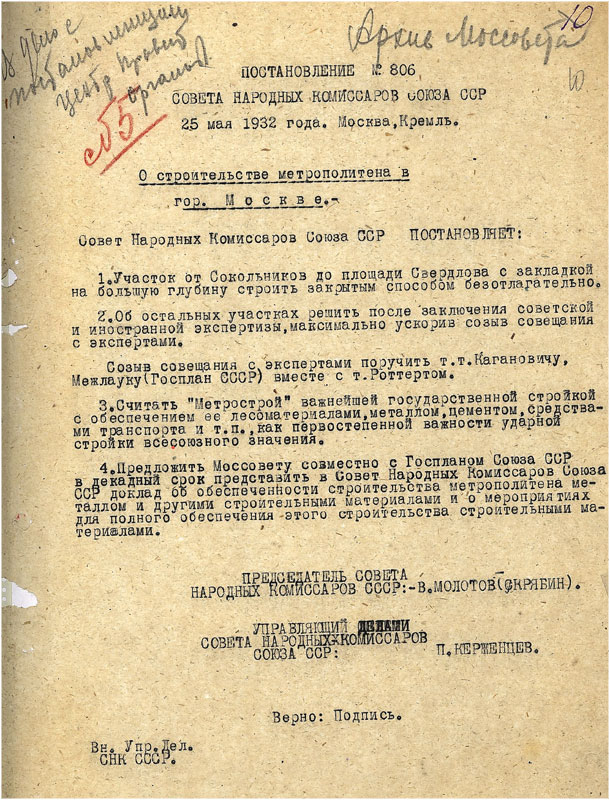
Soviet government resolution to construct the Moscow Metro

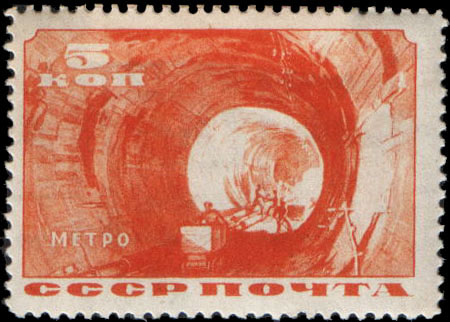
1935 Soviet stamp marking the opening of the first Moscow metro line

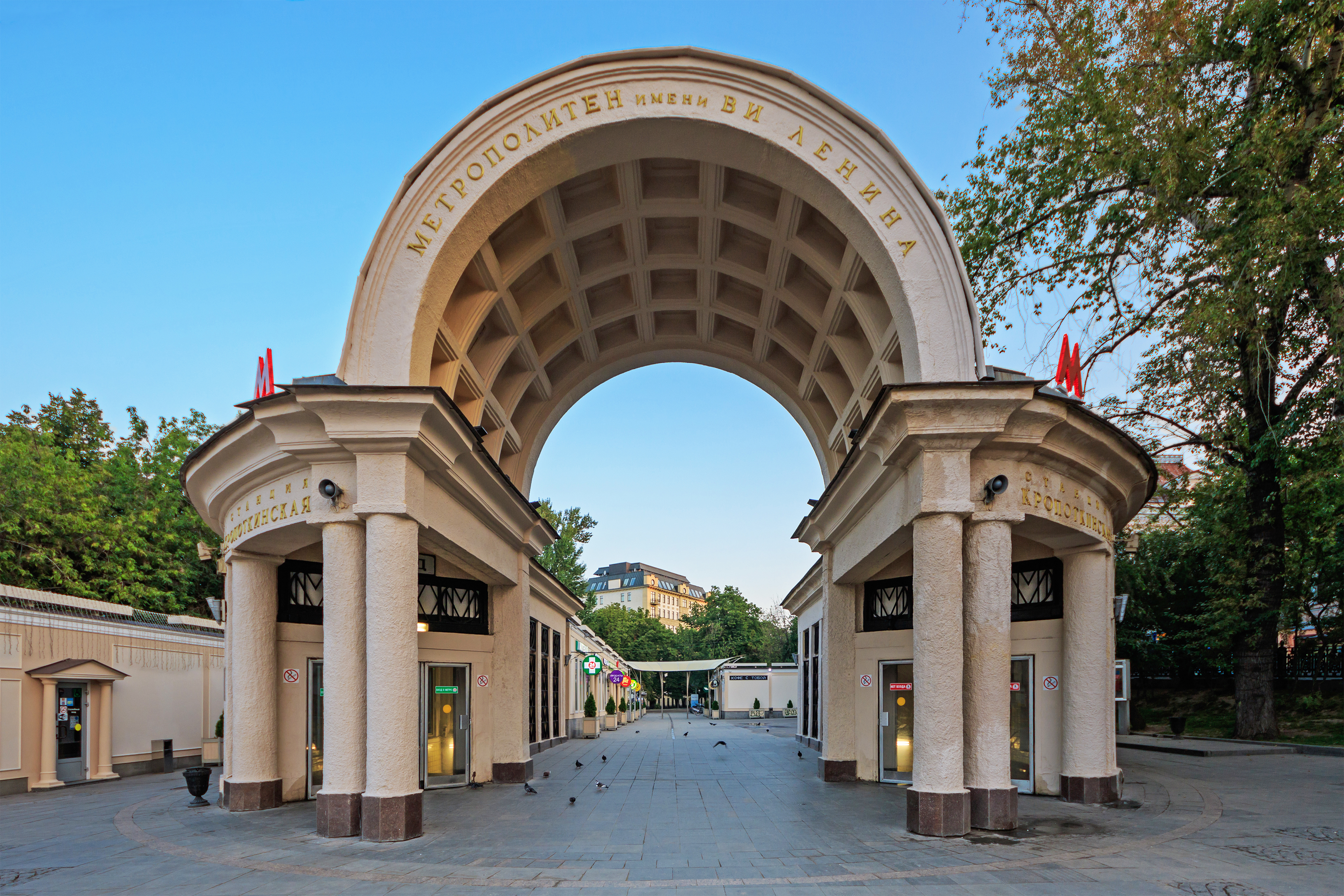
Vestibule of the Kropotkinskaya station in 2016, with the official name of the metro "V.I. Lenin Metro" (Метрополитен имени В.И. Ленина)

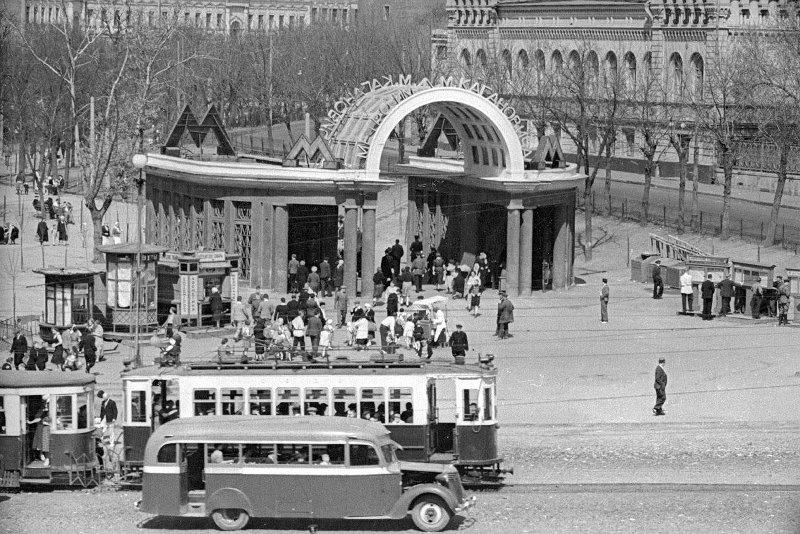
The same vestibule in 1935, with the previous name of the metro: "L.M. Kaganovich Metro" (Метро им. Л.М. Кагановича)

The first plans for a metro system in Moscow date back to the Russian Empire but were postponed by World War I, the October Revolution and the Russian Civil War. In 1923, the Moscow City Council formed the Underground Railway Design Office at the Moscow Board of Urban Railways. It carried out preliminary studies, and by 1928 had developed a project for the first route from Sokolniki to the city centre. At the same time, an offer was made to the German company Siemens Bauunion to submit its own project for the same route. In June 1931, the decision to begin construction of the Moscow Metro was made by the Central Committee of the Communist Party of the Soviet Union. In January 1932 the plan for the first lines was approved, and on 21 March 1933 the Soviet government approved a plan for 10 lines with a total route length of 80 km (50 mi).

The first lines were built using the Moscow general plan designed by Lazar Kaganovich, along with his project managers (notably Ivan M. Kuznetsov and, later, Isaac Y. Segal) in the 1930s–1950s, and the Metro was named after him until 1955 (Metropoliten im. L.M. Kaganovicha). The Moscow Metro construction engineers consulted with their counterparts from the London Underground, the world's oldest metro system, in 1936: British architect Charles Holden and administrator Frank Pick had been working on the station developments of the Piccadilly Line extension, and Soviet delegates to London were impressed by Holden's thoroughly modern redeployment of classical elements and use of high-quality materials for the circular ticket hall of Piccadilly Circus, and so engaged Pick and Holden as advisors to Moscow's metro system. Partly because of this connection, the design of Gants Hill tube station, which was completed in 1947, is reminiscent of a Moscow Metro station. Indeed, Holden's homage to Moscow has been described as a gesture of gratitude for the USSR's helpful role in The Second World War.

Soviet workers did the labour and the art work, but the main engineering designs, routes, and construction plans were handled by specialists recruited from London Underground. The British called for tunnelling instead of the "cut-and-cover" technique, the use of escalators instead of lifts, the routes and the design of the rolling stock. The paranoia of the NKVD was evident when this secret police organisation arrested numerous British engineers for espionage because they gained an in-depth knowledge of the city's physical layout. Engineers for the Metropolitan-Vickers Electrical Company (Metrovick) were given a show trial and deported in 1933, ending the role of British business in the USSR.

=== First four stages of construction ===
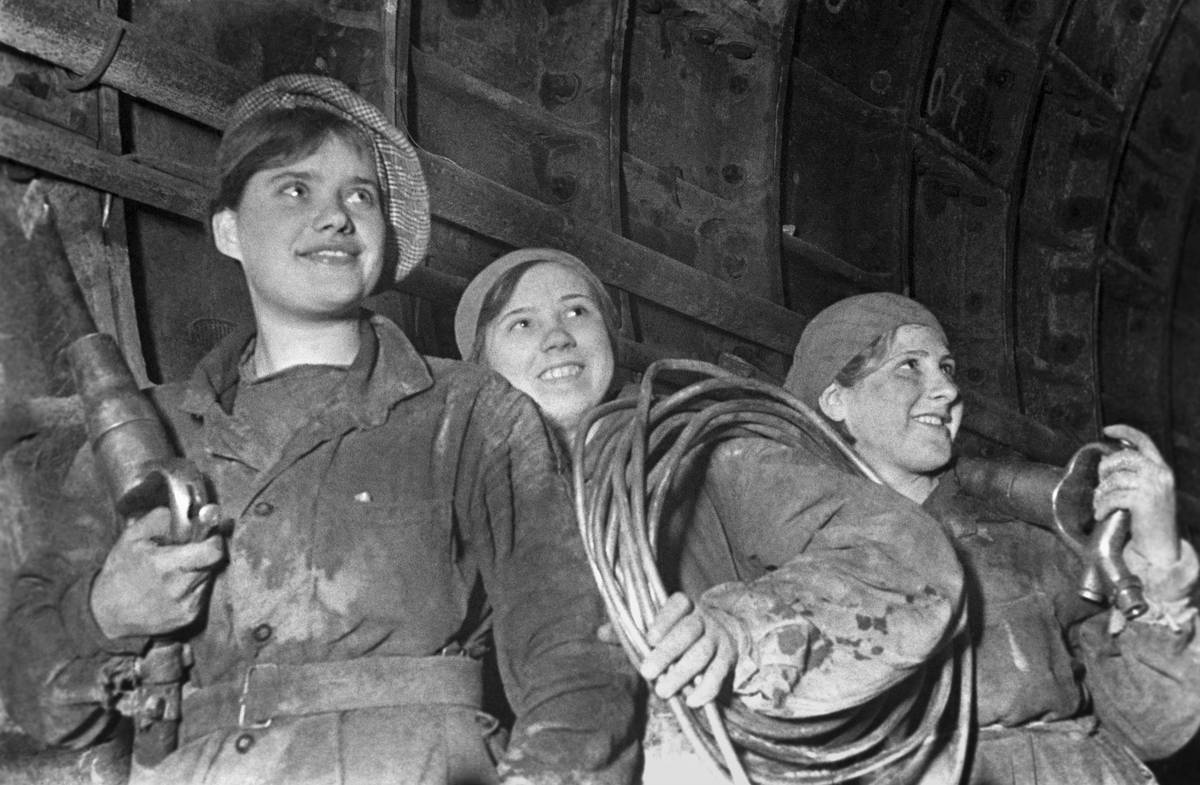
Women's construction brigade led by Tatyana Viktorovna Fyodorova during construction of the second line of the Moscow metro, 1936

The first line was opened to the public on 15 May 1935 at 07:00 am. It was 11 kilometres (6.8 mi) long and included 13 stations. The day was celebrated as a technological and ideological victory for socialism (and, by extension, Stalinism). The designers consulted with employees of the London Underground during the initial planning phase, and much of the engineering design work was done by British engineers.

An estimated 285,000 people rode the Metro at its debut, and its design was greeted with pride; street celebrations included parades, plays and concerts. The Bolshoi Theatre presented a choral performance by 2,200 Metro workers; 55,000 coloured posters (lauding the Metro as the busiest and fastest in the world) and 25,000 copies of "Songs of the Joyous Metro Conquerors" were distributed. The Moscow Metro averaged 47 km/h (29 mph) and had a top speed of 80 km/h (50 mph). In comparison, New York City Subway trains averaged a slower 25 miles per hour (40 km/h) and had a top speed of 45 miles per hour (72 km/h).

The initial line connected Sokolniki to Okhotny Ryad then branching to Park Kultury and Smolenskaya. The latter branch was extended westwards to a new station (Kiyevskaya) in March 1937, the first Metro line crossing the Moskva River over the Smolensky Metro Bridge.

The second stage was completed before the war. In March 1938, the Arbatskaya branch was split and extended to the Kurskaya station (now the dark-blue Arbatsko-Pokrovskaya Line). In September 1938, the Gorkovskaya Line opened between Sokol and Teatralnaya. Here the architecture was based on that of the most popular stations in existence (Krasniye Vorota, Okhotnyi Ryad and Kropotkinskaya); while following the popular art-deco style, it was merged with socialist themes. The first deep-level column station Mayakovskaya was built at the same time.

Building work on the third stage was delayed (but not interrupted) during World War II, and two Metro sections were put into service; Teatralnaya–Avtozavodskaya (three stations, crossing the Moskva River through a deep tunnel) and Kurskaya–Partizanskaya (four stations) were inaugurated in 1943 and 1944 respectively. War motifs replaced socialist visions in the architectural design of these stations. During the Siege of Moscow in the fall and winter of 1941, Metro stations were used as air-raid shelters; the Council of Ministers moved its offices to the Mayakovskaya platforms, where Stalin made public speeches on several occasions. The Chistiye Prudy station was also walled off, and the headquarters of the Air Defence established there.

After the war ended in 1945, construction began on the fourth stage of the Metro, which included the Koltsevaya Line, a deep part of the Arbatsko-Pokrovskaya line from Ploshchad Revolyutsii to Kievskaya and a surface extension to Pervomaiskaya during the early 1950s. The decoration and design characteristic of the Moscow Metro is considered to have reached its zenith in these stations. The Koltsevaya Line was first planned as a line running under the Garden Ring, a wide avenue encircling the borders of Moscow's city centre. The first part of the line – from Park Kultury to Kurskaya (1950) – follows this avenue. Plans were later changed and the northern part of the ring line runs 1–1.5 kilometres (0.62–0.93 mi) outside the Sadovoye Koltso, thus providing service for seven (out of nine) rail terminals. The next part of the Koltsevaya Line opened in 1952 (Kurskaya–Belorusskaya), and in 1954 the ring line was completed.

==== Stalinist ideals in Metro's history ====
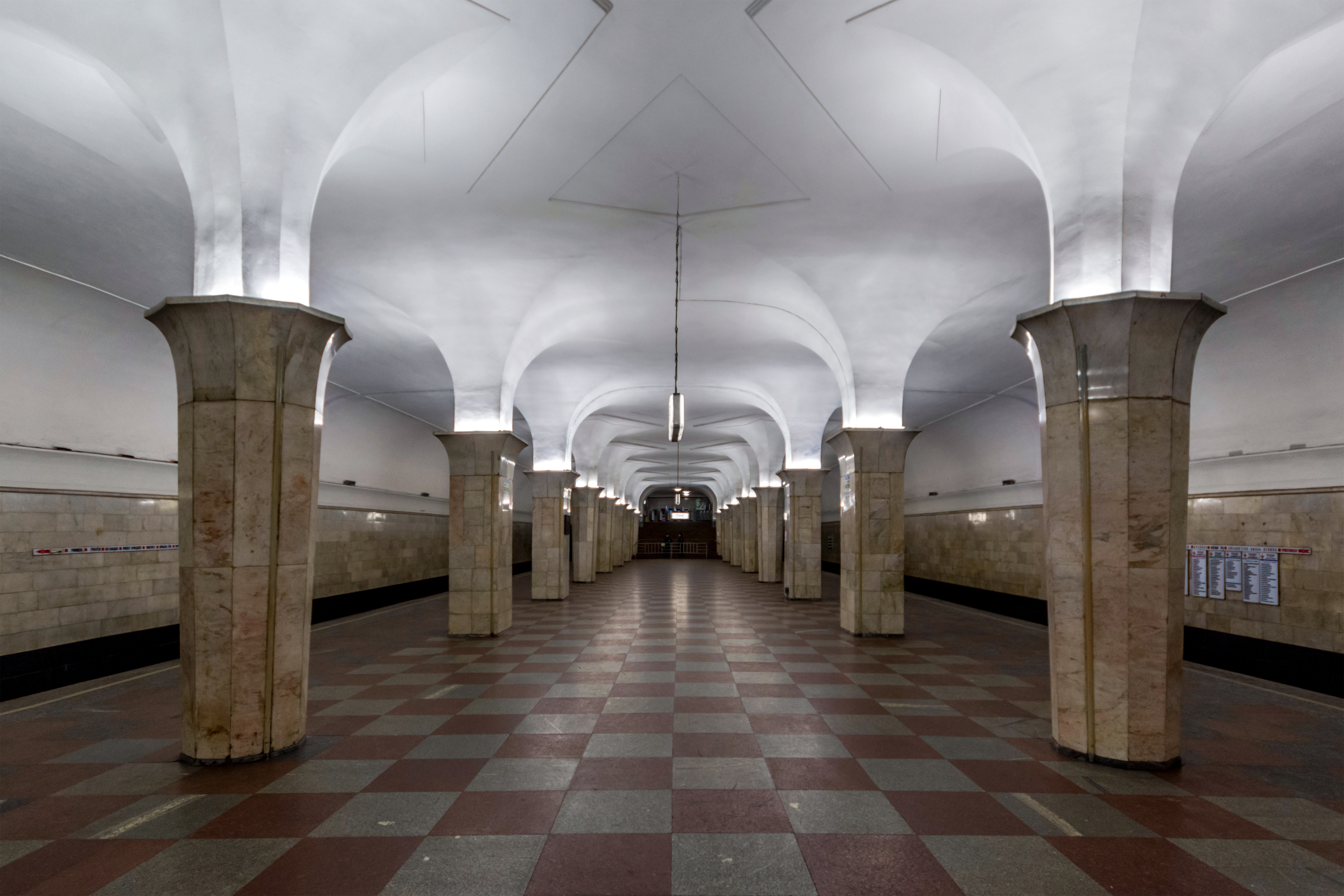
Kropotkinskaya station, Line 1. Opened in 1935 (the first stage)

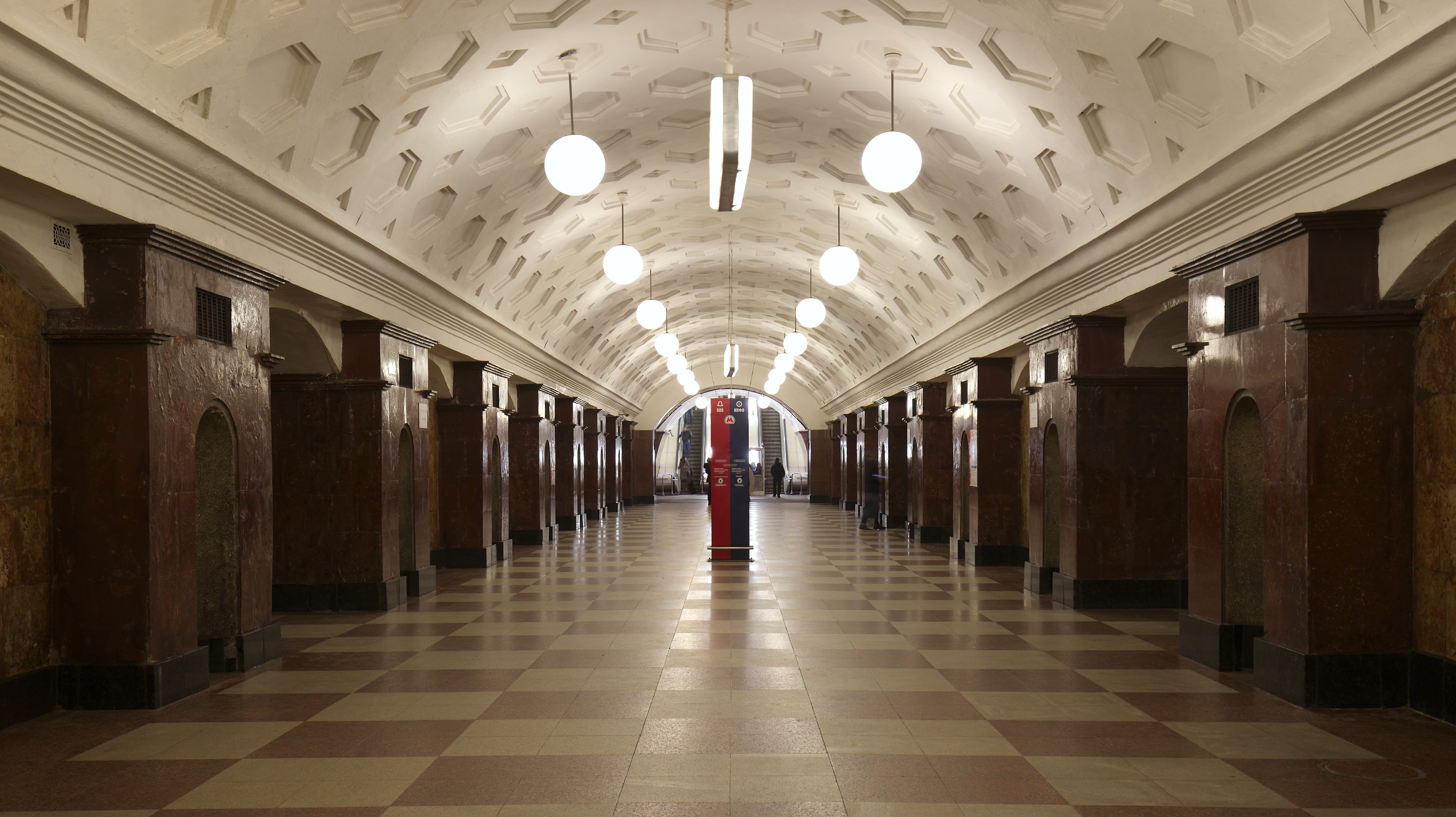
Krasnye Vorota, also opened in 1935 (the first stage) as part of Line 1

External videos
- Moscow Metro opening, Soviet Archive Footage

When the Metro opened in 1935, it immediately became the centrepiece of the transportation system (as opposed to horse-carried barrows still widely used in 1930s Moscow). It also became the prototype, the vision for future Soviet large-scale technologies. The artwork of the 13 original stations became nationally and internationally famous. For example, the Sverdlov Square subway station featured porcelain bas-reliefs depicting the daily life of the Soviet peoples, and the bas-reliefs at the Dynamo Stadium sports complex glorified sports and physical prowess on the powerful new "Homo Sovieticus" (Soviet man). The metro was touted as the symbol of the new social order—a sort of Communist cathedral of engineering modernity.

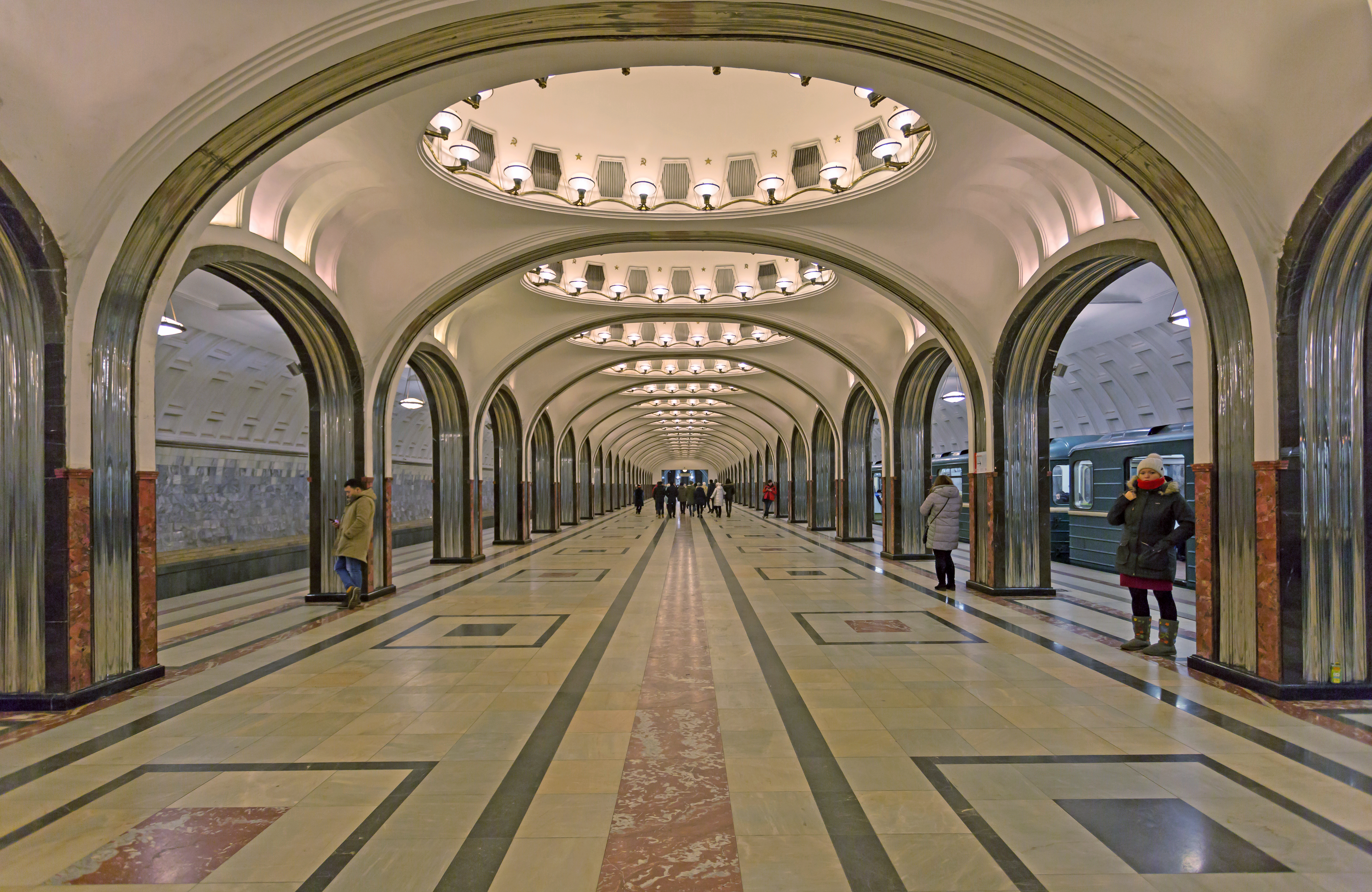
Mayakovskaya station, Line 2. Opened in 1938 (the second stage)

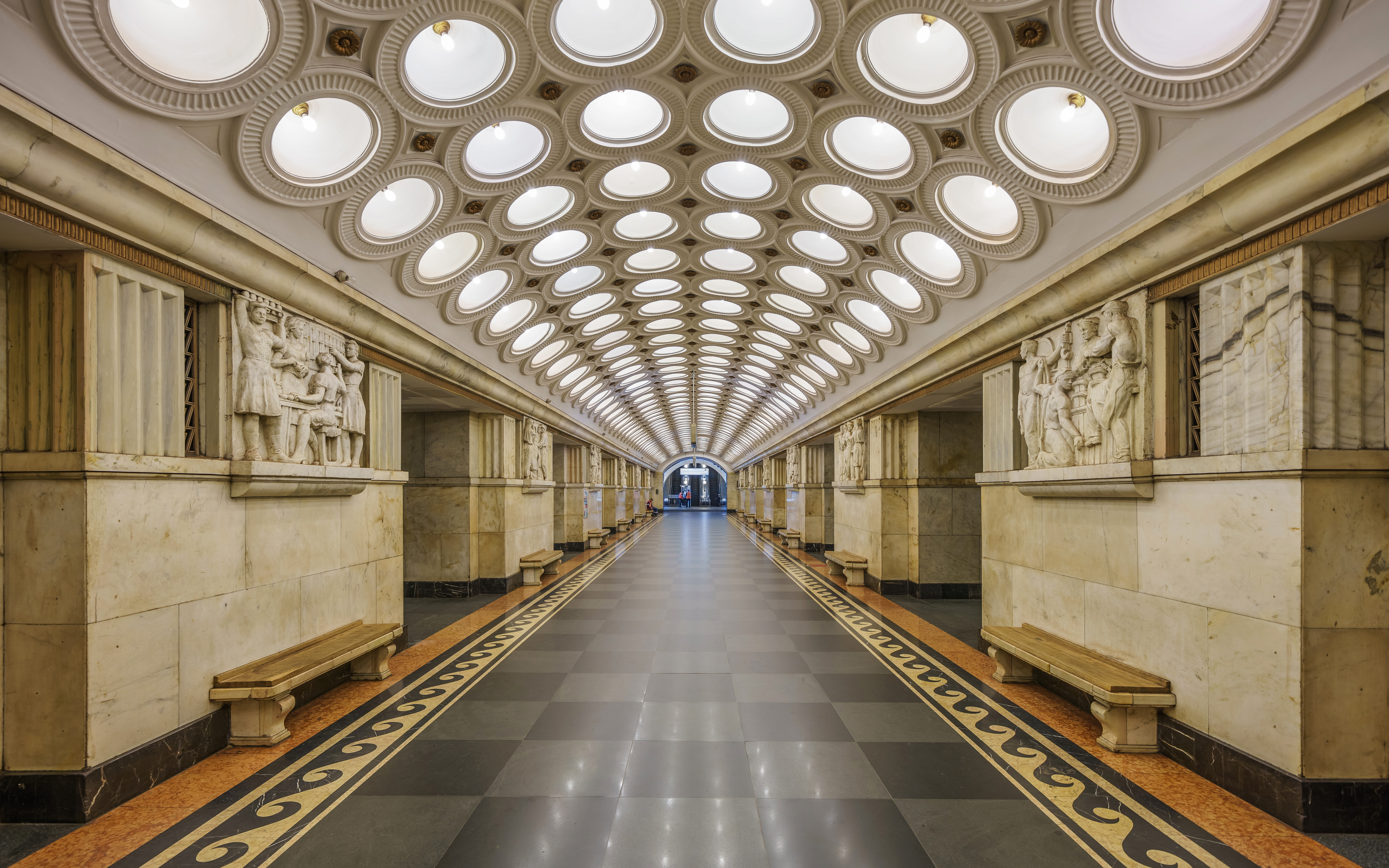
Elektrozavodskaya station, Line 3. Opened in 1944 (the third stage)

The Metro was also iconic for showcasing Socialist Realism in public art. The method was influenced by Nikolay Chernyshevsky, Lenin's favorite 19th-century nihilist, who stated that "art is no useful unless it serves politics". This maxim sums up the reasons why the stations combined aesthetics, technology and ideology: any plan which did not incorporate all three areas cohesively was rejected.

- Kaganovich was in charge; he designed the subway so that citizens would absorb the values and ethos of Stalinist civilization as they rode. Without this cohesion, the Metro would not reflect Socialist Realism. If the Metro did not utilize Socialist Realism, it would fail to illustrate Stalinist values and transform Soviet citizens into socialists. Anything less than Socialist Realism's grand artistic complexity would fail to inspire a long-lasting, nationalistic attachment to Stalin's new society.
- Socialist Realism was in fact a method, not exactly a style.

==== Bright future and literal brightness in the Metro of Moscow ====
The Moscow Metro was one of the USSR's most ambitious architectural projects. The metro's artists and architects worked to design a structure that embodied svet (literally "light", figuratively "radiance" or "brilliance") and svetloe budushchee (a well-lit/radiant/bright future). With their reflective marble walls, high ceilings and grand chandeliers, many Moscow Metro stations have been likened to an "artificial underground sun".

This palatial underground environment reminded Metro users their taxes were spent on materializing bright future; also, the design was useful for demonstrating the extra structural strength of the underground works (as in Metro doubling as bunkers, bomb shelters).

The chief lighting engineer was Abram Damsky, a graduate of the Higher State Art-Technical Institute in Moscow. By 1930 he was a chief designer in Moscow's Elektrosvet Factory, and during World War II was sent to the Metrostroi (Metro Construction) Factory as head of the lighting shop. Damsky recognized the importance of efficiency, as well as the potential for light as an expressive form. His team experimented with different materials (most often cast bronze, aluminum, sheet brass, steel, and milk glass) and methods to optimize the technology. Damsky's discourse on "Lamps and Architecture 1930–1950" describes in detail the epic chandeliers installed in the Taganskaya Station and the Kaluzhskaia station (Oktyabrskaya nowadays, not to be confused with contemporary "Kaluzhskaya" station on line 6). The work of Abram Damsky further publicized these ideas hoping people would associate the party with the idea of bright future.

The Oktyabrskaya Station (originally named Kaluzhskaya) was designed by the architect [Leonid] Poliakov. Poliakov's decision to base his design on a reinterpretation of Russian classical architecture clearly influenced the concept of the lamps, some of which I planned in collaboration with the architect himself. The shape of the lamps was a torch – the torch of victory, as Polyakov put it... The artistic quality and stylistic unity of all the lamps throughout the station's interior made them perhaps the most successful element of the architectural composition. All were made of cast aluminum decorated in a black and gold anodized coating, a technique which the Metrostroi factory had only just mastered.

The Taganskaia Metro Station on the Ring Line was designed in...quite another style by the architects K.S. Ryzhkov and A. Medvedev... Their subject matter dealt with images of war and victory...The overall effect was one of ceremony ... In the platform halls the blue ceramic bodies of the chandeliers played a more modest role, but still emphasised the overall expressiveness of the lamp.

— Abram Damsky, Lamps and Architecture 1930–1950

==== Industrialization ====
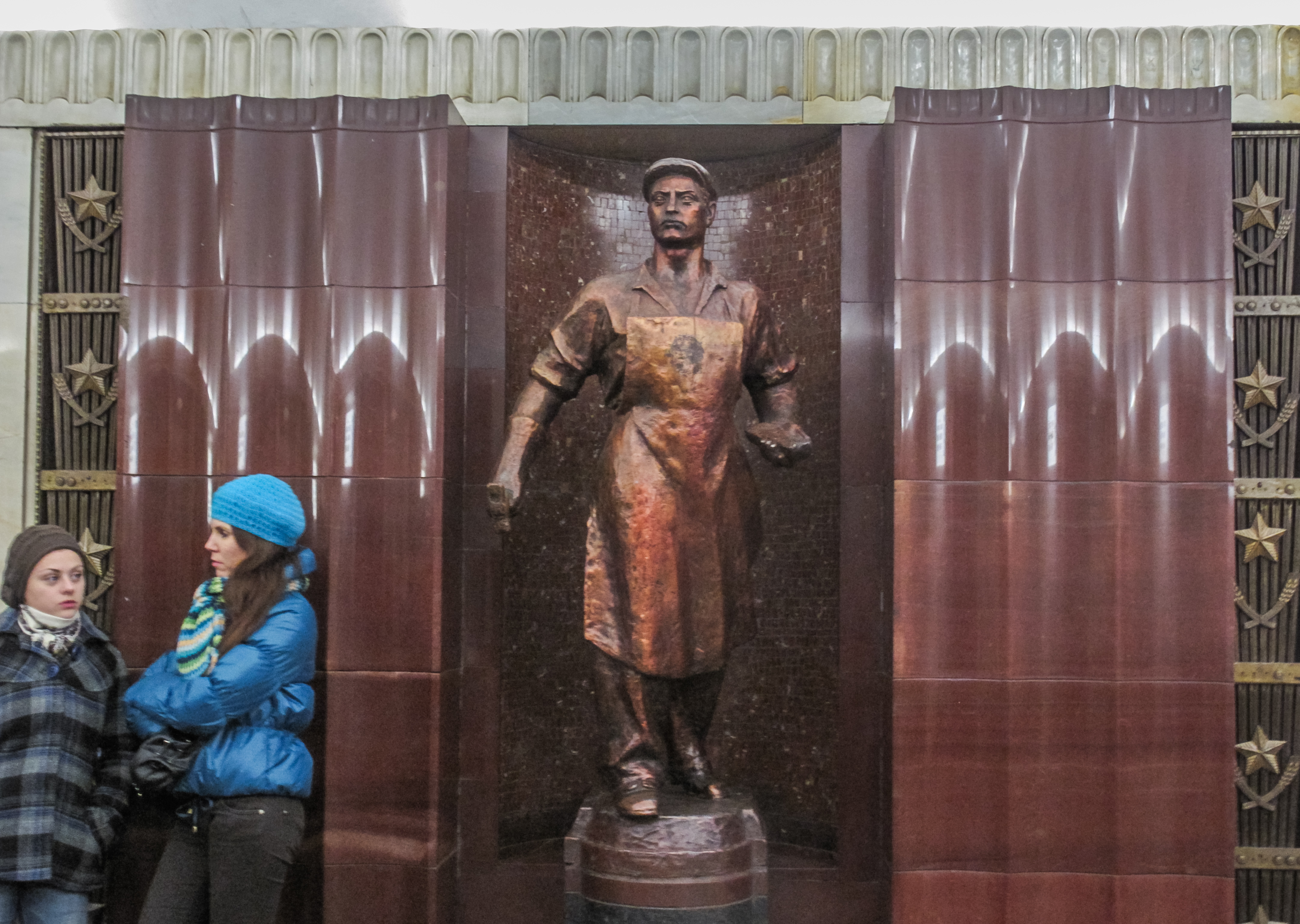
Statue representing the Soviet workers at Baumanskaya station (1944)

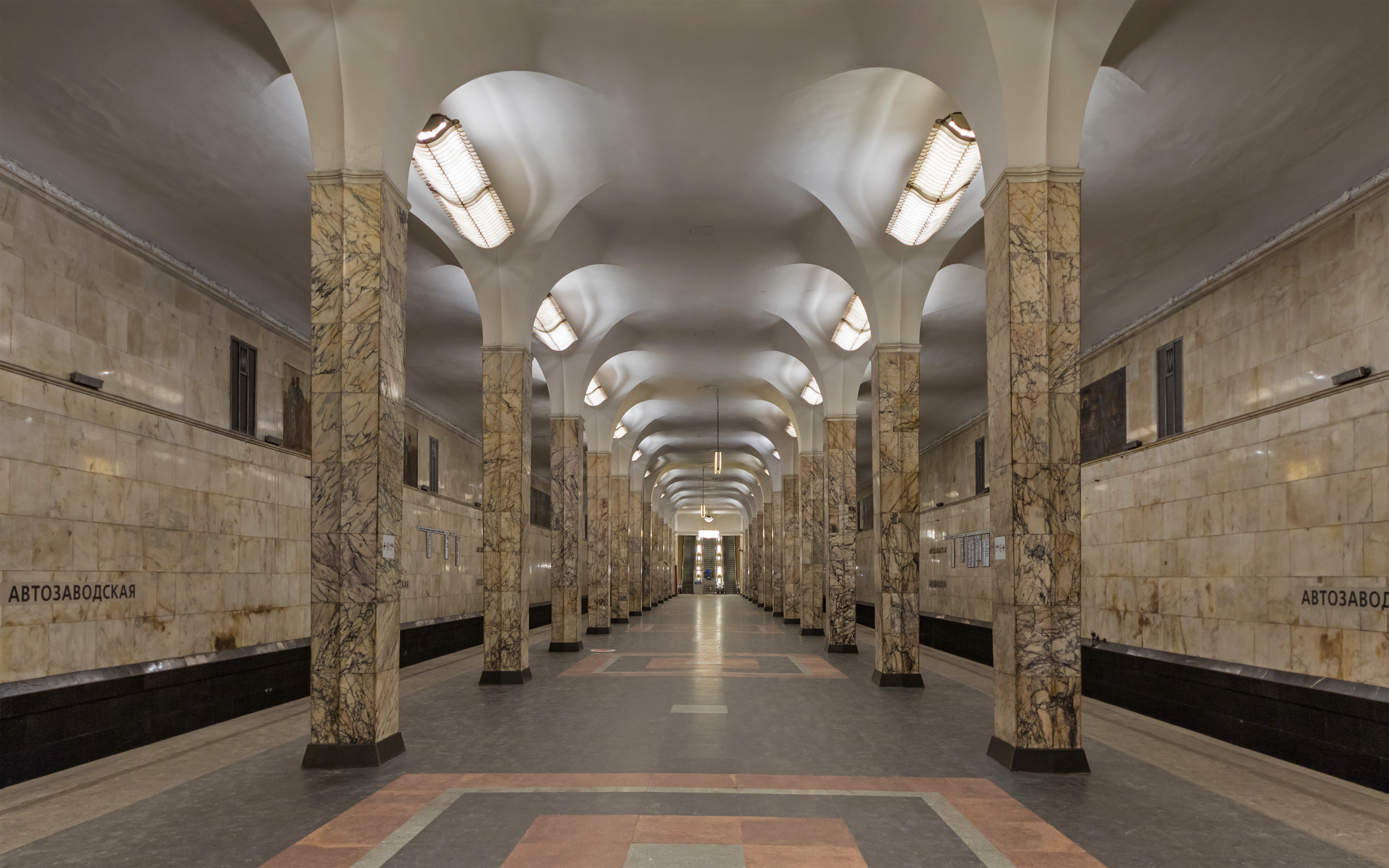
Avtozavodskaya station (1943) features frescos that commemorate the USSR's automotive and arms industry

Stalin's first five-year plan (1928–1932) facilitated rapid industrialization to build a socialist motherland. The plan was ambitious, seeking to reorient an agrarian society towards industrialism. It was Stalin's fanatical energy, large-scale planning, and resource distribution that kept up the pace of industrialization. The first five-year plan was instrumental in the completion of the Moscow Metro; without industrialization, the Soviet Union would not have had the raw materials necessary for the project. For example, steel was a main component of many subway stations. Before industrialization, it would have been impossible for the Soviet Union to produce enough steel to incorporate it into the metro's design; in addition, a steel shortage would have limited the size of the subway system and its technological advancement.

The Moscow Metro furthered the construction of a socialist Soviet Union because the project accorded with Stalin's second five-year plan. The Second Plan focused on urbanization and the development of social services. The Moscow Metro was necessary to cope with the influx of peasants who migrated to the city during the 1930s; Moscow's population had grown from 2.16 million in 1928 to 3.6 million in 1933. The Metro also bolstered Moscow's shaky infrastructure and its communal services, which hitherto were nearly nonexistent.

==== Mobilization ====
The Communist Party had the power to mobilize; because the party was a single source of control, it could focus its resources. The most notable example of mobilization in the Soviet Union occurred during World War II. The country also mobilized in order to complete the Moscow Metro with unprecedented speed. One of the main motivation factors of the mobilization was to overtake the West and prove that a socialist metro could surpass capitalist designs. It was especially important to the Soviet Union that socialism succeed industrially, technologically, and artistically in the 1930s, since capitalism was at a low ebb during the Great Depression.

The person in charge of Metro mobilization was Lazar Kaganovich. A prominent Party member, he assumed control of the project as chief overseer. Kaganovich was nicknamed the "Iron Commissar"; he shared Stalin's fanatical energy, dramatic oratory flare, and ability to keep workers building quickly with threats and punishment. He was determined to realise the Moscow Metro, regardless of cost. Without Kaganovich's managerial ability, the Moscow Metro might have met the same fate as the Palace of the Soviets: failure.

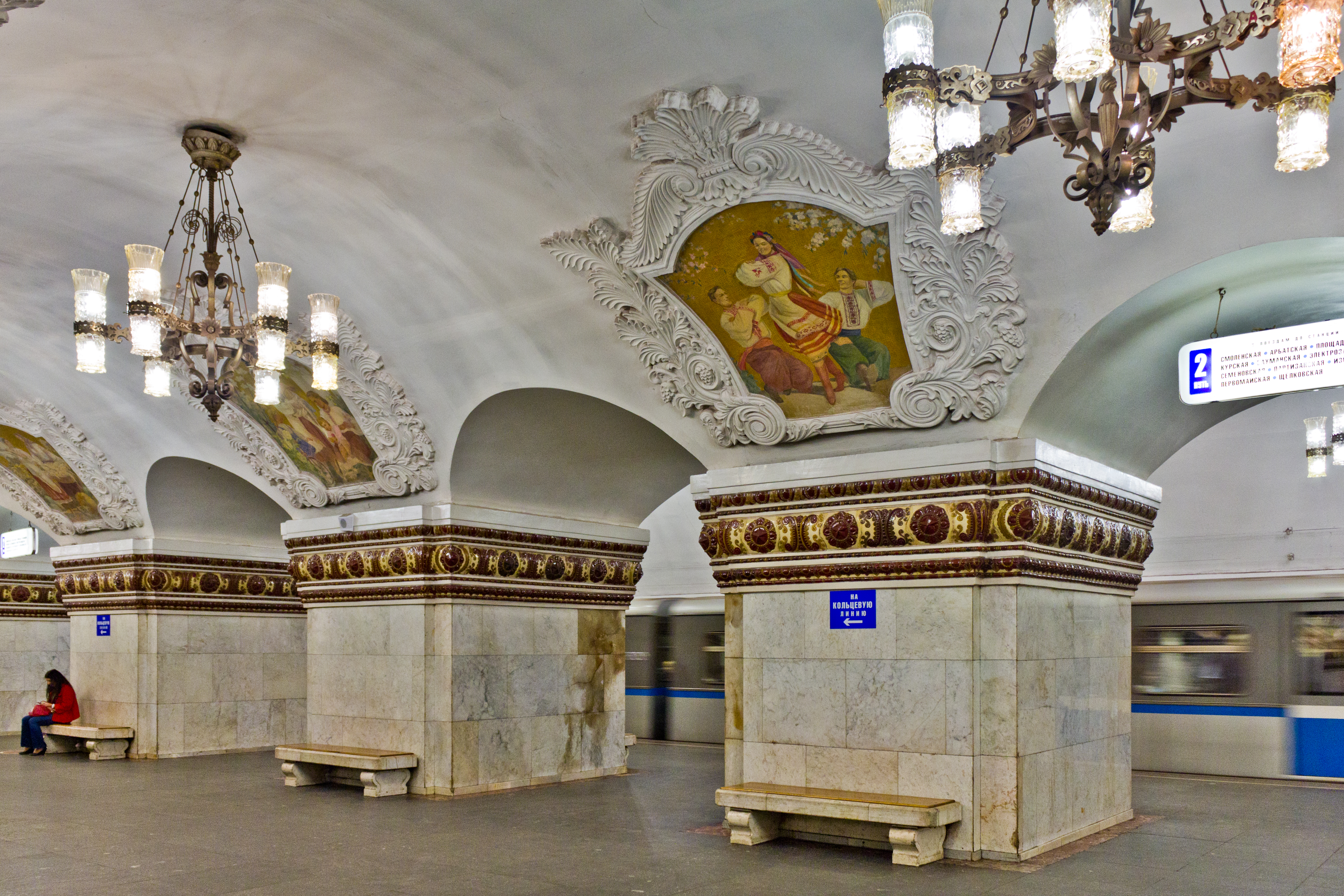
Kiyevskaya (Line 3) (1954) is decorated with a series of mosaics by various artists depicting life in Ukraine which was then part of the Soviet Union.

This was a comprehensive mobilization; the project drew resources and workers from the entire Soviet Union. In his article, archeologist Mike O'Mahoney describes the scope of the Metro mobilization:

A specialist workforce had been drawn from many different regions, including miners from the Ukrainian and Siberian coalfields and construction workers from the iron and steel mills of Magnitogorsk, the Dniepr hydroelectric power station, and the Turkestan-Siberian railway... materials used in the construction of the metro included iron from Siberian Kuznetsk, timber from northern Russia, cement from the Volga region and the northern Caucasus, bitumen from Baku, and marble and granite from quarries in Karelia, the Crimea, the Caucasus, the Urals, and the Soviet Far East

— Mike O'Mahoney, Archeological Fantasies: Constructing History on the Moscow Metro

Skilled engineers were scarce, and unskilled workers were instrumental to the realization of the metro. The Metrostroi (the organization responsible for the Metro's construction) conducted massive recruitment campaigns. It printed 15,000 copies of Udarnik metrostroia (Metrostroi Shock Worker, its daily newspaper) and 700 other newsletters (some in different languages) to attract unskilled laborers. Kaganovich was closely involved in the recruitment campaign, targeting the Komsomol generation because of its strength and youth.

=== Later Soviet stations ===
==== "Fifth stage" set of stations ====
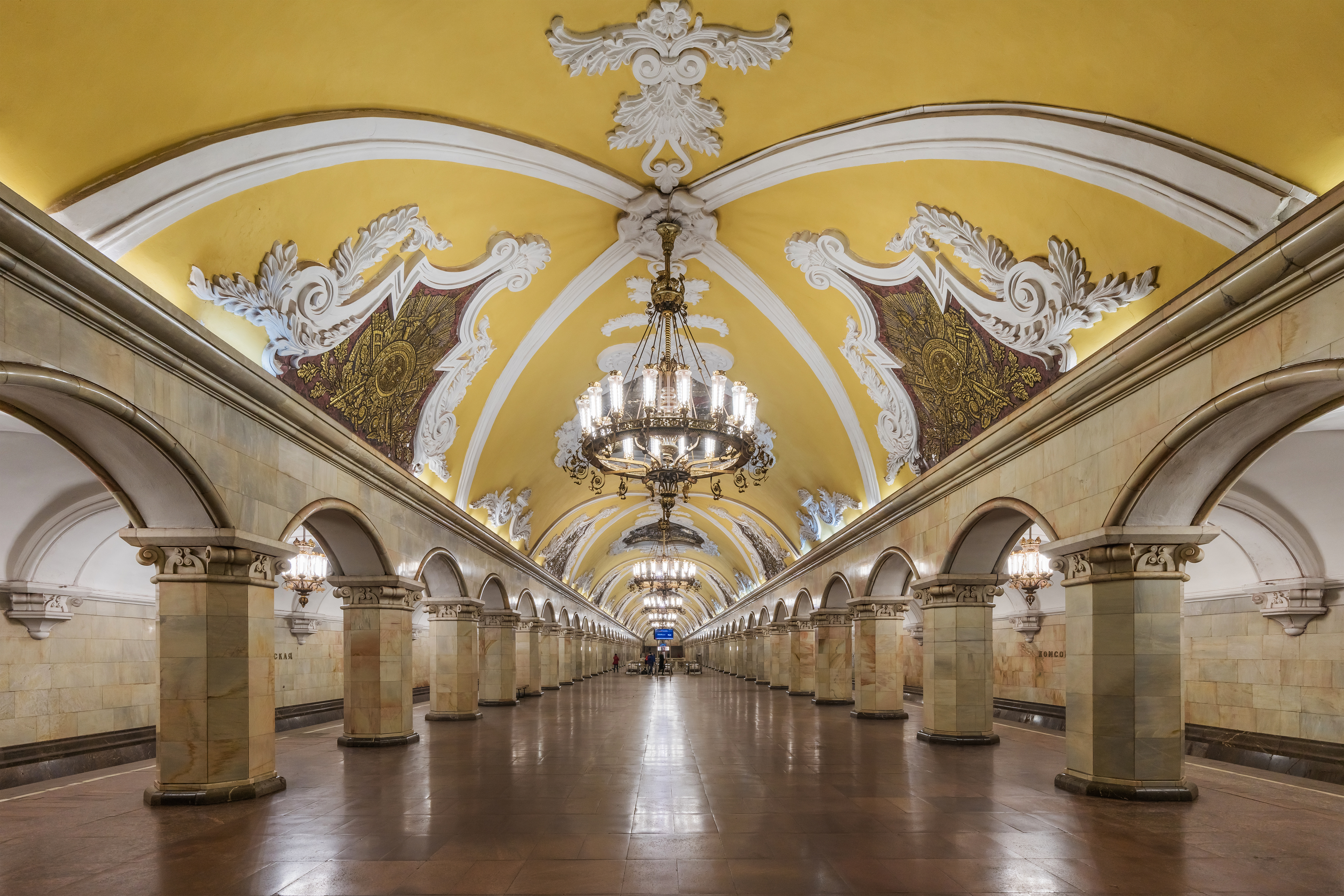
Komsomolskaya station (1952), Line 5

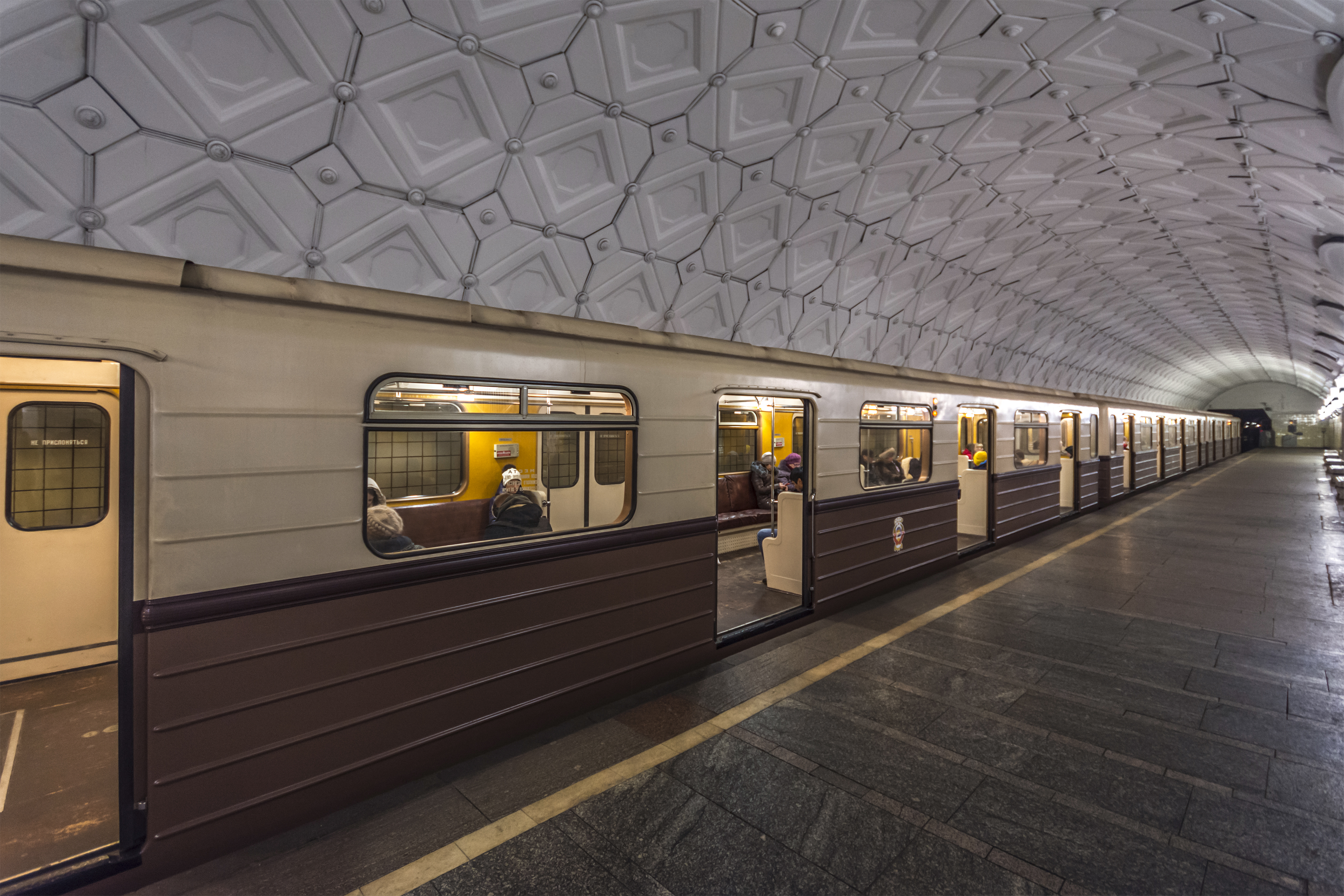
Sportivnaya station (1957), Line 1 (with a "retro train")

The beginning of the Cold War led to the construction of a deep section of the Arbatsko-Pokrovskaya Line. The stations on this line were planned as shelters in the event of nuclear war. After finishing the line in 1953 the upper tracks between Ploshchad Revolyutsii and Kiyevskaya were closed, and later reopened in 1958 as a part of the Filyovskaya Line. The stations, too, were supplied with tight gates and life-sustenance systems to function as proper nuclear shelters.

In the further development of the Metro the term "stages" was not used any more, although sometimes the stations opened in 1957–1959 are referred to as the "fifth stage".

==== Nikita Khrushchev's era of cost-cutting ====
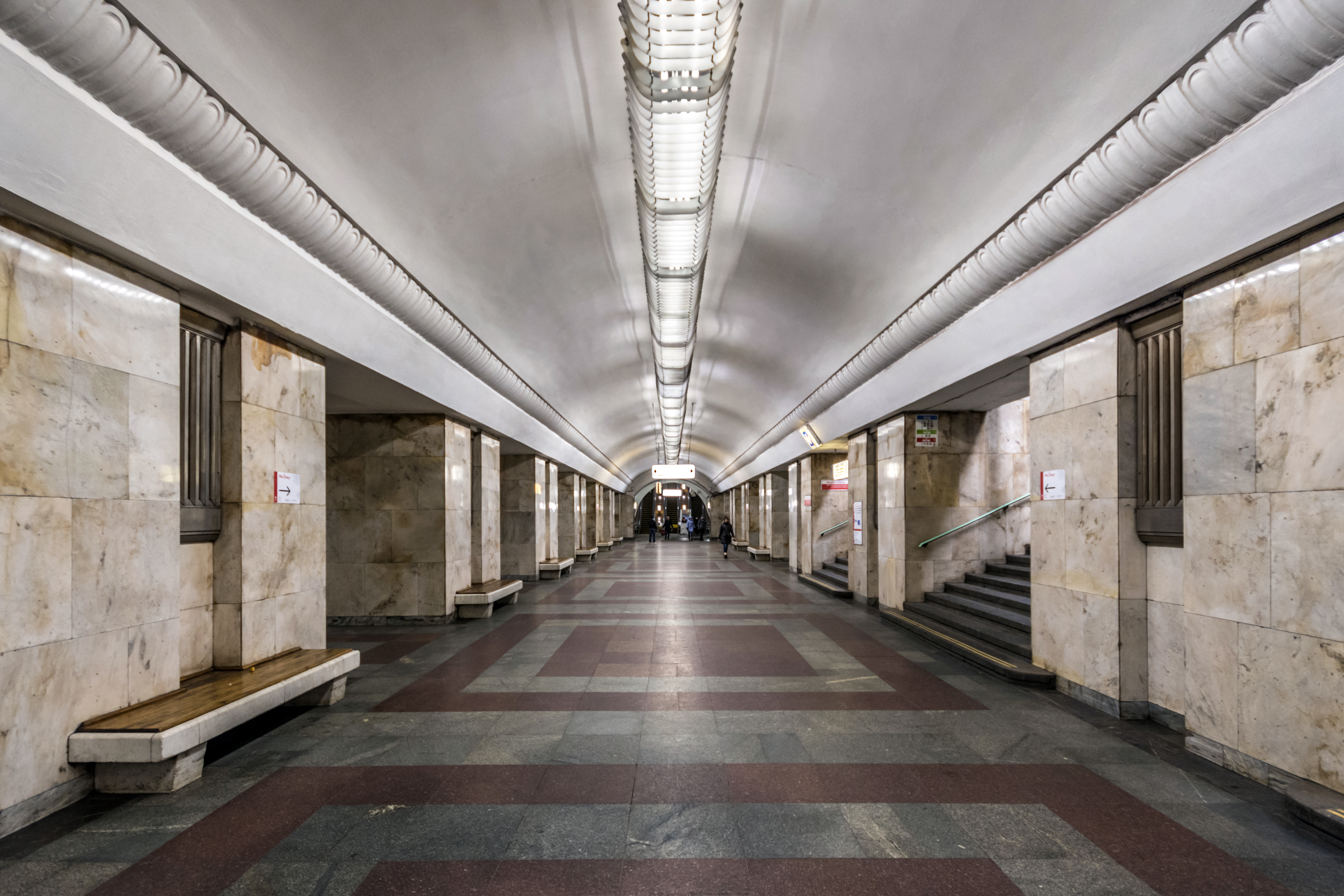
Universitet (1959), Line 1

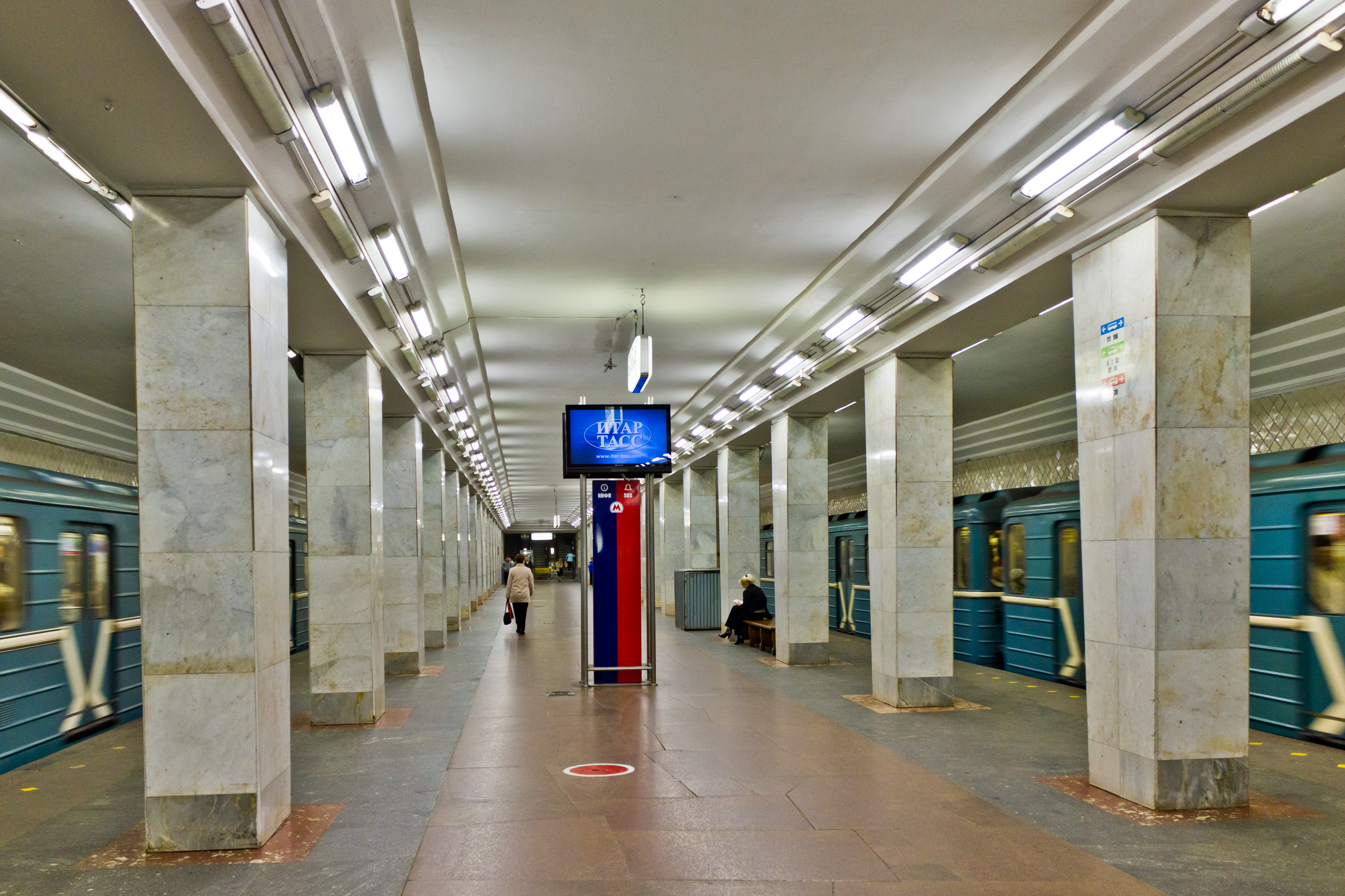
Leninsky Prospekt (1962), Line 6

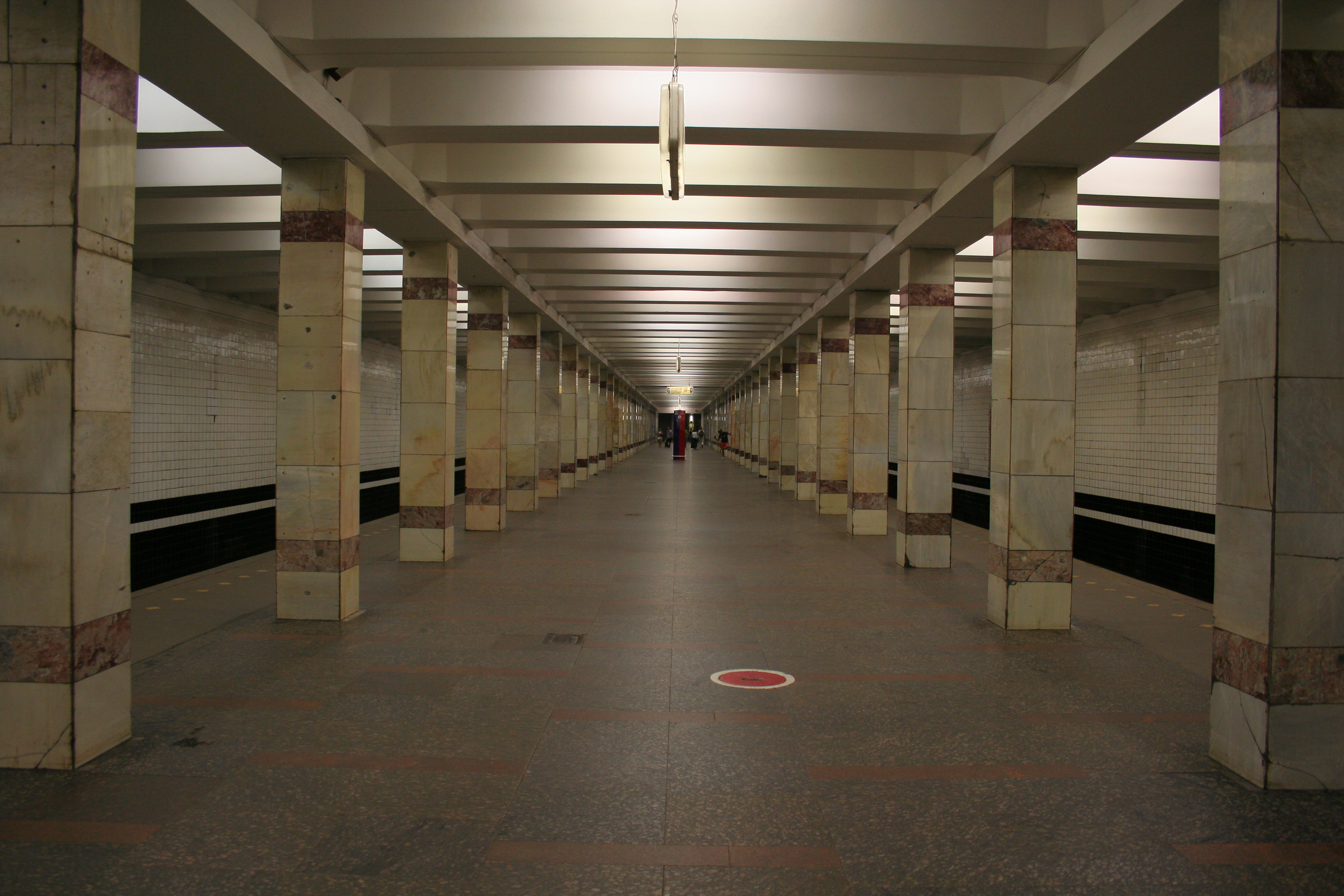
Molodyozhnaya (1965), Line 3

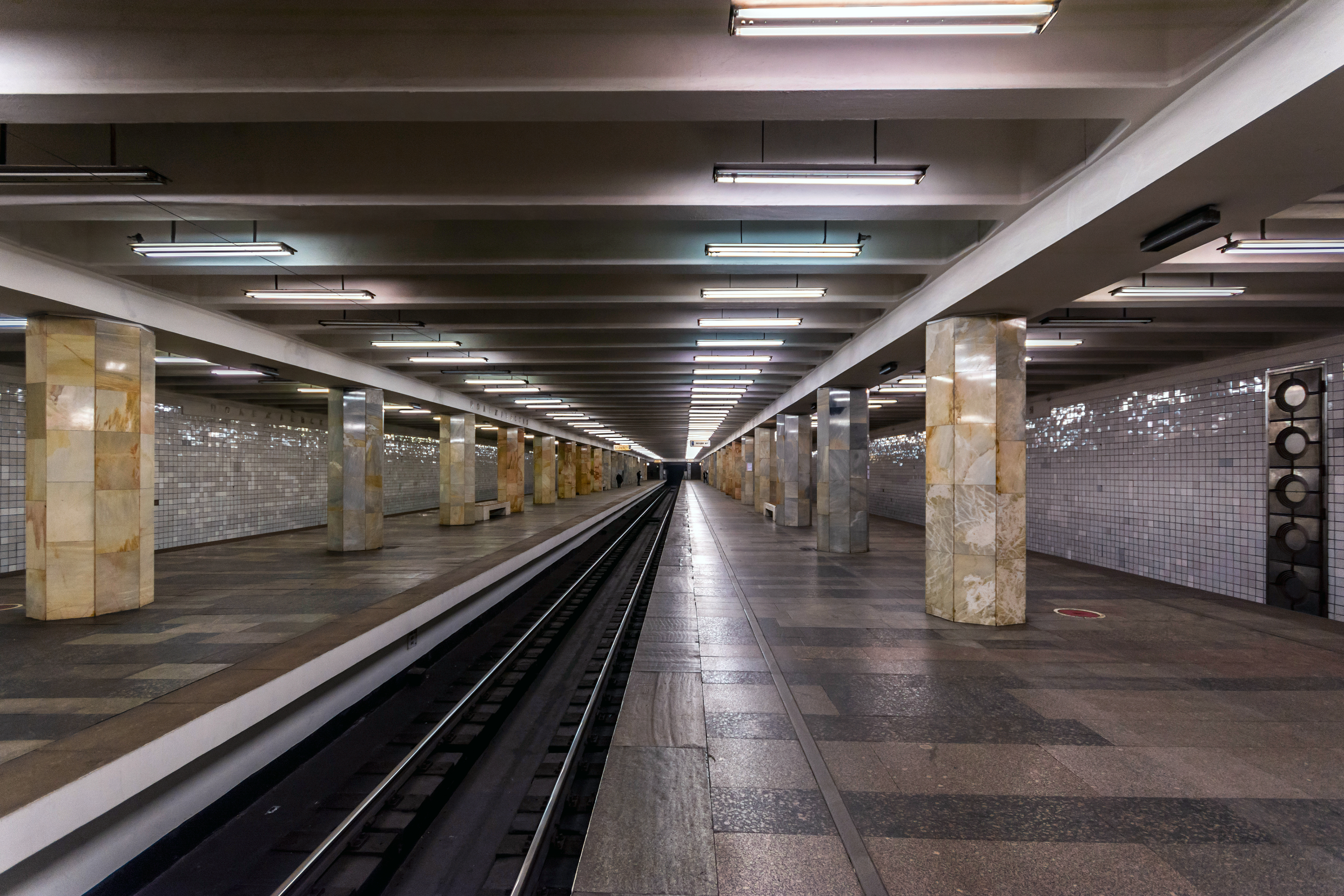
Polezhayevskaya (1972), Line 7. As of January 2022, the variegated walls are preserved "as is"

During the late 1950s and throughout the 1960s, the architectural extravagance of new Metro stations was decisively rejected on the orders of Nikita Khrushchev. He had a preference for a utilitarian "minimalism"-like approach to design, similar to Brutalism style. The idea behind the rejection was similar to one used to create Khrushchyovkas: cheap yet easily mass-produced buildings. Stations of his era, as well as most 1970s stations, were simple in design and style, with walls covered with identical square ceramic tiles. Even decorations at the Metro stations almost finished at the time of the ban (such as VDNKh and Alexeyevskaya) got their final decors simplified: VDNKh's arcs/portals, for example, got plain green paint to contrast with well-detailed decorations and pannos around them.

A typical layout of the cheap shallow-dug metro station (which quickly became known as Sorokonozhka – "centipede", from early designs with 40 concrete columns in two rows) was developed for all new stations, and the stations were built to look almost identical, differing from each other only in colours of the marble and ceramic tiles. Most stations were built with simpler, cheap technology; this resulted in utilitarian design being flawed in some ways. Some stations such as adjacent Rechnoi Vokzal and Vodny Stadion or sequential Leninsky Prospect, Akadmicheskaya, Profsoyuznaya and Novye Cheryomushki would have a similar look due to the extensive use of same-sized white or off-white ceramic tiles with hard-to-feel differences.

Walls with cheap ceramic tiles were susceptible to train-related vibration: some tiles would eventually fall off and break. It was not always possible to replace the missing tiles with the ones of the exact color and tone, which eventually led to variegated parts of the walls.

==== Metro stations of late USSR ====
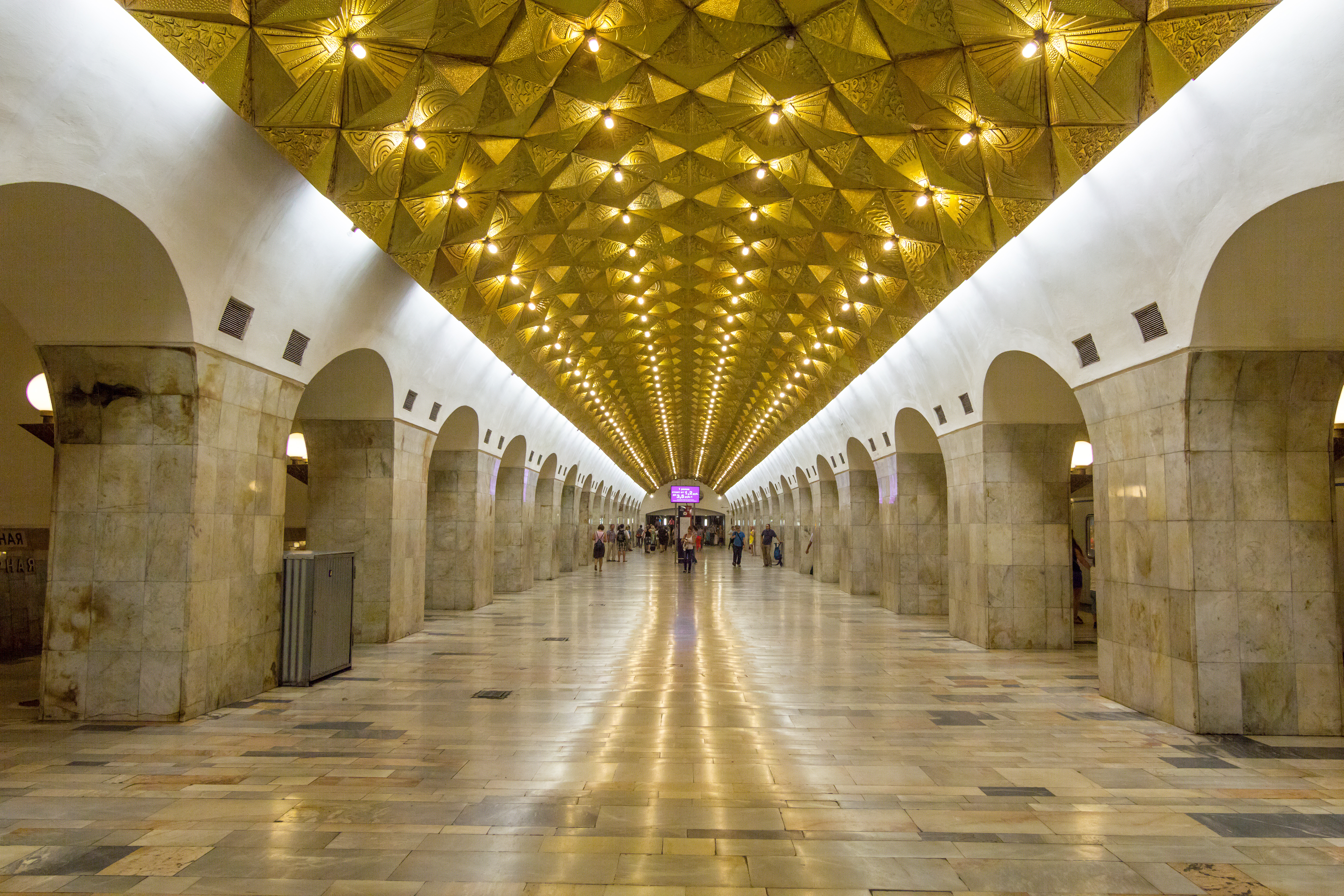
Aviamotornaya (1979), Line 8

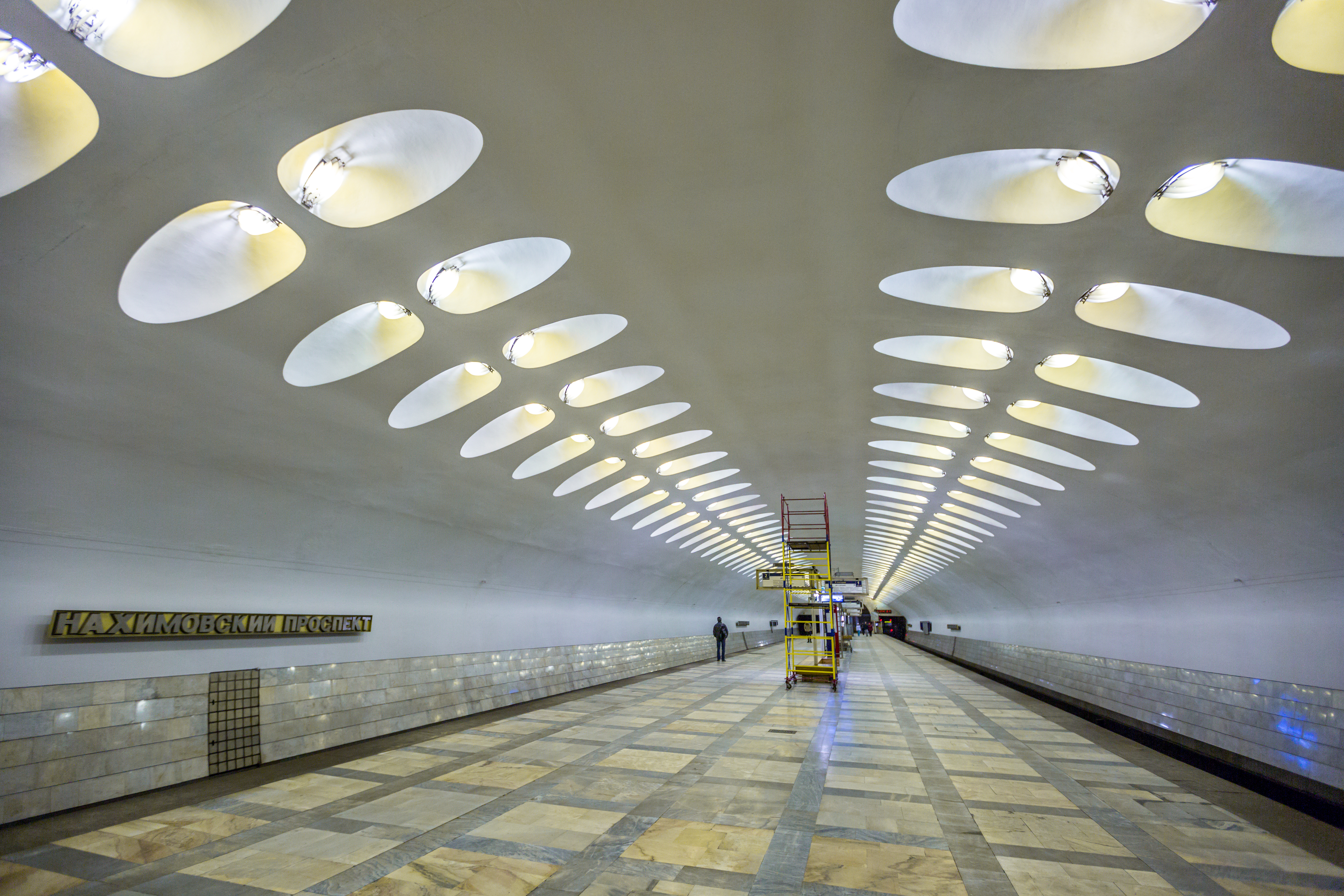
Nakhimovsky Prospekt (1983), Line 9

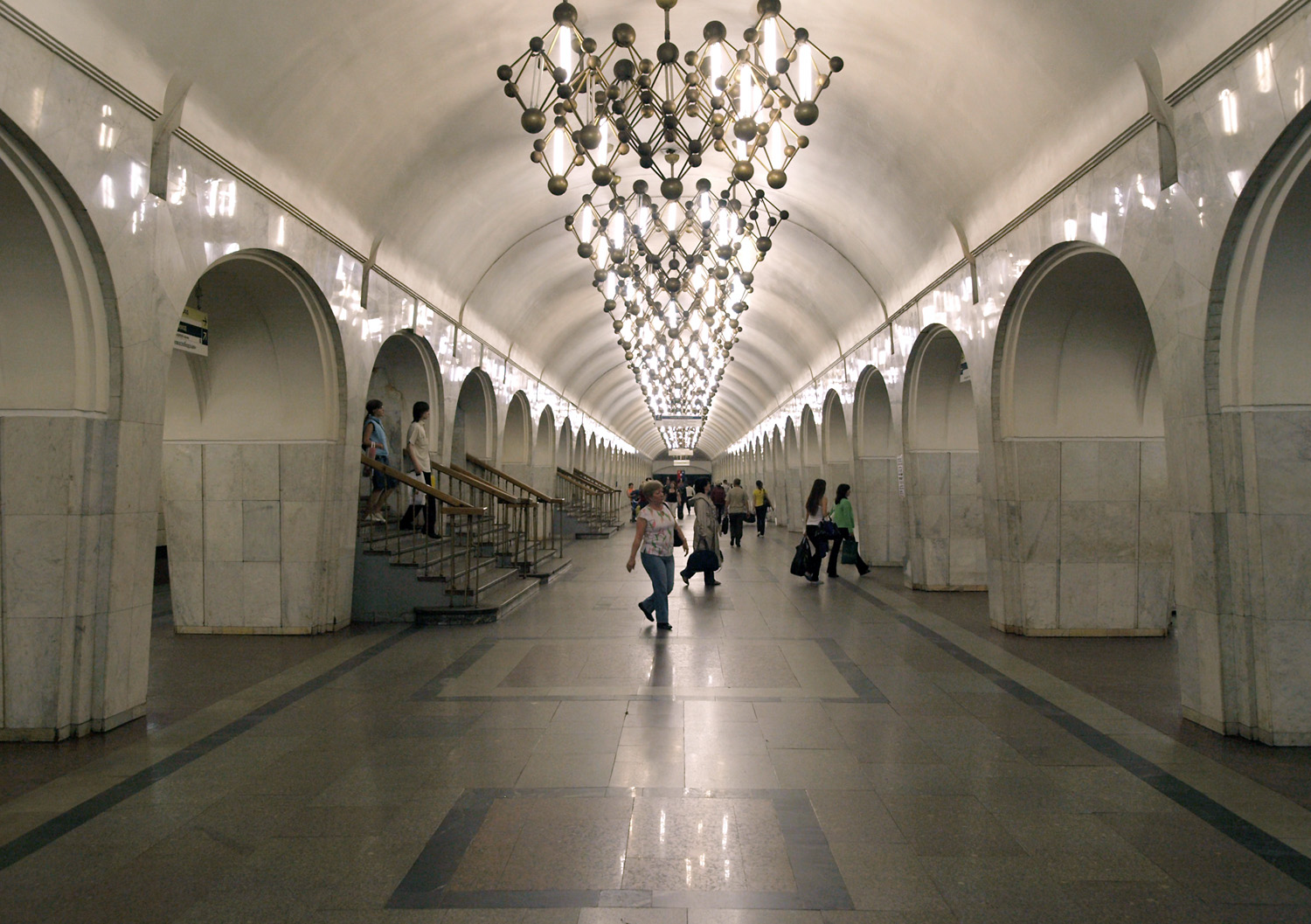
Mendeleyevskaya (1988), Line 9.

The contrasting style gap between the powerfully decorated stations of Moscow's center and the spartan-looking stations of the 1960s was eventually filled. In the mid-1970s the architectural extravagance was partially restored. However, the newer design of shallow "centipede" stations (now with 26 columns, more widely spaced) continued to dominate. For example, Kaluzhskaya "centipede" station from 1974 (adjacent to Novye Cheryomushki station) features non-flat tiles (with 3D effect utilized), and Medvedkovo from 1978 features complex decorations.

1971 station Kitay-Gorod ("Ploshchad Nogina" at the time) features cross-platform interchange (Line 6 and line 7). Although built without "centipede" design or cheap ceramic tiles, the station utilizes near-grayscale selection of colors. It is to note the "southbound" and "northbound" halls of the station have identical look.

Babushkinskaya station from 1978 is a no-column station (similar to Biblioteka Imeni Lenina from 1935). 1983 Chertanovskaya station has resemblance to Kropotkinskaya (from 1935). Some stations, such as the deep-dug Shabolovskaya (1980), have the near-tunnel walls decorated with metal sheets, not tiles. Tyoply Stan features a theme related to the name and the location of the station ("Tyoply Stan" used to literally mean warm area): its walls are covered in brick-colored ribbed panes, which look like radiators).

Downtown area got such stations as Borovitskaya (1986), with uncovered red bricks and gray, concrete-like colors accompanying a single gold-plated decorative pane known as "Tree of peoples' of USSR" or additional station hall for Tretyakovskaya to house cross-platform interchange system between line 6 and line 8. To this day, Tretyakovskaya metro station consists of two contrasting halls: brutalistic 1971 hall and custom design hall from 1986 reminiscent of Tretyakovskaya Galereya museum located within walking distance.

=== Post-USSR stations of the modern Russian Federation ===
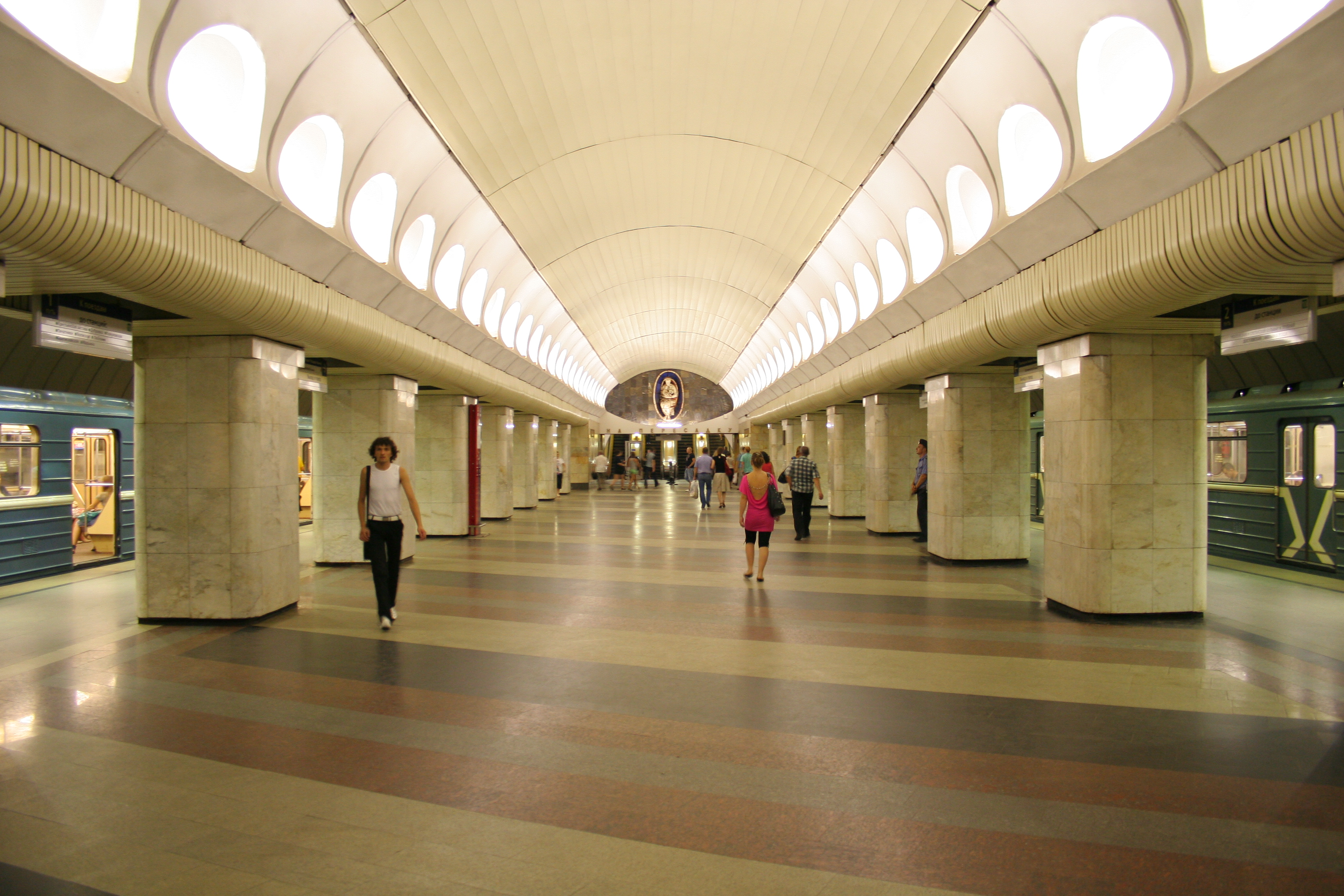
Rimskaya (1995), Line 10

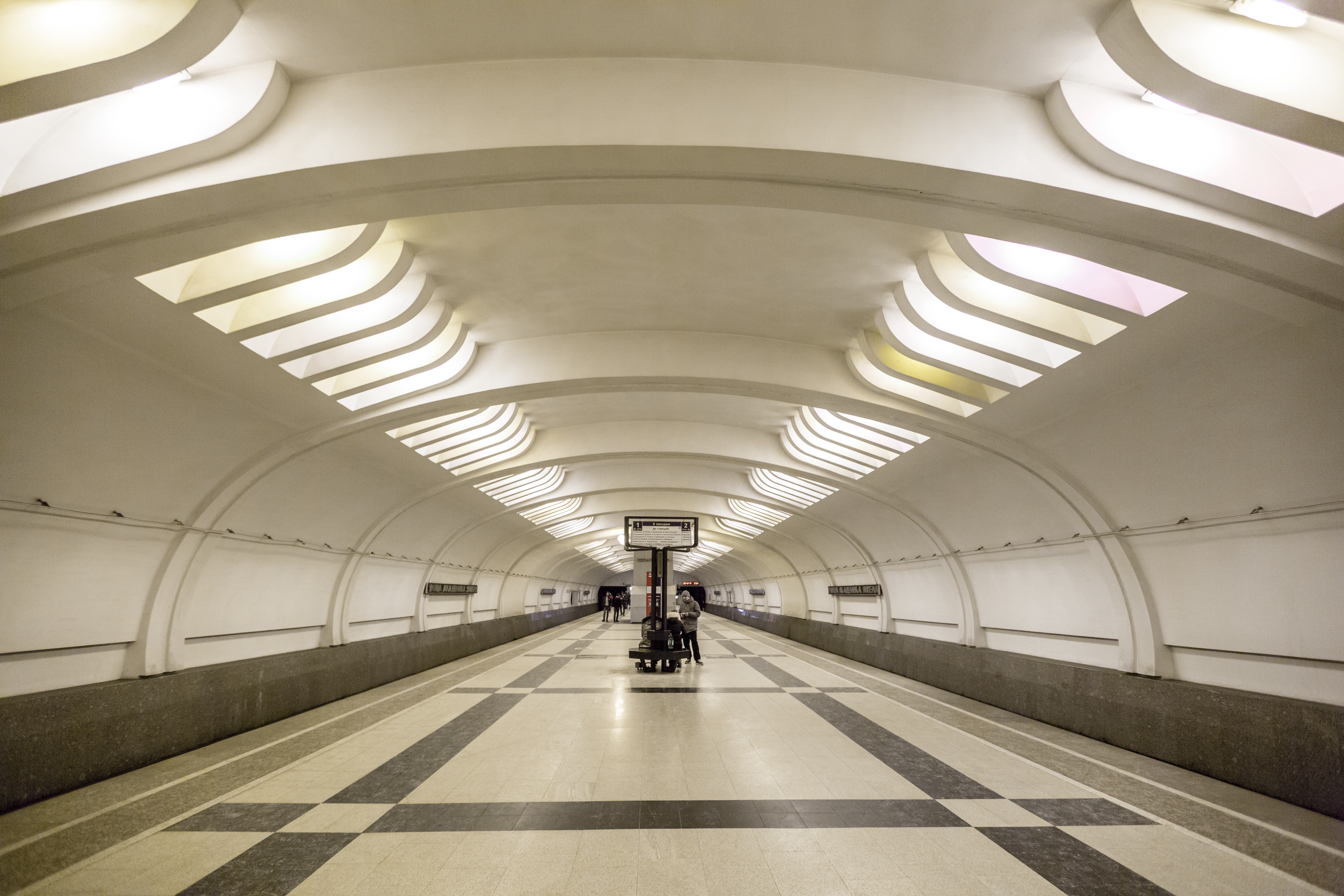
Ulitsa Akademika Yangelya (2000), Line 9

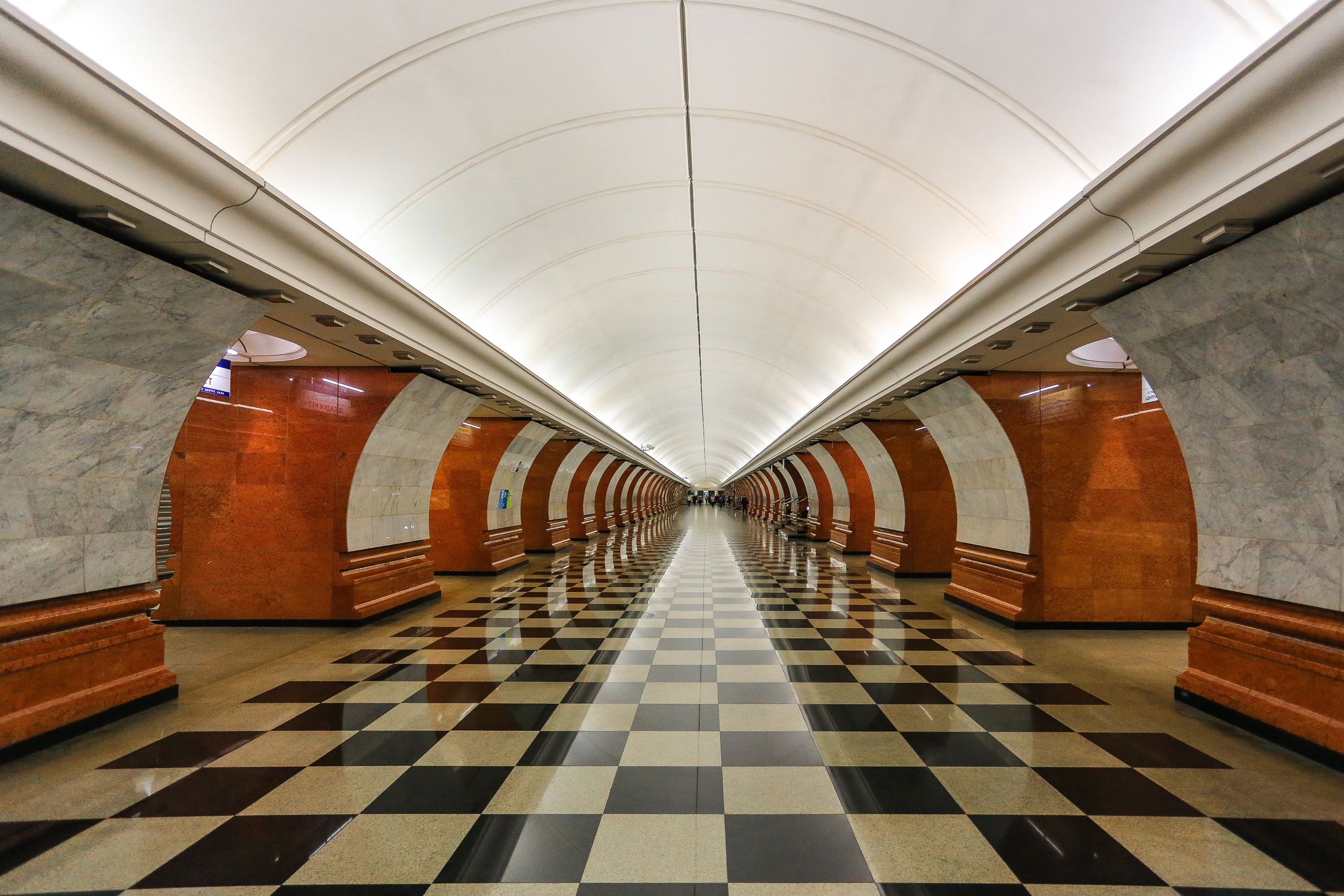
Park Pobedy (2003), Lines 3 & 8.

Stations bults in 1990s and early 2000s
- Ulitsa Akademika Yangelya station used to feature thick orange neon lamp-like sodium lights instead of regular white lights.
- Park Pobedy, the deepest station of the Moscow Metro, was built in 2003; it features extensive use of dark orange polished granite.
- Slavyansky Bulvar station utilizes a plant-inspired theme (similar to "bionic style").
- The sleek variant of aforementioned bionic style is somewhat represented in various Line 10 stations.
- Sretensky Bulvar station of line 10 is decorated with paintings of nearby memorials and locations.
- Strogino station has a theme of huge eye-shaped boundaries for lights; with "eyes" occupying the station's ceiling.
- Troparyovo (2014) features trees made of polished metal. The trees hold the station's diamond-shaped lights. The station, however, is noticeably dim-lit.
- Delovoy Tsentr (2016, MCC, overground station) has green tint.
- Lomonosovsky Prospekt (Line 8A) is decorated with various equations.
- Olkhovaya (2019) uses other plant-inspired themes (ольха noun means alder) with autumn/winter inspired colours.
- Kosino (2019) uses high-tech style with the addition of thin LED lights.

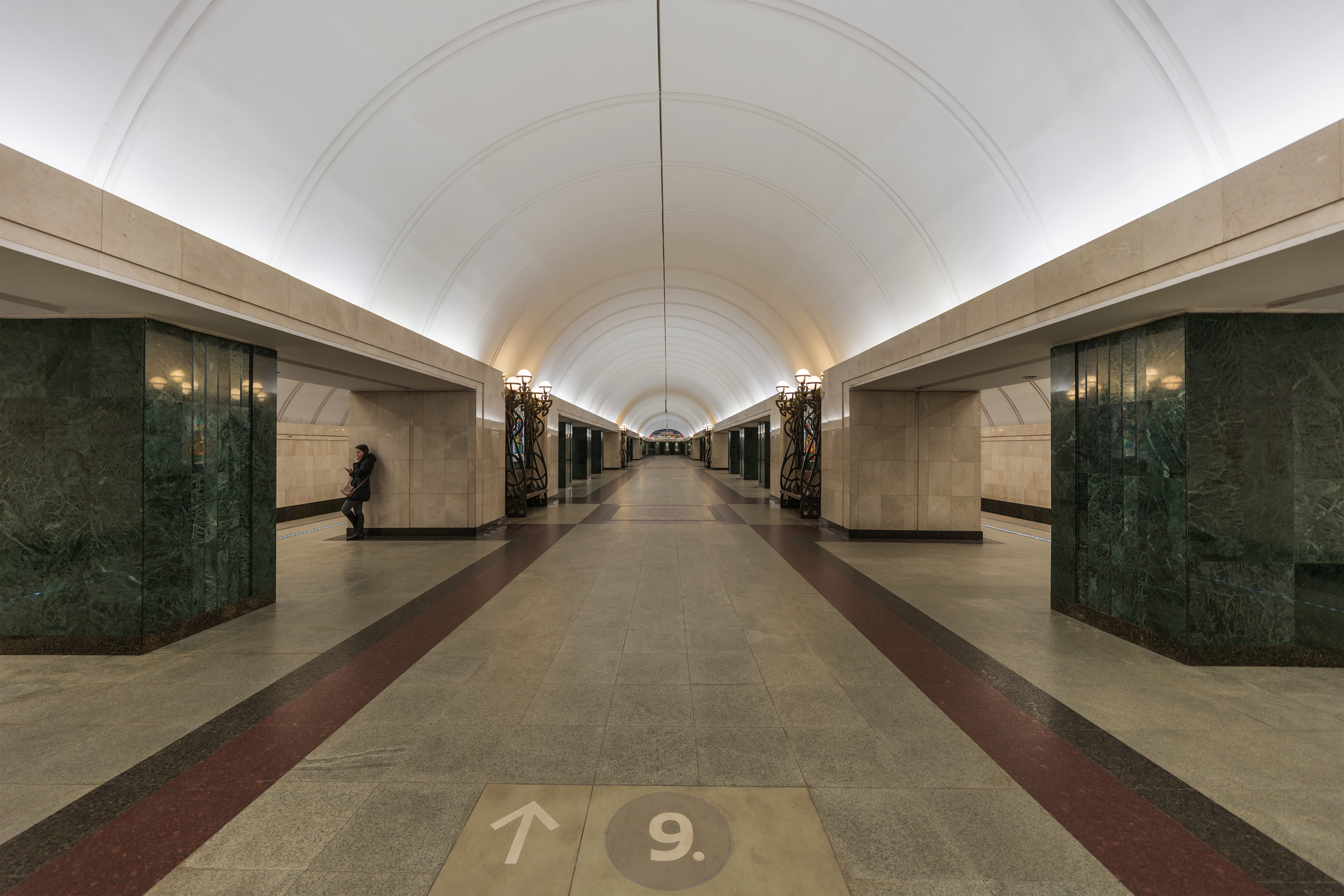
Trubnaya (2010), Line 10

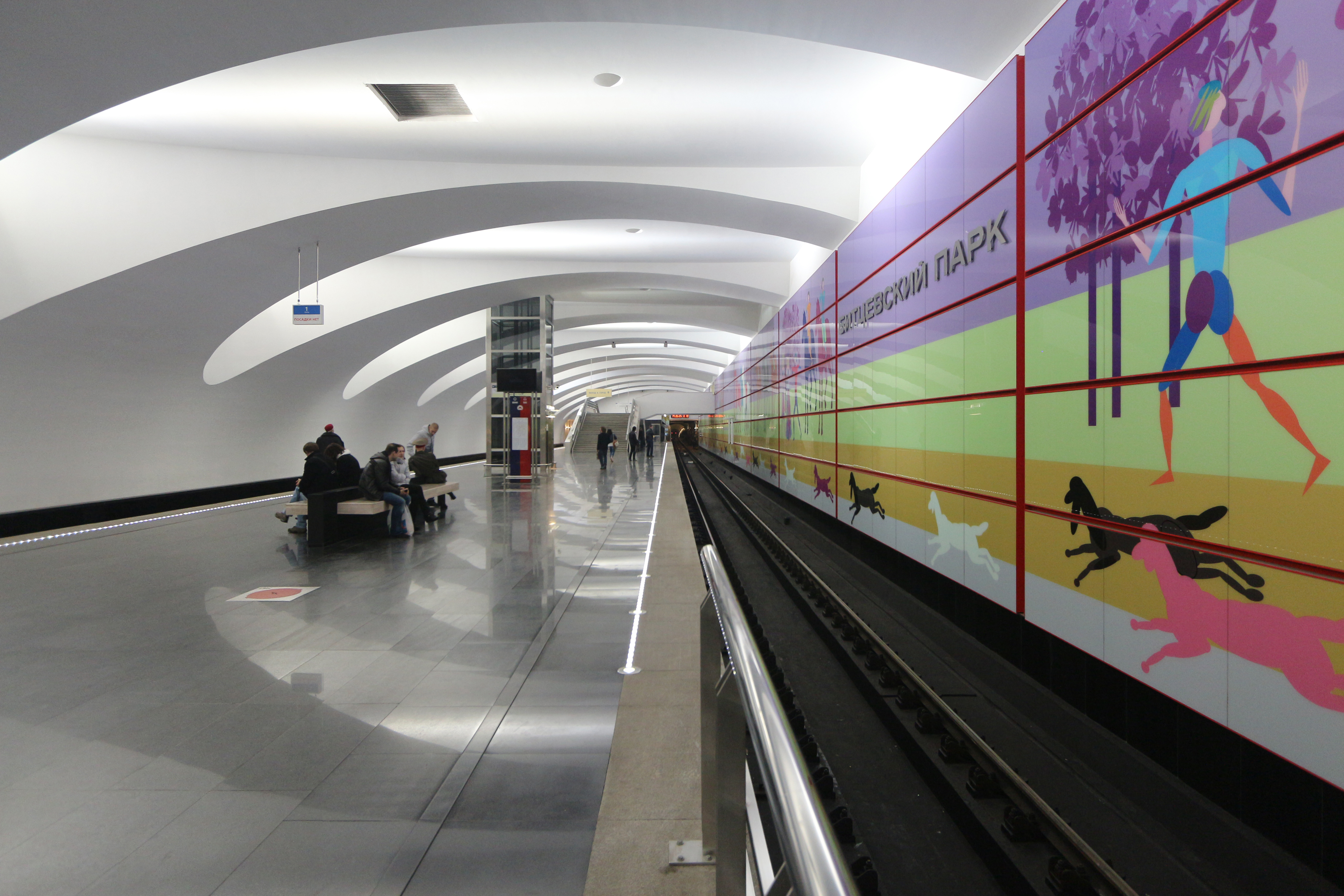
Bittsevsky Park (2014), Line 12

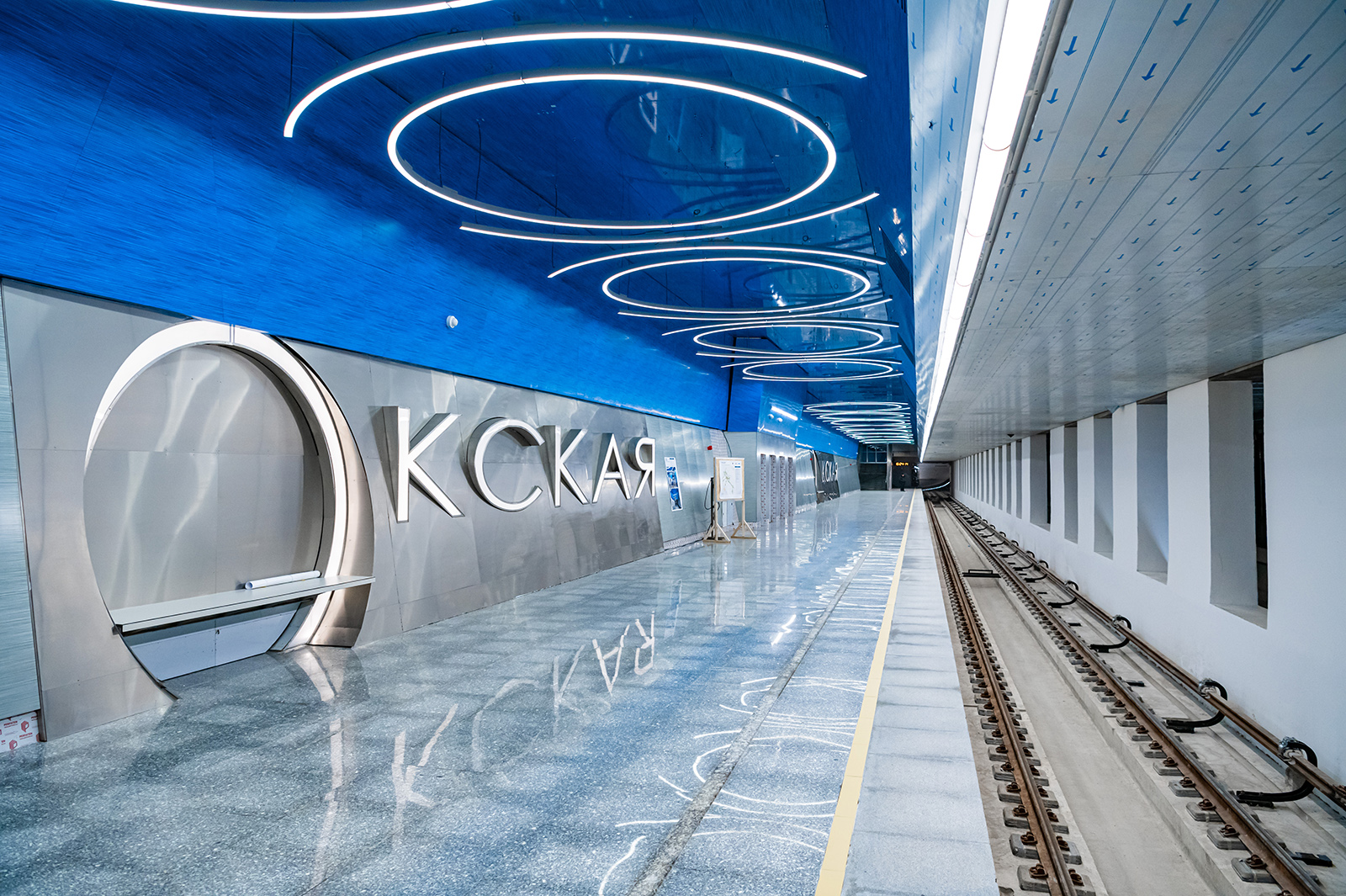
Okskaya (2020), Line 15

Stations bults in 2010's and 2020's

Some bleak, bland-looking "centipedes" like Akademicheskaya and Yugo-Zapadnaya have undergone renovations in the 21st century (new blue-striped white walls on Akademicheskaya, aqualine glassy, shiny walls on Yugo-Zapadnaya).

==== Moscow Central Circle urban railway (Line 14) ====
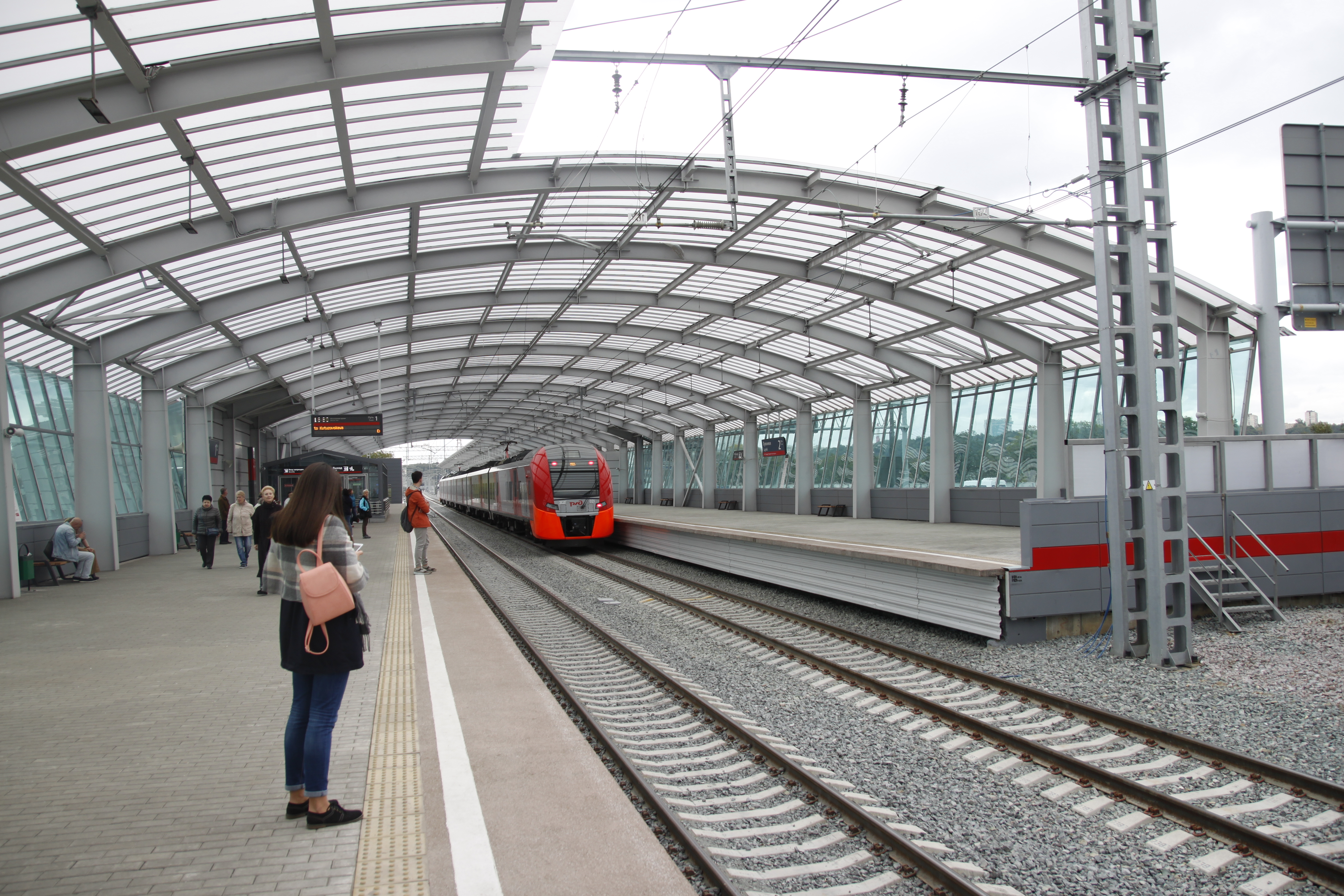
Luzhniki MCC station

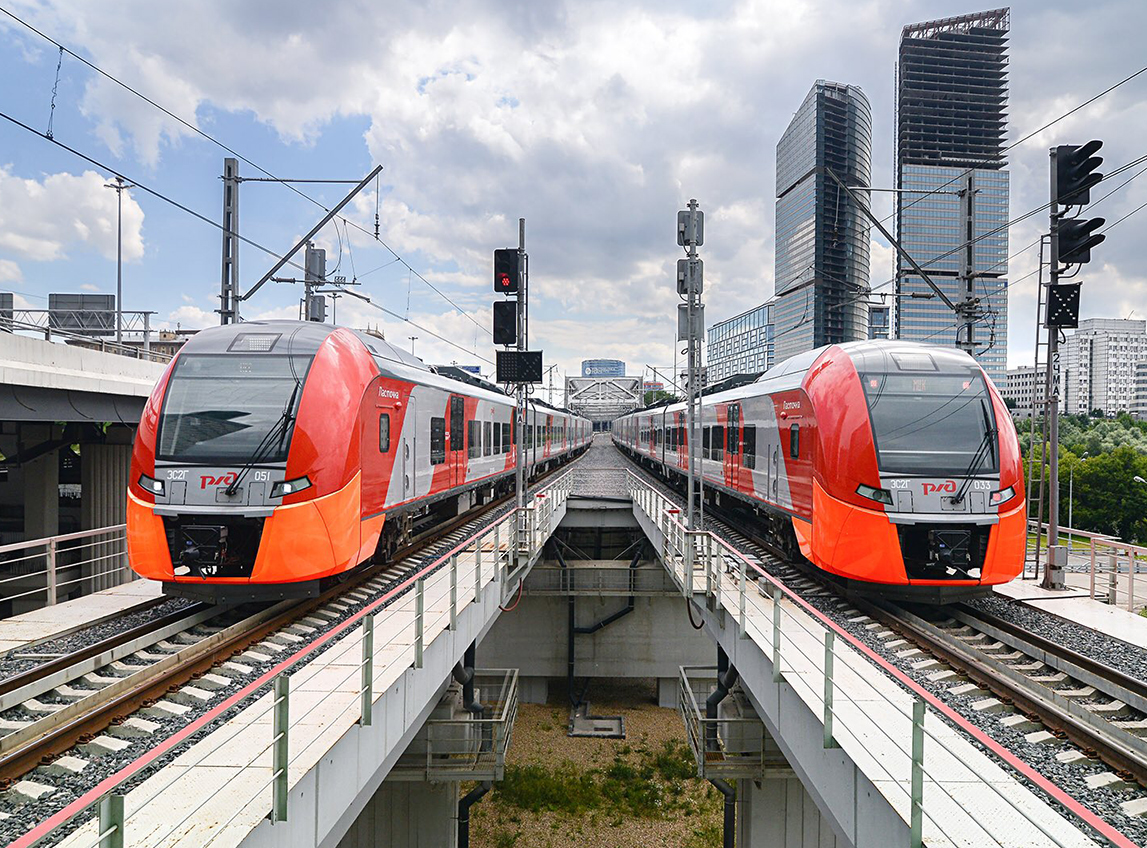
"Lastochka" trains

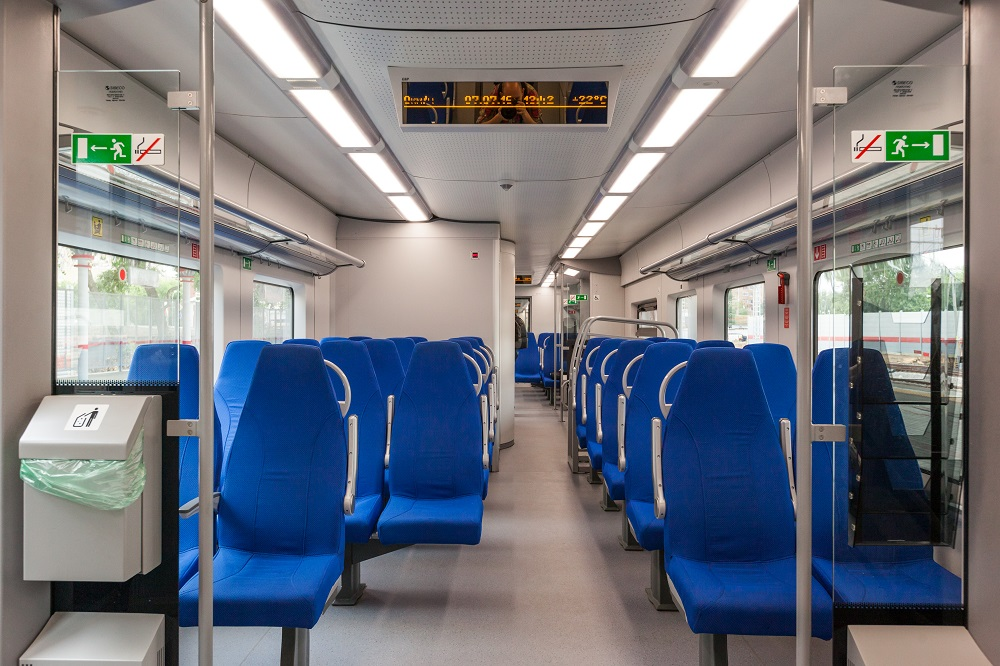
Seats in "Lastochka" trains

A new circle metro line in Moscow was relatively quickly made in the 2010s. The Moscow Central Circle line (Line 14) was opened for use in September 2016 by re-purposing and upgrading the Maloe ZheleznoDorozhnoe Kol'tso. A proposal to convert that freight line into a metropolitan railway with frequent passenger service was announced in 2012. The original tracks had been built in pre-revolutionary Moscow decades before the creation of Moscow Metro; the tracks remained in place in one piece as a non-electrified line until the 21st century. Yet the circle route was never abandoned or cut. New track (along the existing one) was laid and all-new stations were built between 2014 and 2016. MCC's stations got such amenities as vending machines and free water closets.

Line 14 is operated by Russian Railways and uses full-sized trains (an idea, somewhat similar to S-Train). The extra resemblance to an S-Train line is, the 1908 line now connects modern northern residential districts to western and southern downtown area, with a station adjacent to Moscow International Business Center.

There is a noticeable relief of congestion, decrease in usage of formerly overcrowded Koltsevaya line since the introduction of MCC. To make line 14 attractive to frequent Koltsevaya line interchanges users, upgrades over regular comfort of Moscow Metro were made. Use of small laptops/portable video playing devices and food consumption from tupperwares and tubs was also improved for Line 14: the trains have small folding tables in the back of nearly every seat, while the seats are facing one direction like in planes or intercity buses - unlike side-against-side sofas typical for Metro.

Unlike MCD lines (D1, D2 etc.) MCC line accepts "unified" tickets and "Troika" cards just like Moscow Metro and buses of Moscow do. Free transfers are permitted between the MCC and the Moscow Metro if the trip before the transfer is less than 90 minutes. It's made possible by using same "Ediny", literally "unified" tickets instead of printing "paper tickets" used at railroads.

- To interchange to line 14 for free, passenger must keep their freshly used ticket after entering Moscow Metro to apply it upon entering any line 14 station (and vice versa, keep their "fresh" ticket to enter underground Metro line after leaving Line 14 for an interchange).

=== MCD (D lines) ===
In 2019, new lines of Russian Railways got included in the map of Metro as "line D1" and "line D2". Unlike Line 14, the MCD lines actually form S-Train lines, bypassing the "vokzals", terminus stations of respective intercity railways. Line D3 is planned to be launched in August 2023, while D4 will be launched in September of that year. The schedule for the development of the infrastructure of the Central Transport Hub in 2023 was signed by the Moscow Mayor Sergei Sobyanin and the head of Russian Railways Oleg Belozerov in December 2022.

As for the fees, MCD accepts Moscow's "Troika" cards. Also, every MCD station has printers which print "station X – station Y" tickets on paper. Users of the D lines must keep their tickets until exiting their destination stations: their exit terminals require a valid "... to station Y" ticket's barcode.

==== Big Circle Line (line 11) ====
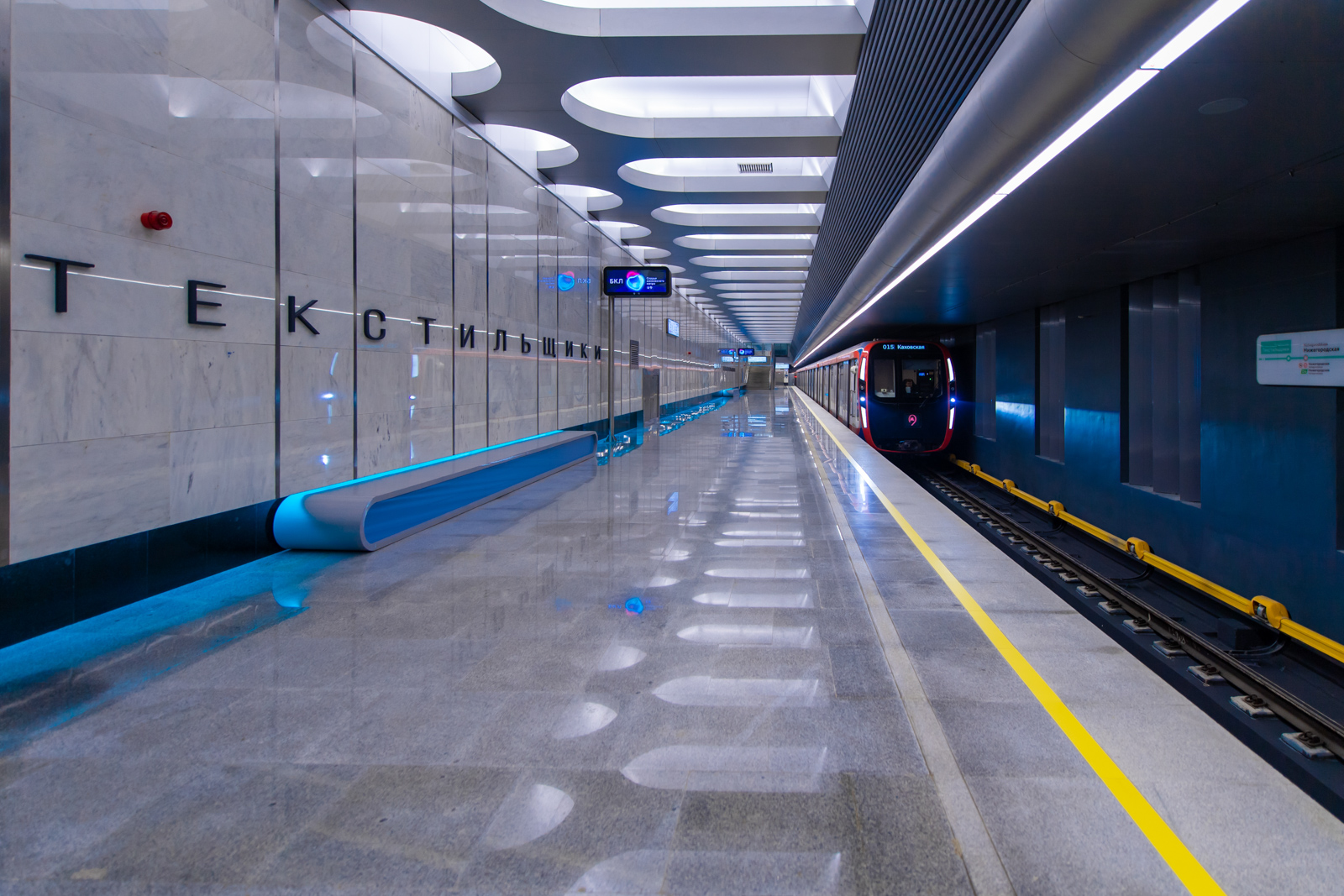
Tekstilshchiki (2023) with a futuristic design

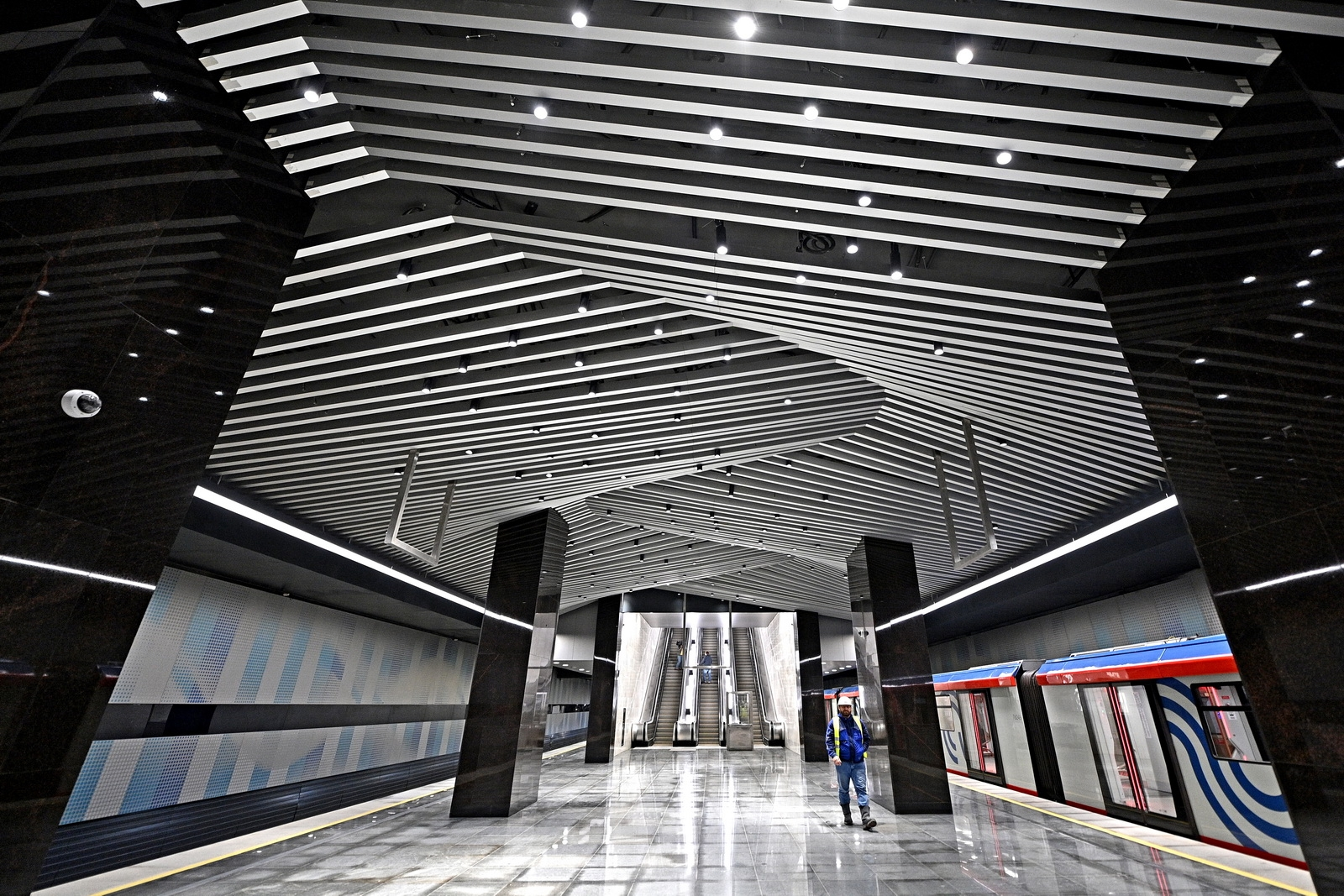
Aminyevskaya (2021) in a stripy style

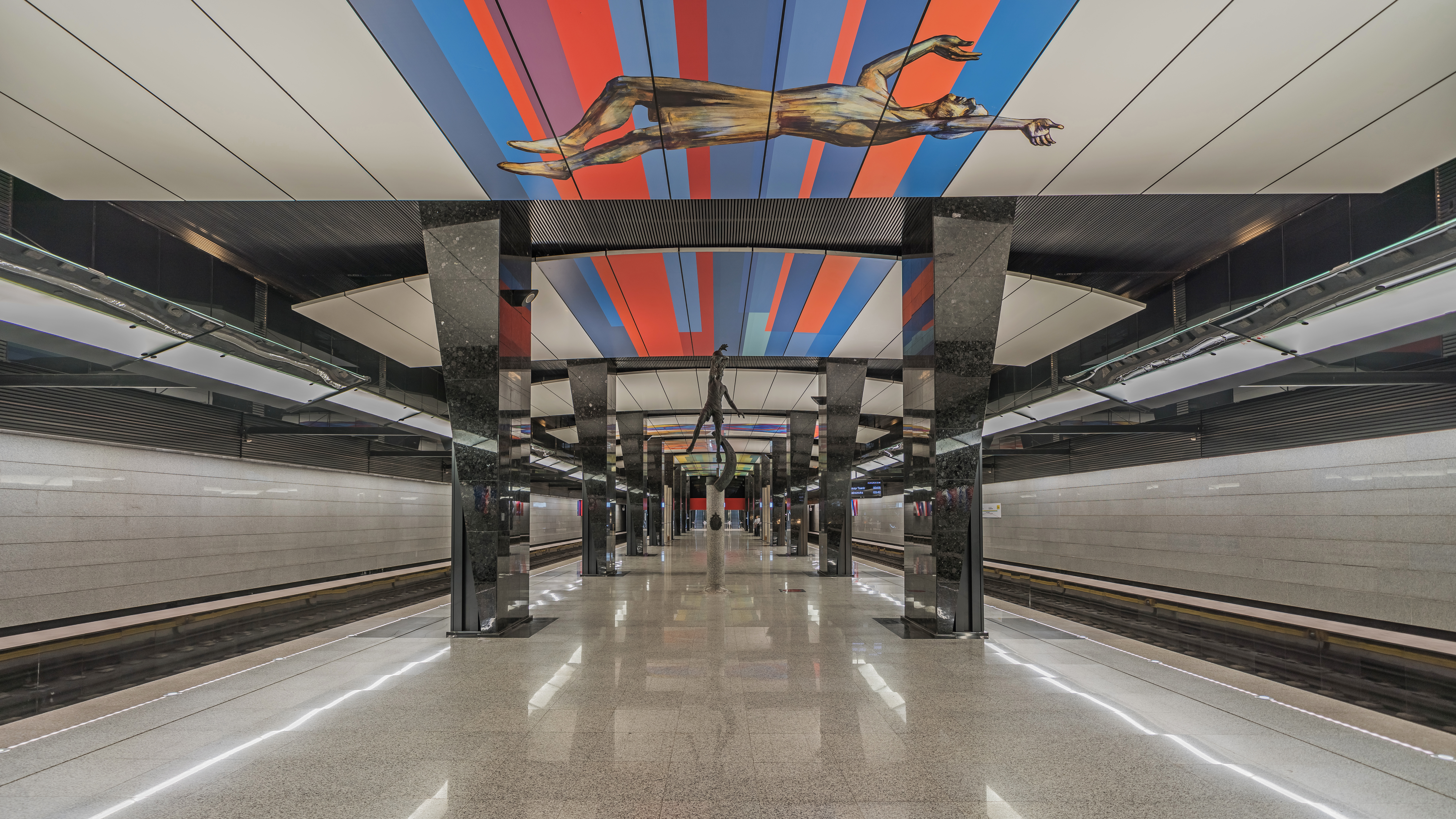
CSKA (2018) with sport-themed frescos

After upgrading the railway from 1908 to a proper Metro line, the development of another circle route was re-launched, now adjusted for the pear-shaped circle route of line #14.

Throughout the late 2010s, Line 11 was extended from short, tiny Kakhovskaya line to a half-circle (from Kakhovskaya to Savyolovskaya). In early 2023, the circle was finished.

- Similarly made Shelepikha, Khoroshovskaya, CSKA and Petrovsky Park stations have lots of polished granite and shiny surfaces, in contrast to Soviet "centipedes". Throughout 2018–2021, these stations were connected to line 8A.
- Narodnoye Opolcheniye (2021) features lots of straight edges and linear decorations (such as uninterrupted "three stripes" style of the ceiling lights and rectangular columns).

As for the spring of 2023, the whole circle route line is up and running, forming a circle stretching to the southern near-MKAD residential parts of the city (Prospekt Vernadskogo, Tekstilshchiki) as opposed to the MCC's stretching towards the northern districts of Moscow. In other words, BCL "mirrors" MCC, avoiding forming a perfect circle around the city centre. While being 57.5 km (35.7 mi) long, it is now the second longest circular subway line in the world, 2.4 km (1.5 mi) shorter than Line 12 of Wuhan Metro.

== Expansions ==
Data

GIF-animated scheme of Moscow Metro growth (1935–2019)

Since the turn of the 2nd millennium several projects have been completed, and more are underway. The first was the Annino-Butovo extension, which extended the Serpukhovsko-Timiryazevskaya Line from Prazhskaya to Ulitsa Akademika Yangelya in 2000, Annino in 2001 and Bulvar Dmitriya Donskogo in 2002. Its continuation, an elevated Butovskaya Line, was inaugurated in 2003. Vorobyovy Gory station, which initially opened in 1959 and was forced to close in 1983 after the concrete used to build the bridge was found to be defective, was rebuilt and reopened after many years in 2002. Another recent project included building a branch off the Filyovskaya Line to the Moscow International Business Center. This included Vystavochnaya (opened in 2005) and Mezhdunarodnaya (opened in 2006).

The Strogino–Mitino extension began with Park Pobedy in 2003. Its first stations (an expanded Kuntsevskaya and Strogino) opened in January 2008, and Slavyansky Bulvar followed in September. Myakinino, Volokolamskaya and Mitino opened in December 2009. Myakinino station was built by a state-private financial partnership, unique in Moscow Metro history. A new terminus, Pyatnitskoye Shosse, was completed in December 2012.

After many years of construction, the long-awaited Lyublinskaya Line extension was inaugurated with Trubnaya in August 2007 and Sretensky Bulvar in December of that year. In June 2010, it was extended northwards with the Dostoyevskaya and Maryina Roscha stations. In December 2011, the Lyublinskaya Line was expanded southwards by three stations and connected to the Zamoskvoretskaya Line, with the Alma-Atinskaya station opening on the latter in December 2012. The Kalininskaya Line was extended past the Moscow Ring Road in August 2012 with Novokosino station.

In 2011, works began on the Third Interchange Contour that is set to take the pressure off the Koltsevaya Line. Eventually the new line will attain a shape of the second ring with connections to all lines (except Koltsevaya and Butovskaya).

In 2013, the Tagansko-Krasnopresnenskaya Line was extended after several delays to the south-eastern districts of Moscow outside the Ring Road with the opening of Zhulebino and Lermontovsky Prospekt stations. Originally scheduled for 2013, a new segment of the Kalininskaya Line between Park Pobedy and Delovoy Tsentr (separate from the main part) was opened in January 2014, while the underground extension of Butovskaya Line northwards to offer a transfer to the Kaluzhsko-Rizhskaya Line was completed in February. Spartak, a station on the Tagansko-Krasnopresnenskaya Line that remained unfinished for forty years, was finally opened in August 2014. The first stage of the southern extension of the Sokolnicheskaya Line, the Troparyovo station, opened in December 2014.

=== Current plans ===
In addition to major metro expansion the Moscow Government and Russian Railways plans to upgrade more commuter railways to a metro-style service, similar to the MCC. New tracks and stations are planned to be built in order to achieve this.

List of expansion projects of Moscow Metro by date
Line	Terminals		Length (km)	Stations	Status	Planned opening
Lyublinsko-Dmitrovskaya line	Yuzhny Port		0	1	Under planning	2030
Arbatsko-Pokrovskaya line	Shchyolkovskaya	Golyanovo	1.5	1	Under construction	2028
Biryulyovskaya line	ZIL	Biryulyovo	22.2	10	Under construction	2028+
Koltsevaya line	Dostoevskaya		0	1	Under construction	2030
Troitskaya line	Novomoskovskaya	Troitsk		6	Under planning	2028–2029
Rublyovo-Arkhangelskaya line	Bulvar Generala Karbysheva	Novorizhskaya		5	Under construction	2028–2029
Kalininskaya line	Tretyakovskaya	Delovoy Tsentr	5.1	3	Under planning	

== Stations ==
Of the metro's 250 stations, 88 are deep underground, 123 are shallow, 12 are surface-level and 5 are elevated. The deep stations comprise 55 triple-vaulted pylon stations, 19 triple-vaulted column stations, and one single-vault station. The shallow stations comprise 79 spanned column stations (a large portion of them following the "centipede" design), 33 single-vaulted stations (Kharkov technology), and four single-spanned stations. In addition, there are 12 ground-level stations, four elevated stations, and one station (Vorobyovy Gory) on a bridge. Two stations have three tracks, and one has double halls. Seven of the stations have side platforms (only one of which is subterranean). In addition, there were two temporary stations within rail yards.

The stations being constructed under Stalin's regime, in the style of socialist classicism, were meant as underground "palaces of the people". Stations such as Komsomolskaya, Kiyevskaya or Mayakovskaya and others built after 1935 in the second phase of the evolution of the network are tourist landmarks: their photogenic architecture, large chandeliers and detailed decoration are unusual for an urban transport system of the twentieth century.

The stations opened in the 21st century are influenced by an international and more neutral style with improved technical quality.

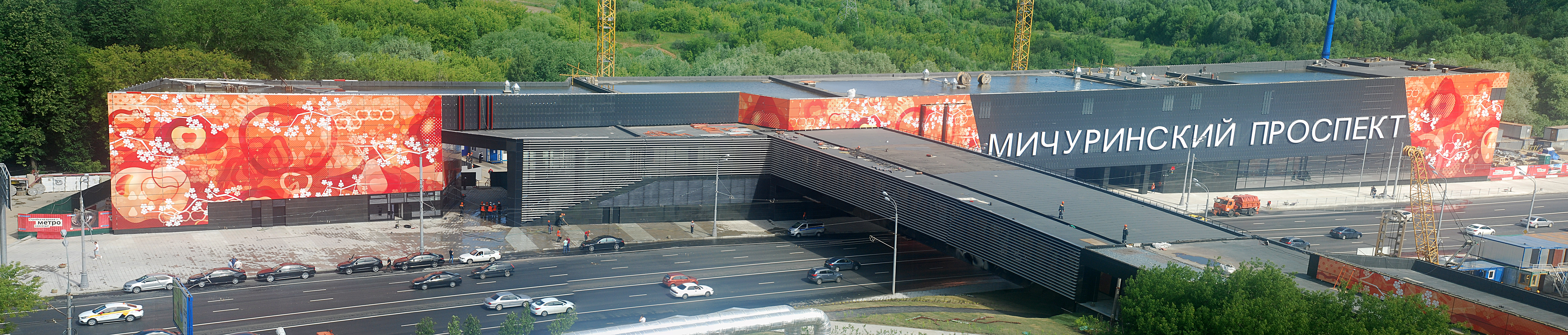
Michurinsky Prospekt is the first semi-underground station in the Moscow Metro
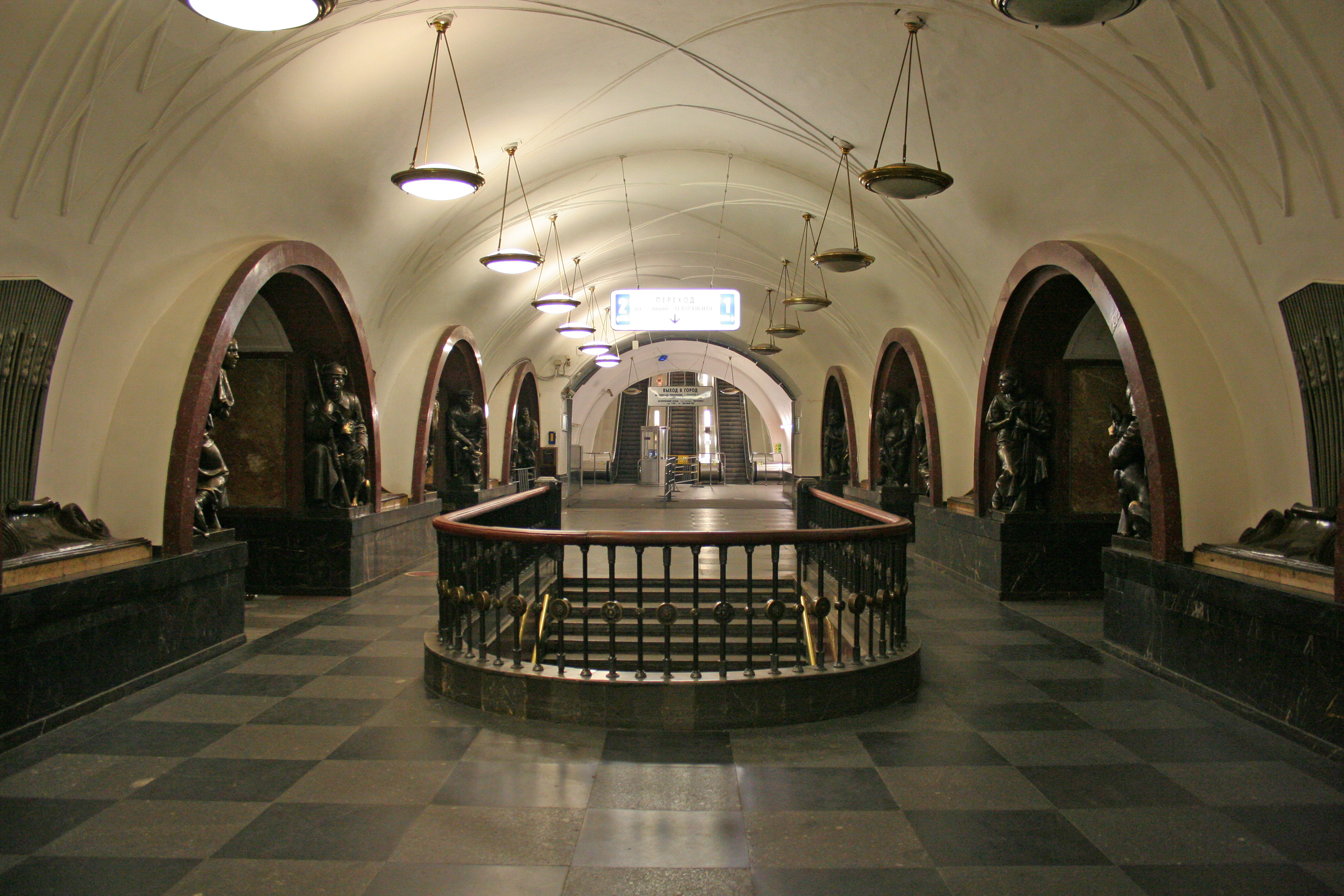
Ploshchad Revolyutsii (1938)

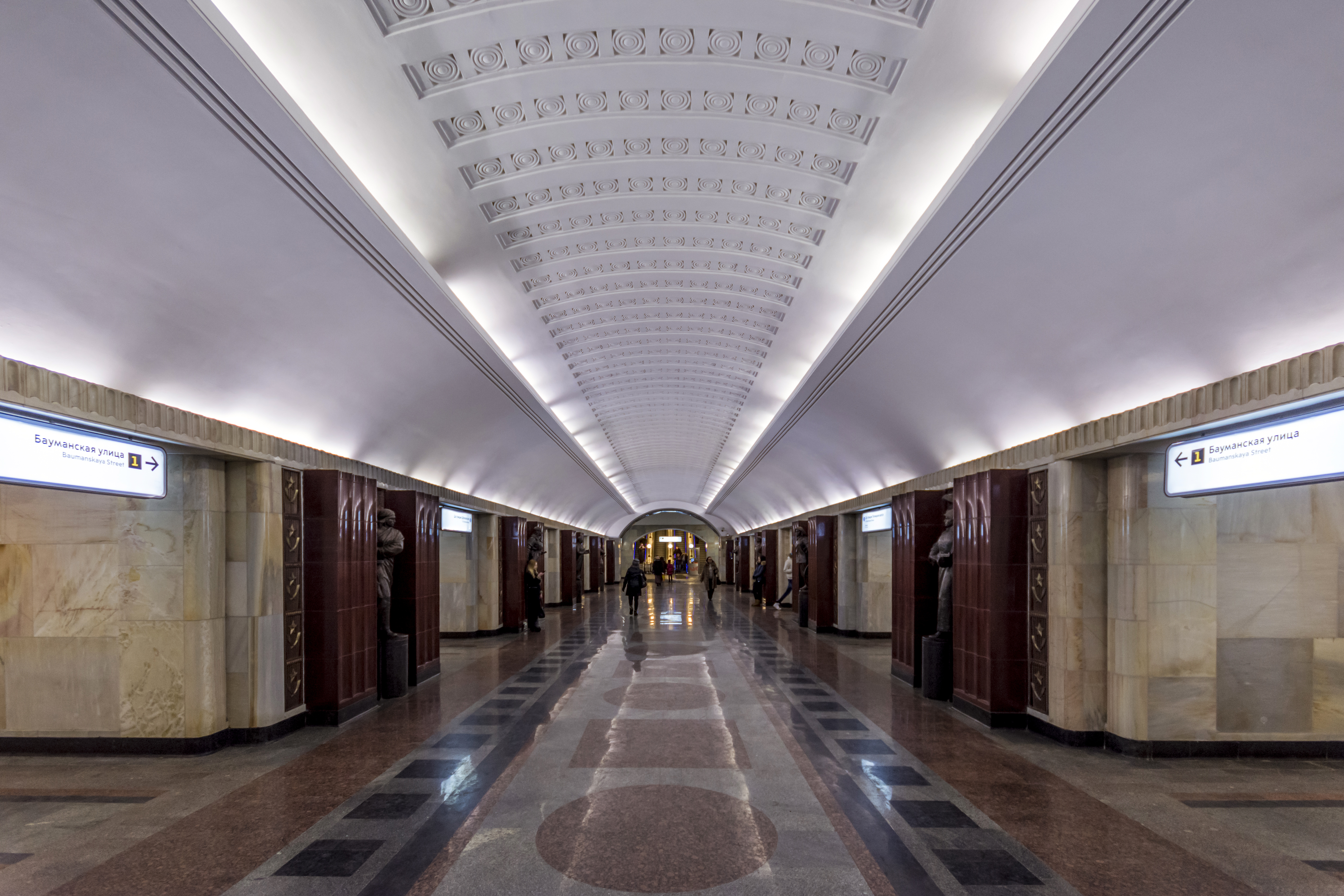
Baumanskaya (1944)

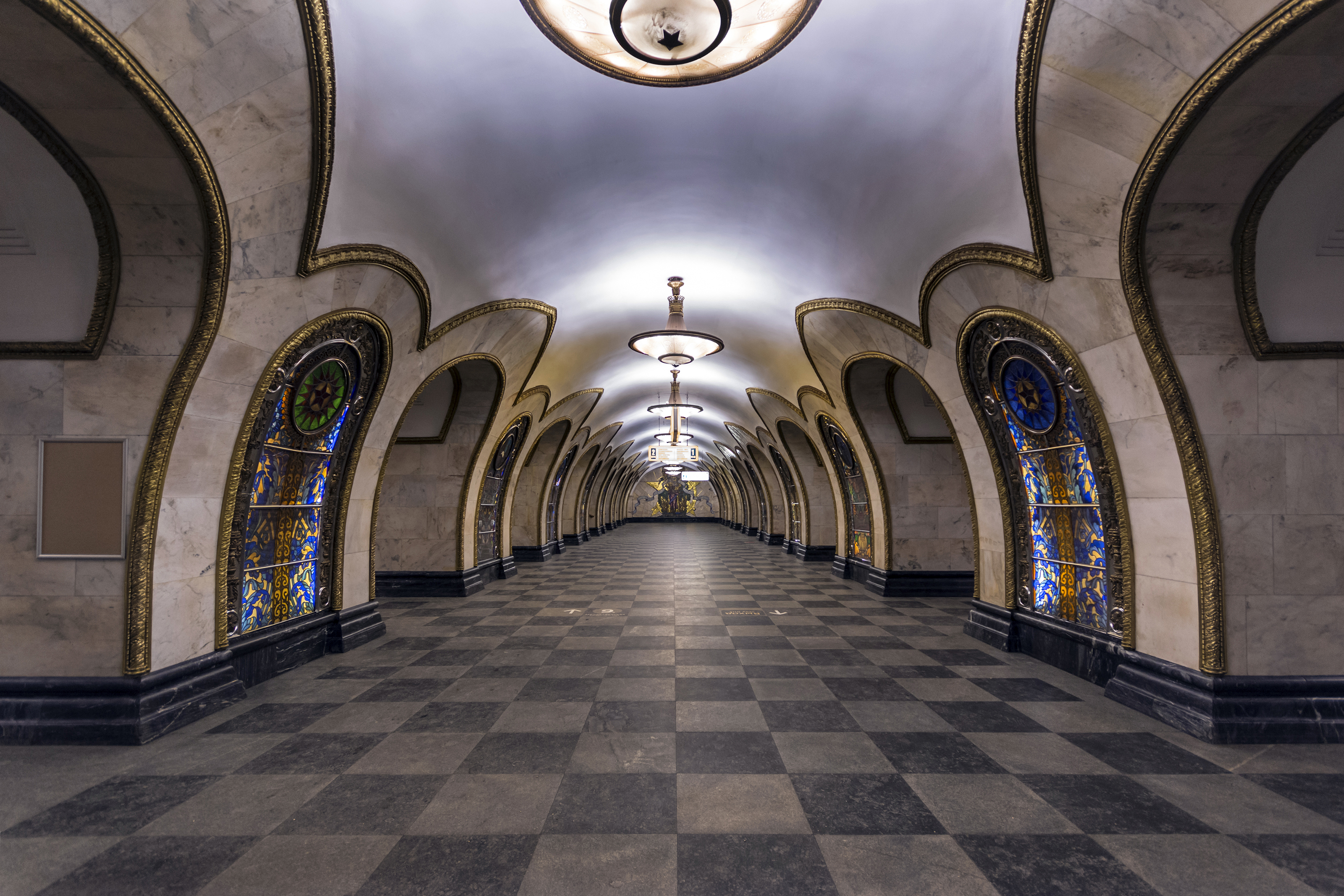
Novoslobodskaya (1952)

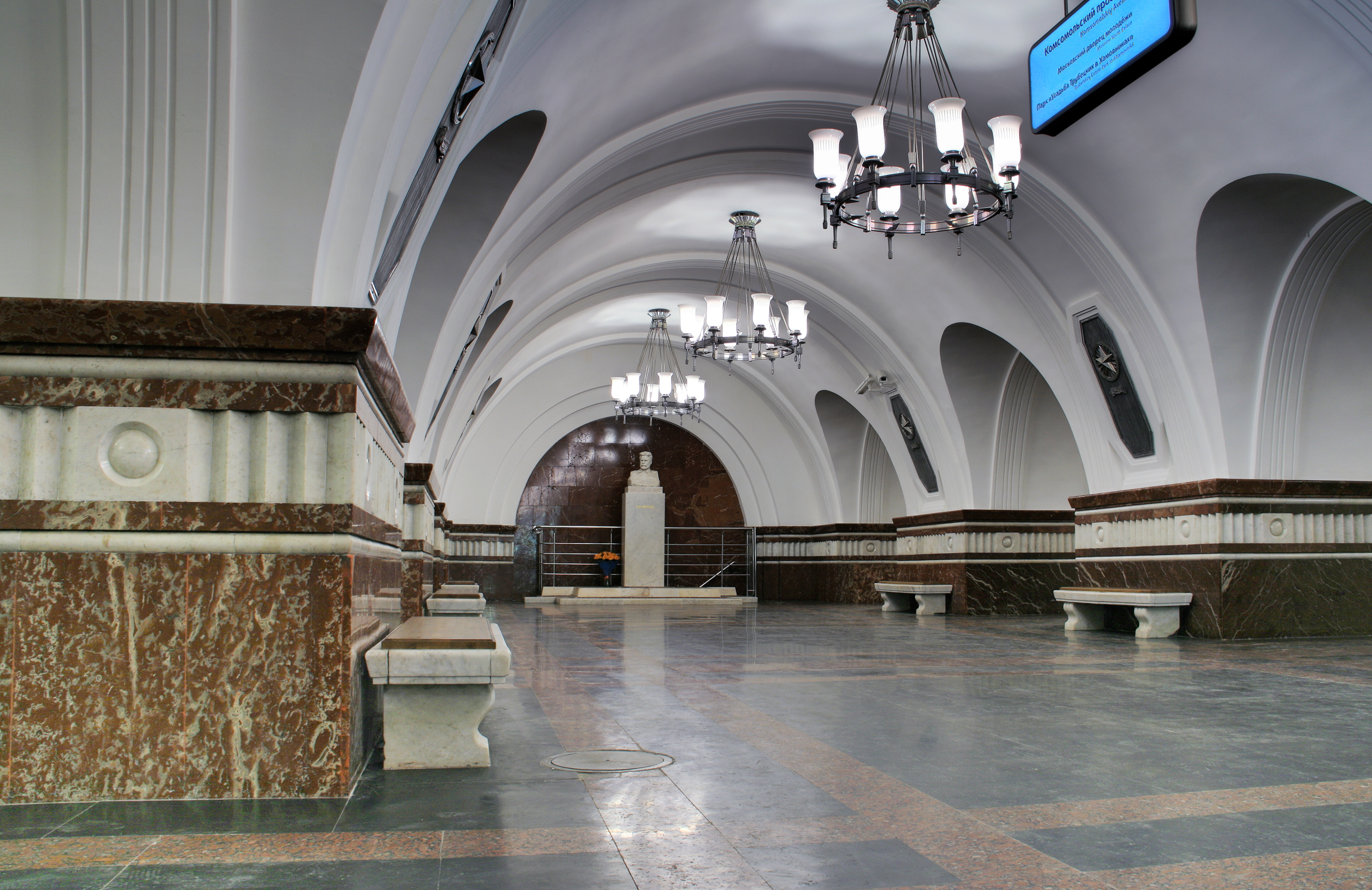
Frunzenskaya (1957)

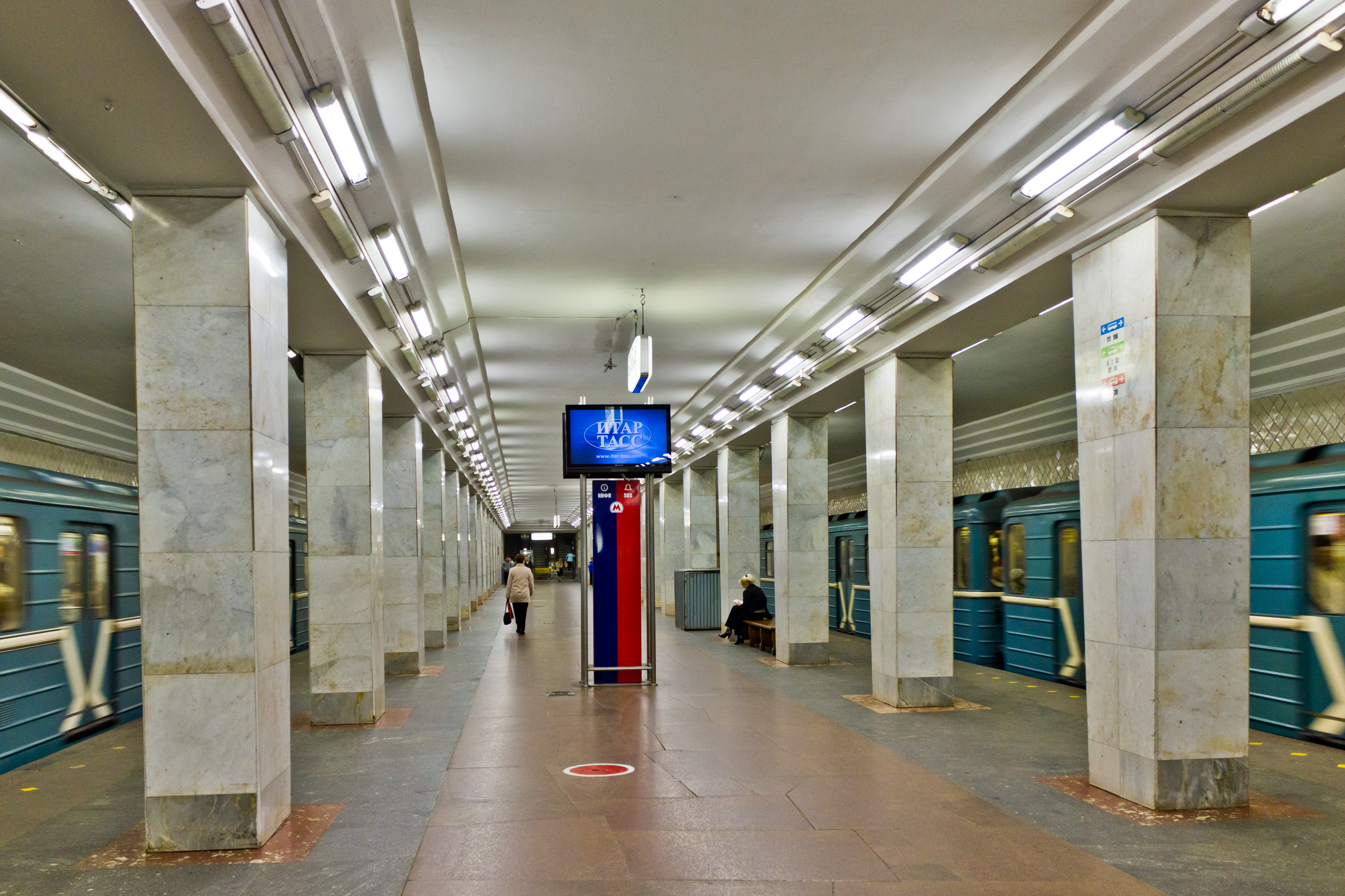
Leninsky Prospekt (1962)

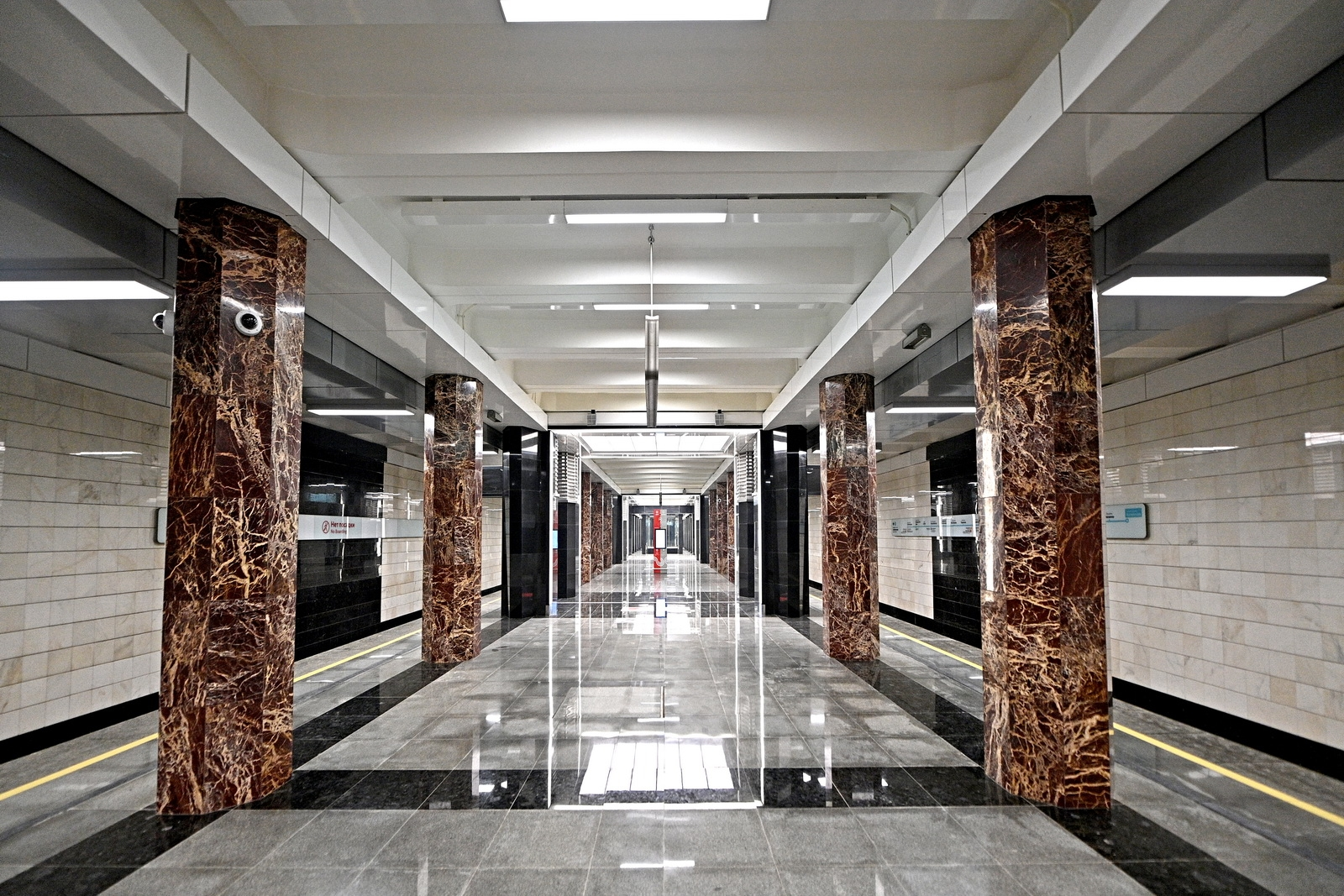
Kakhovskaya (1969) (after 2021 reconstruction)

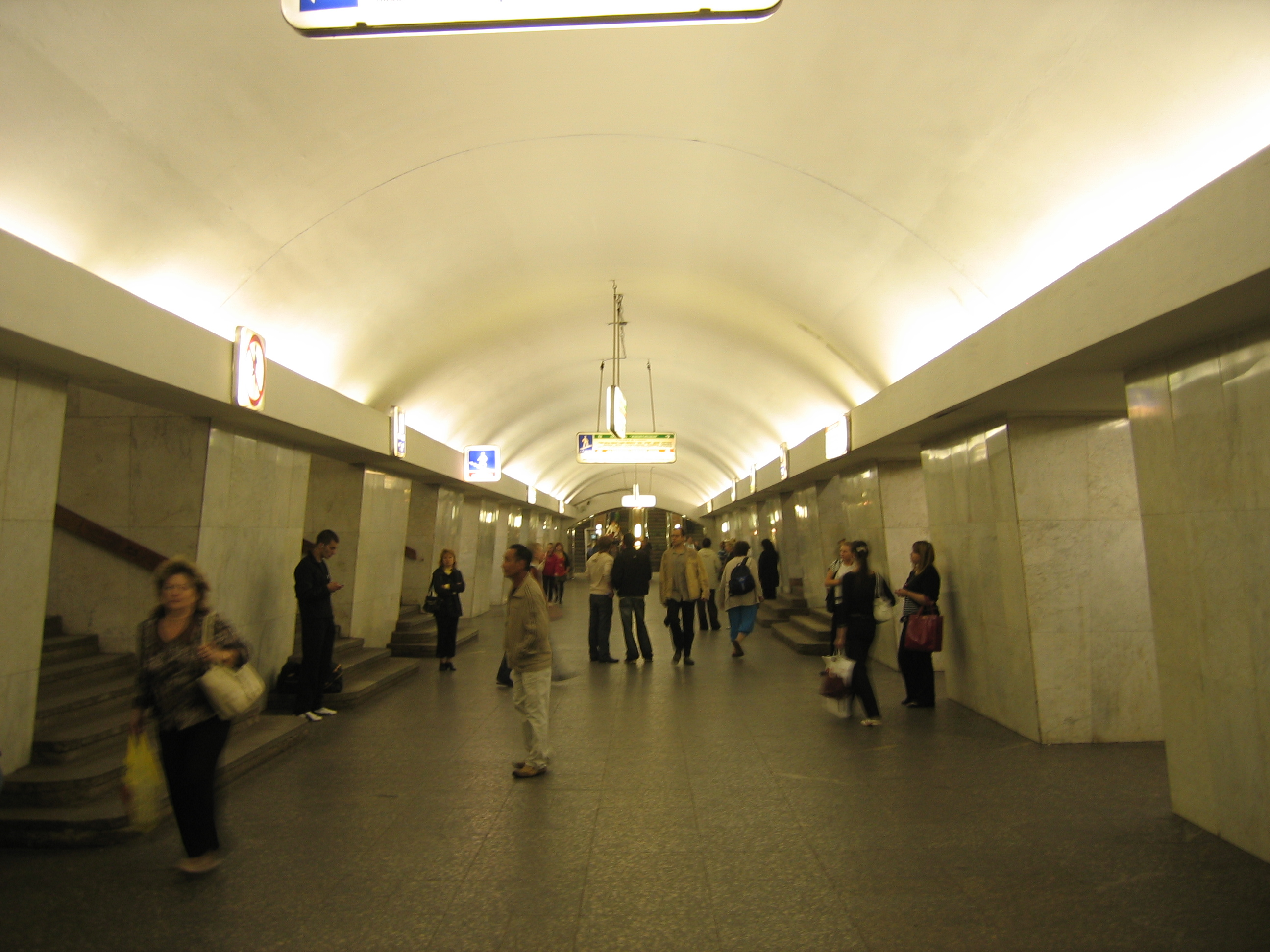
Tretyakovskaya (early station, 1971)

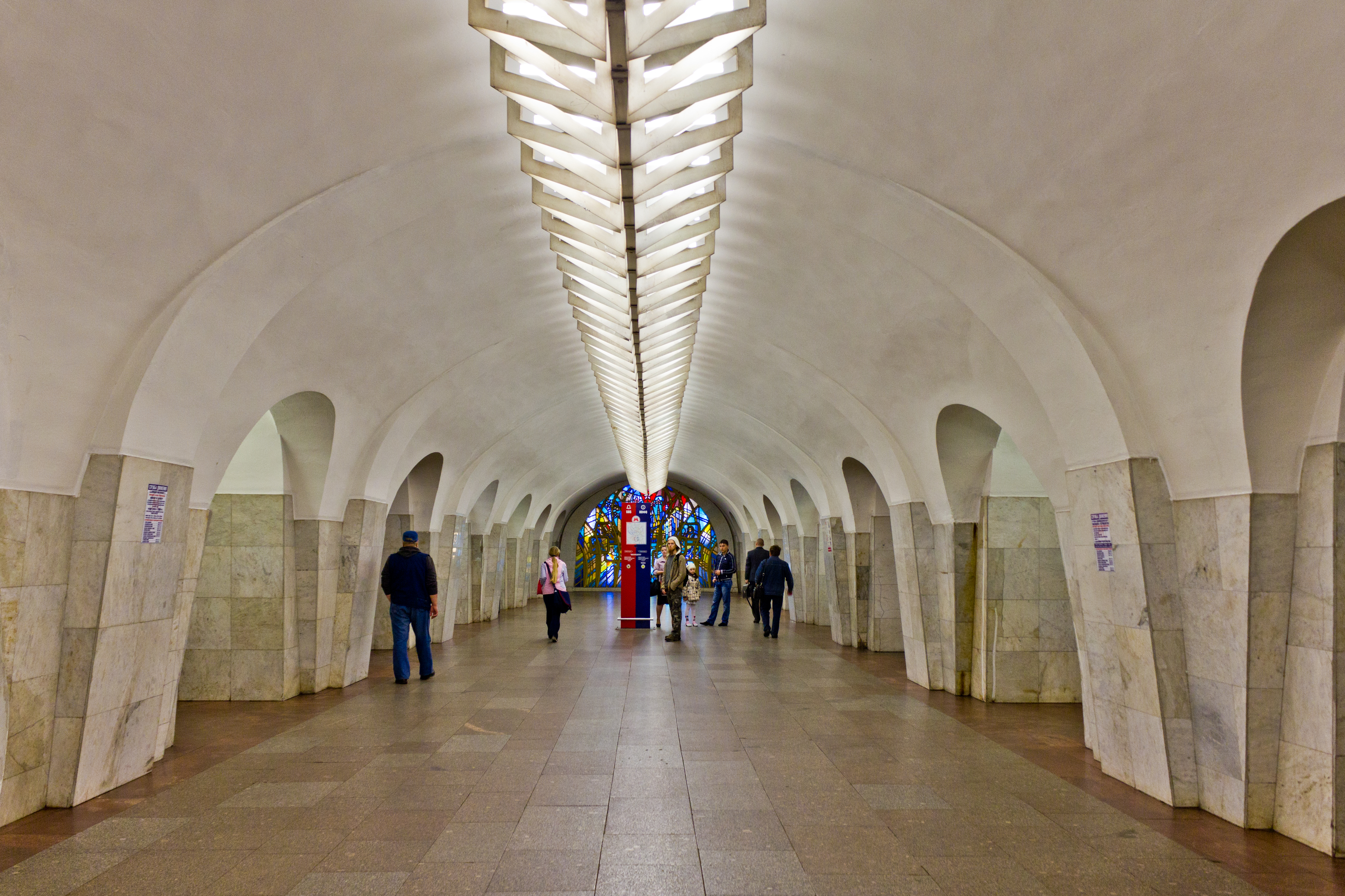
Shabolovskaya (1980)

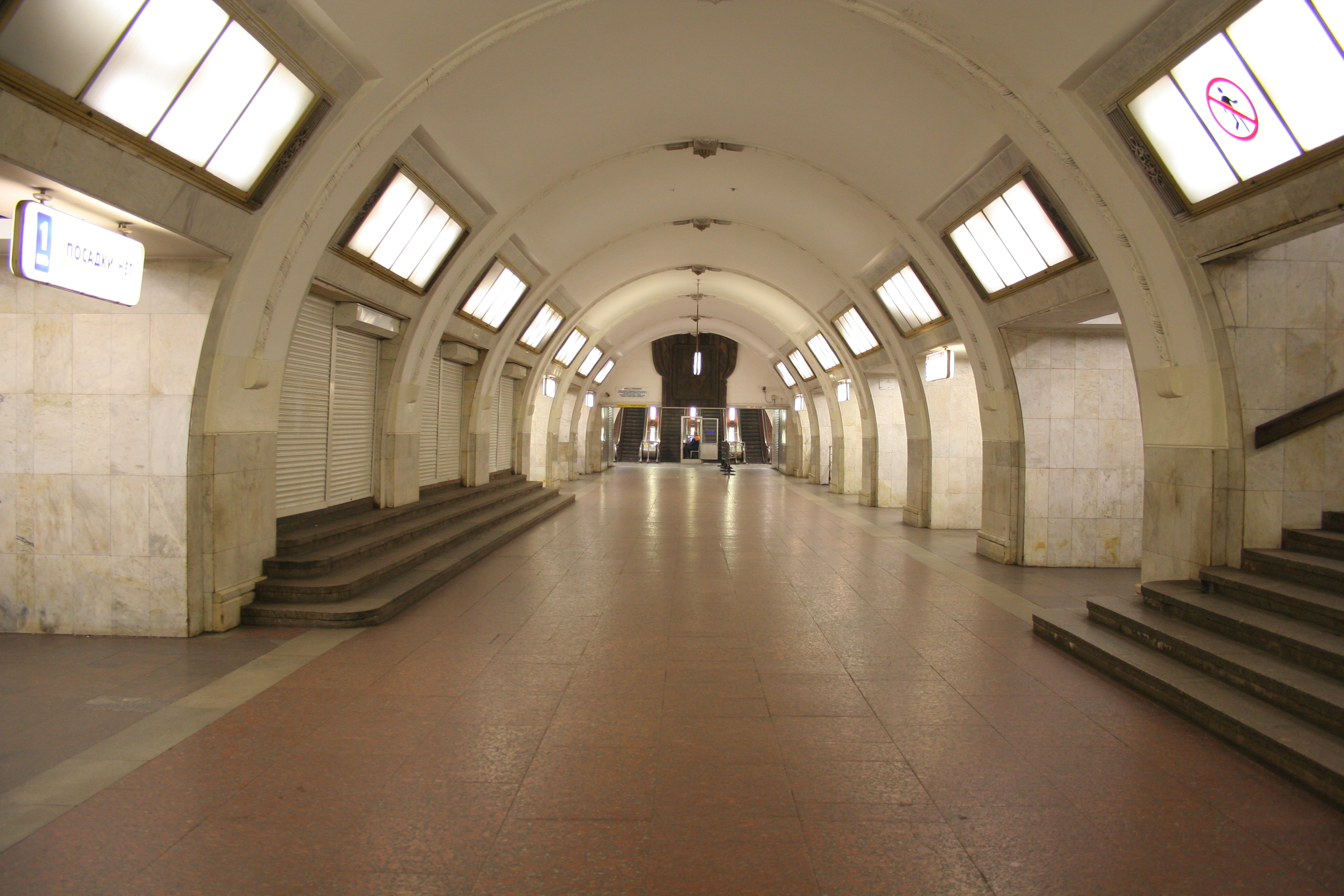
Tretyakovskaya (additional adjacent station, 1986)

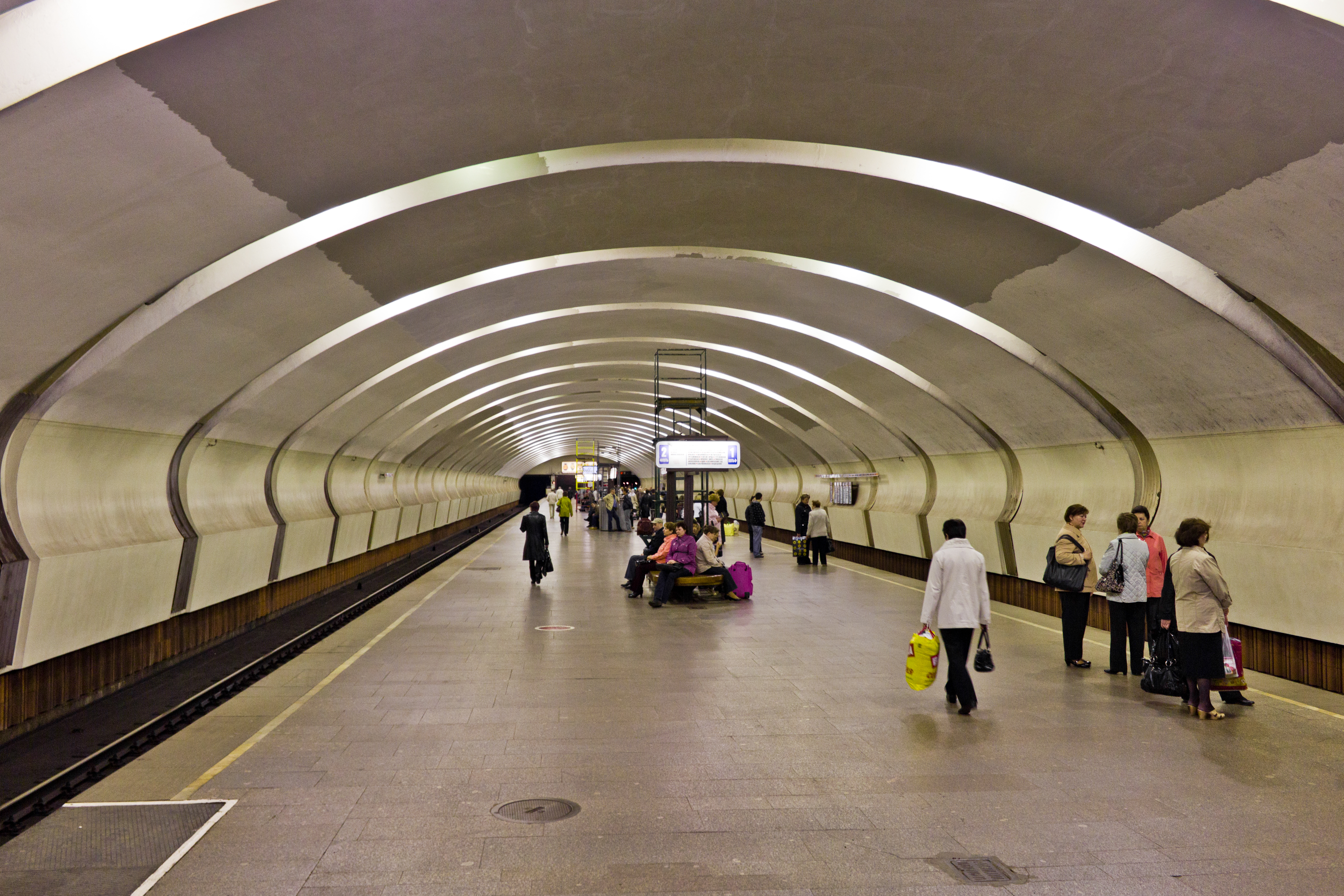
Konkovo (1987)

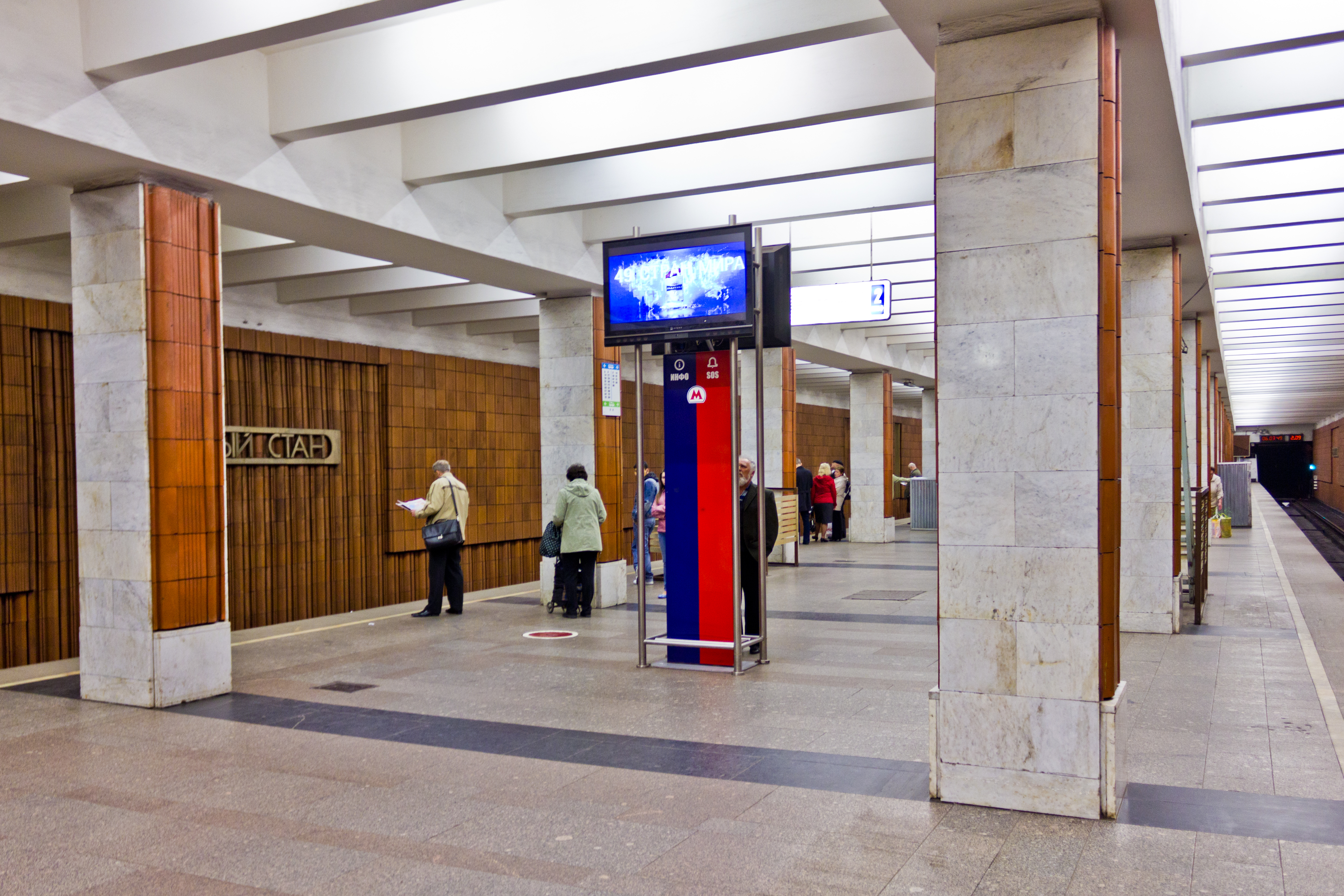
Tyoply Stan (1987)

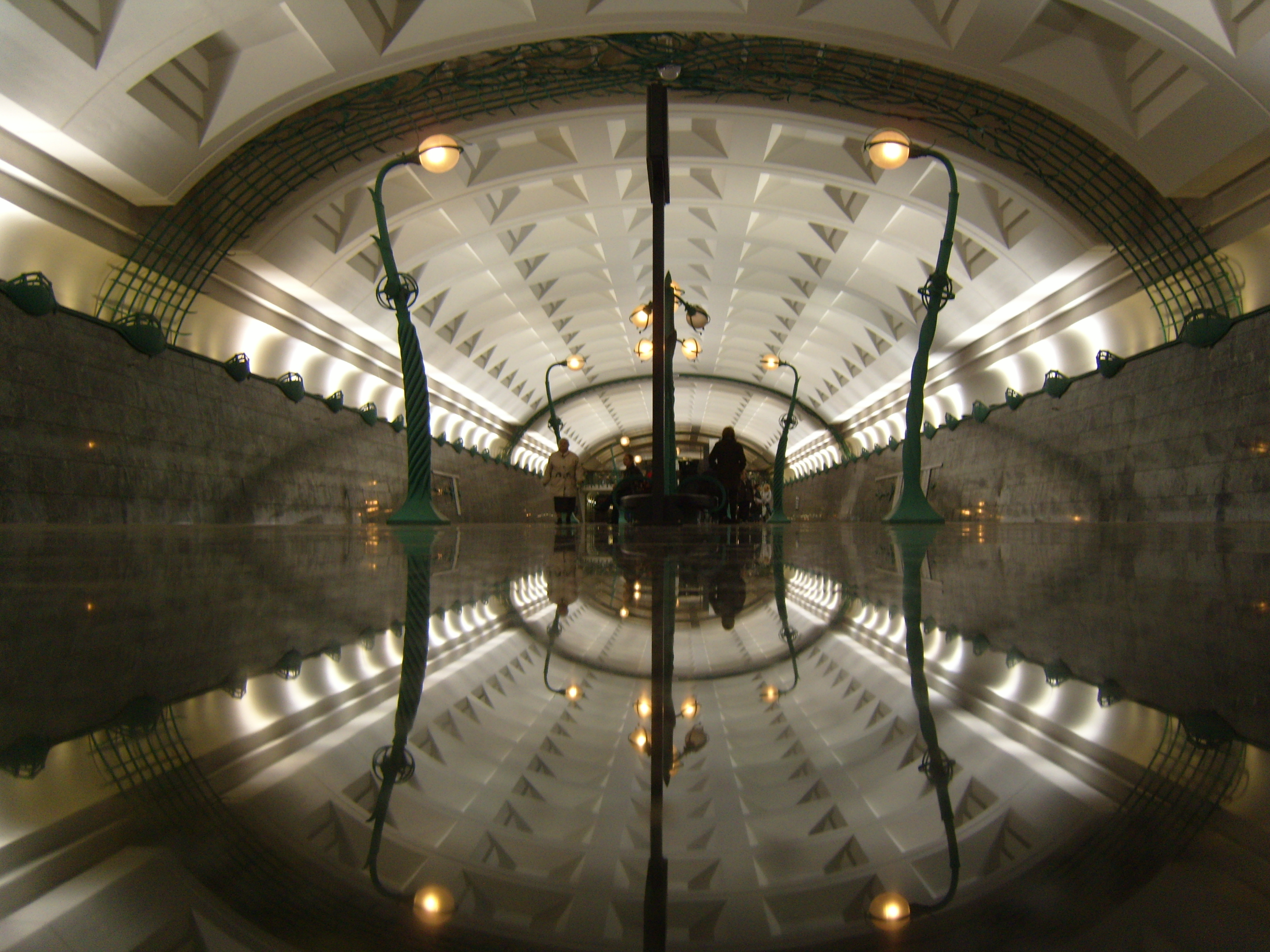
Slavyansky Bulvar (2008)

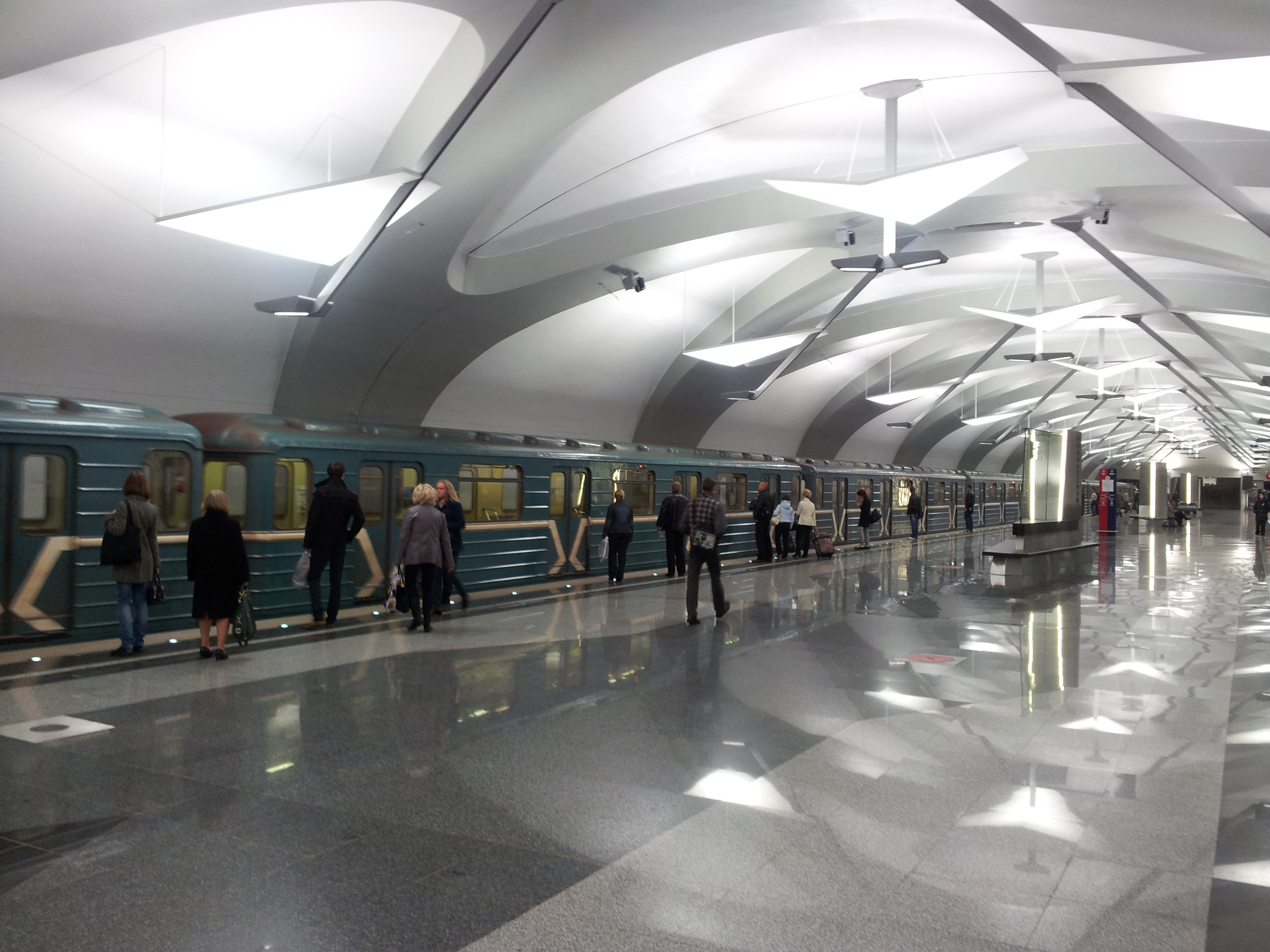
Novokosino (2012)

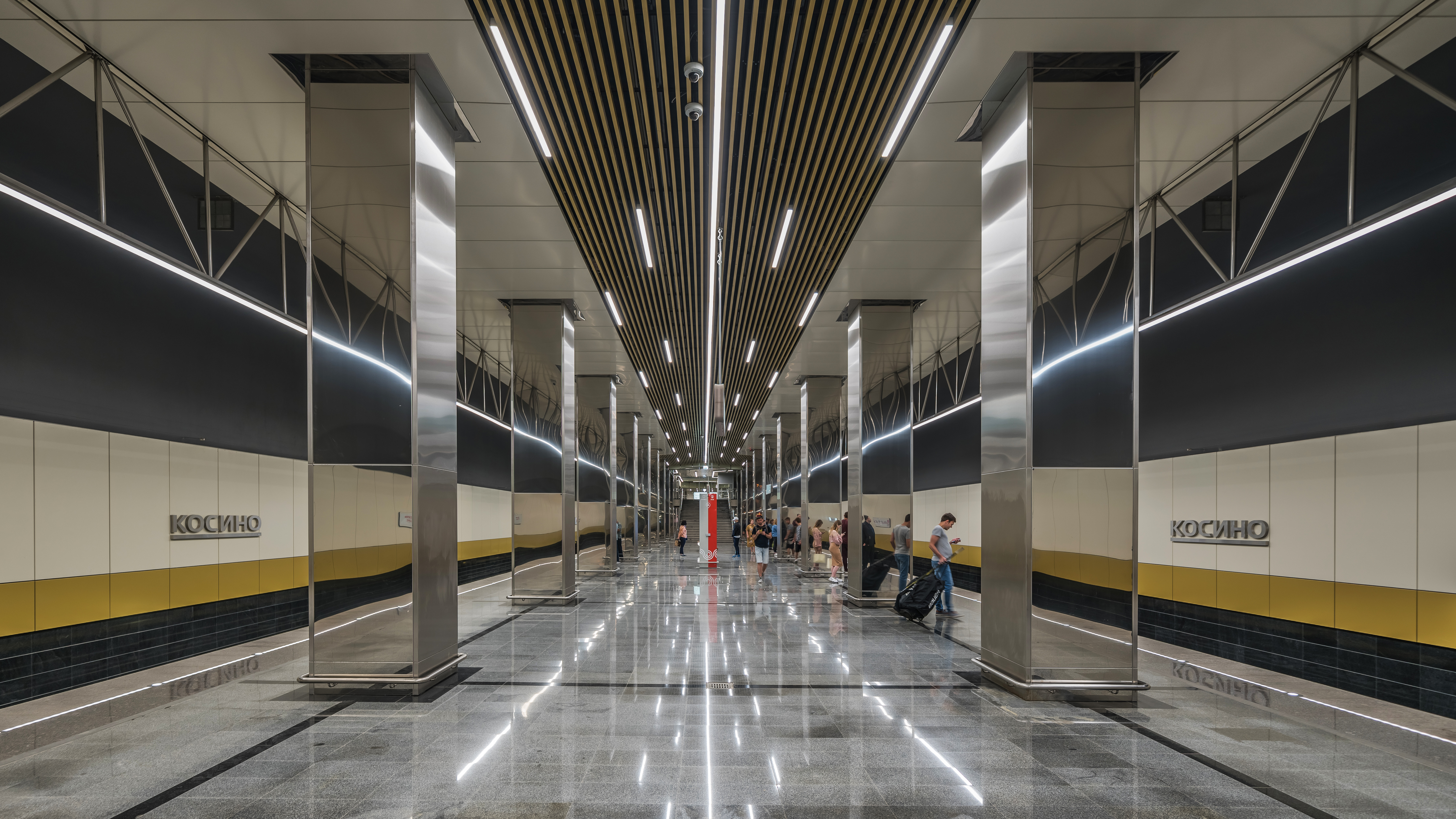
Kosino (2019)

== Rolling stock ==
A train parade on the Circle Line

Since the beginning, platforms have been at least 155 metres (509 ft) long to accommodate eight-car trains. The only exceptions are on the Filyovskaya Line: Delovoy Tsentr, Moskva-City, Studencheskaya, Kutuzovskaya, Fili, Bagrationovskaya, Filyovsky Park and Pionerskaya, which only allows six-car trains (note that this list includes all ground-level stations on the line, except Kuntsevskaya, which allows normal length trains).

Trains on the Zamoskvoretskaya, Kaluzhsko-Rizhskaya, Tagansko-Krasnopresnenskaya, Kalininskaya, Solntsevskaya, Bolshaya Koltsevaya, Serpukhovsko-Timiryazevskaya, Lyublinsko-Dmitrovskaya and Nekrasovskaya lines have eight cars, on the Sokolnicheskaya line seven or eight cars, on the original Koltsevaya line seven cars, and on the Filyovskaya line six cars. The Arbatsko-Pokrovskaya line also once ran seven-car 81-717 size trains, but now use five-car trains of another type. Butovskaya line uses three-car trains of another type.

Dimensions have varied subtly, but for the most cars fit into the ranges of 19–20 metres (62 ft 4 in – 65 ft 7 in) long and 2.65–2.7 metres (8 ft 8 3/8 in – 8 ft 10 1/4 in) wide with 4 doors per side. The 81-740/741 Rusich deviates greatly from this, with a 3-car Rusich being roughly 4 normal cars and a 5-car Rusich being 7 normal cars.

Rolling stock for Moscow Metro
Car	Delivered	In service
А/Б ("A/B")	1934–1939	1935–1975
B ("V", earlier C)	1927–1930	1946–1968
Г ("G")	1939–1940, 1946–1956	1940–1983
Д ("D")	1955–1963	1955–1995
E/Ем/Еж ("E/Em/Ezh")	1959–1979	1962–2020
81-717/81-714 "Nomernoy"	1976–2011	1977 - ff.
И ("I", 81-715/716)	1974, 1980–1981, 1985	—
81-720/721 "Yauza"	1991–2004	1998–2019
81-740/741 "Rusich"	2002–2013	2003 ff.
81-760/761 "Oka"	2010–2016	2012 ff.
81-765/766/767 "Moskva"	2016–2020	2017 ff.
81-775/776/777 "Moskva 2020"	2020 ff.	2020 ff.
81-775.2/776.2/777.2 "Moskva 2024"	2024 ff.	2024 ff.

=== Trains no longer in operation ===
The V-type trains were formerly from Berlin U-Bahn C-class trains from 1945 to 1969, until its complete demise in 1970. They were transported from the Berlin U-Bahn during the Soviet occupation. A-type and B-type trains were custom-made since the opening.

The Moscow Monorail used Intamin P30 trains, which consisted of six short cars.

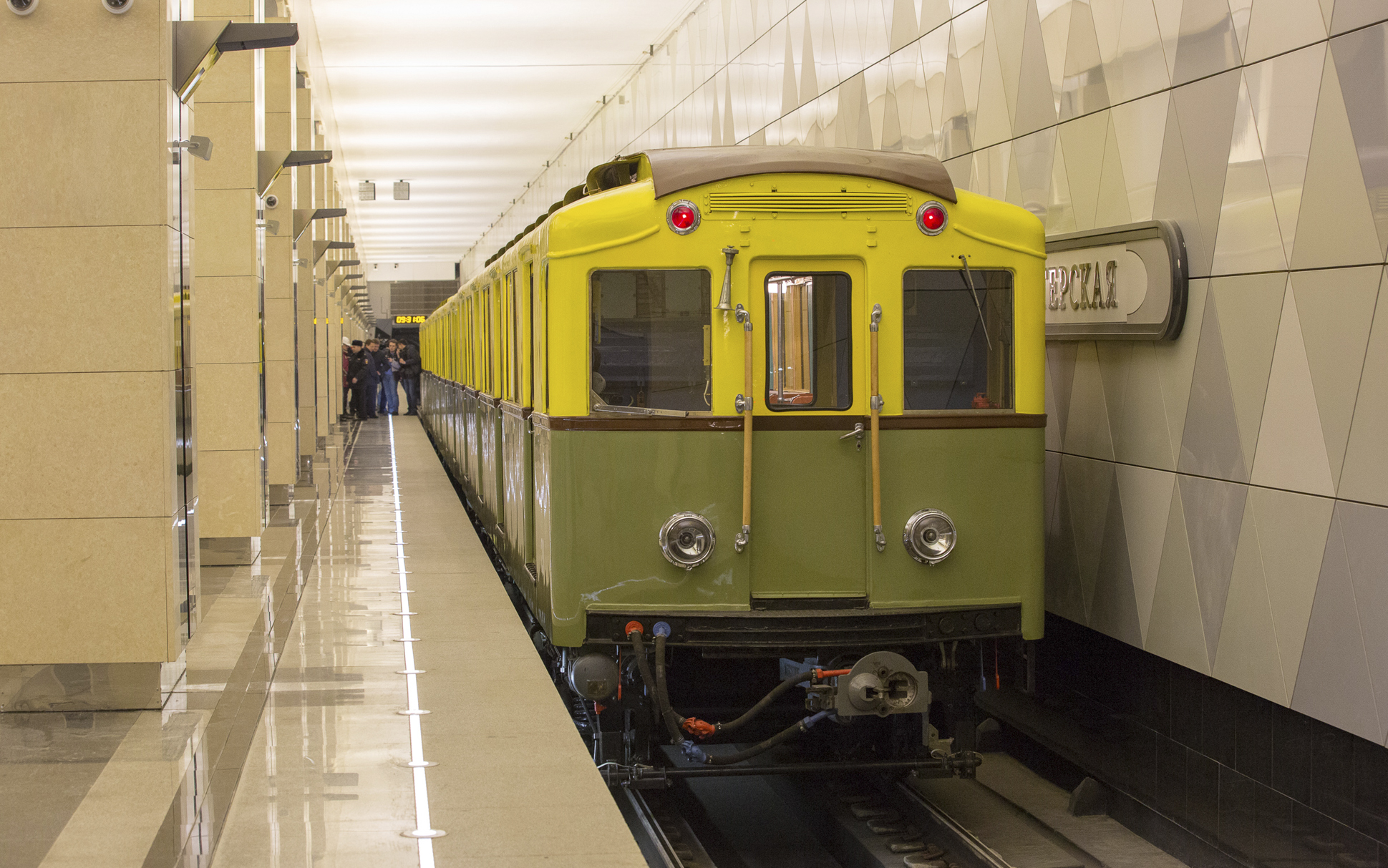
A-type

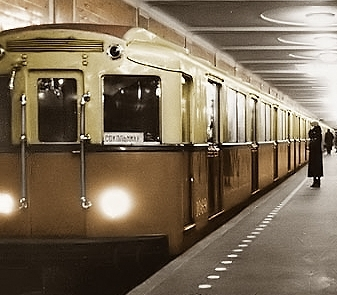
B-type

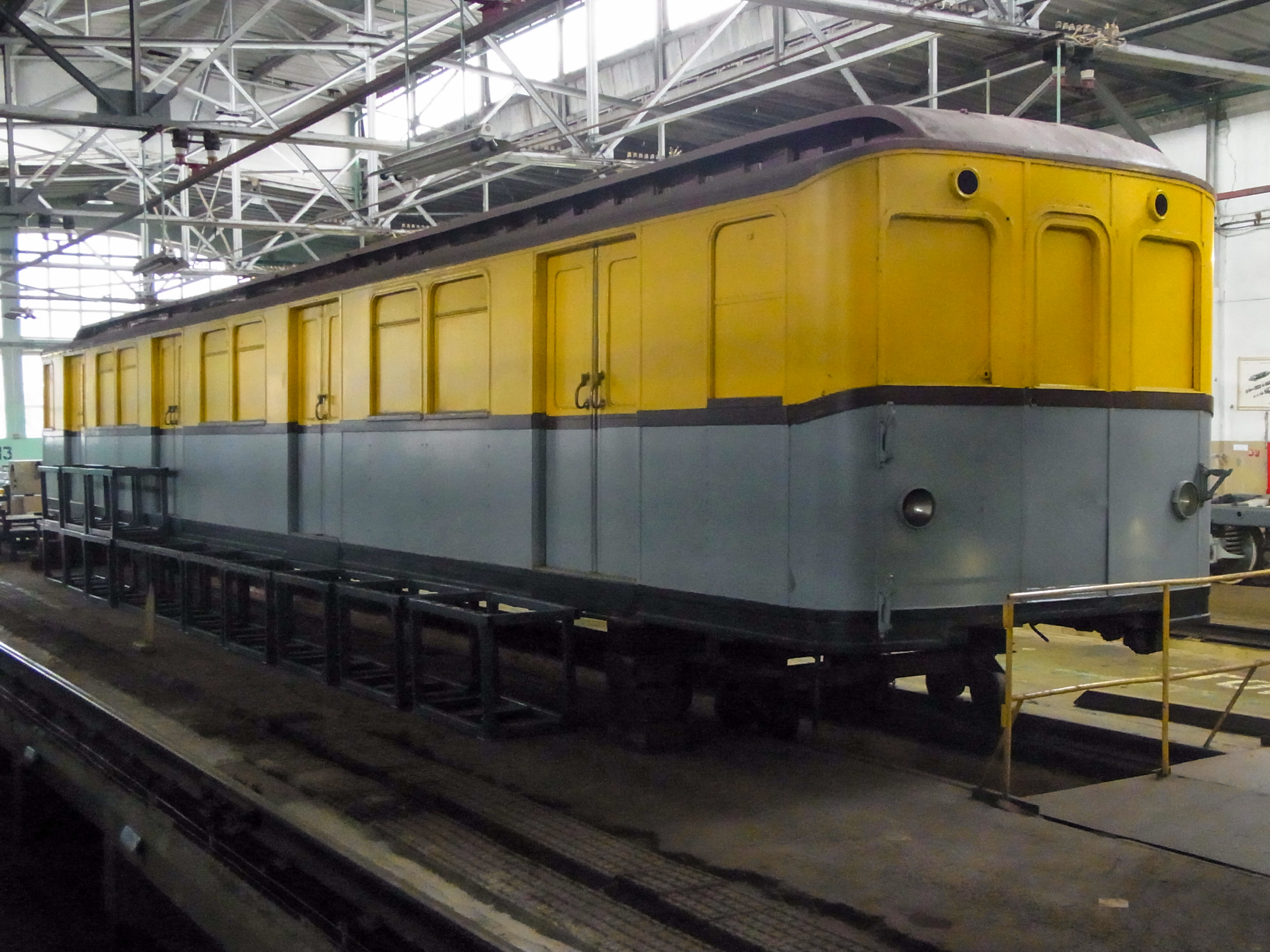
V-4-type (former Berlin Class C-1)

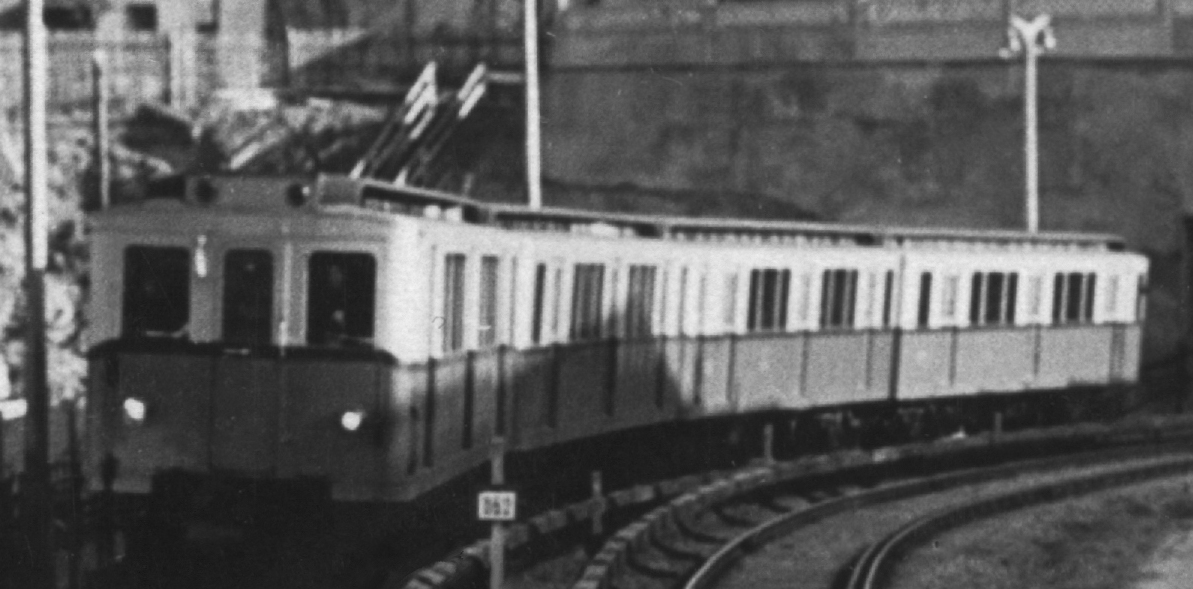
V2-type (former Berlin Class C-2)

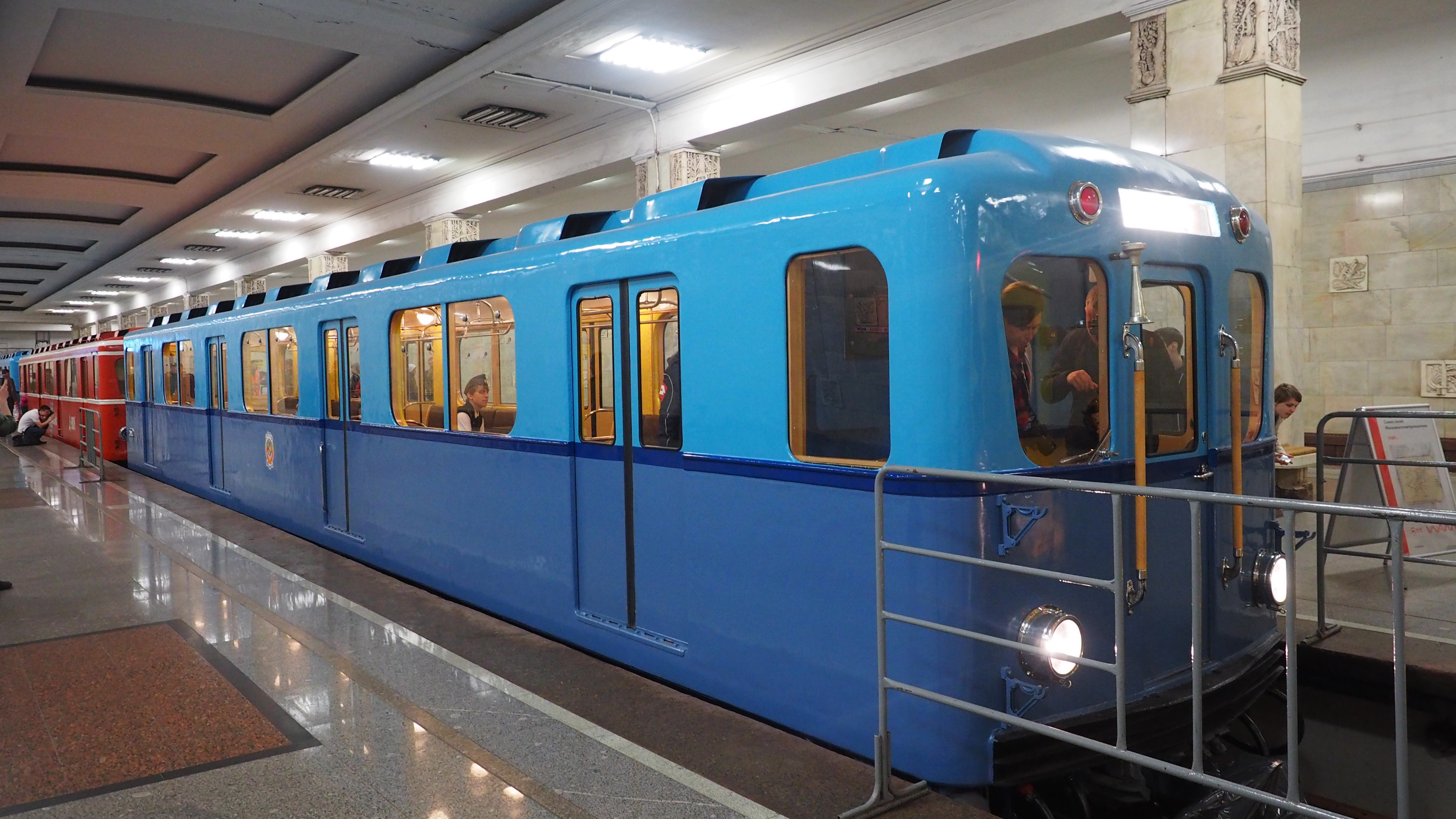
G-type

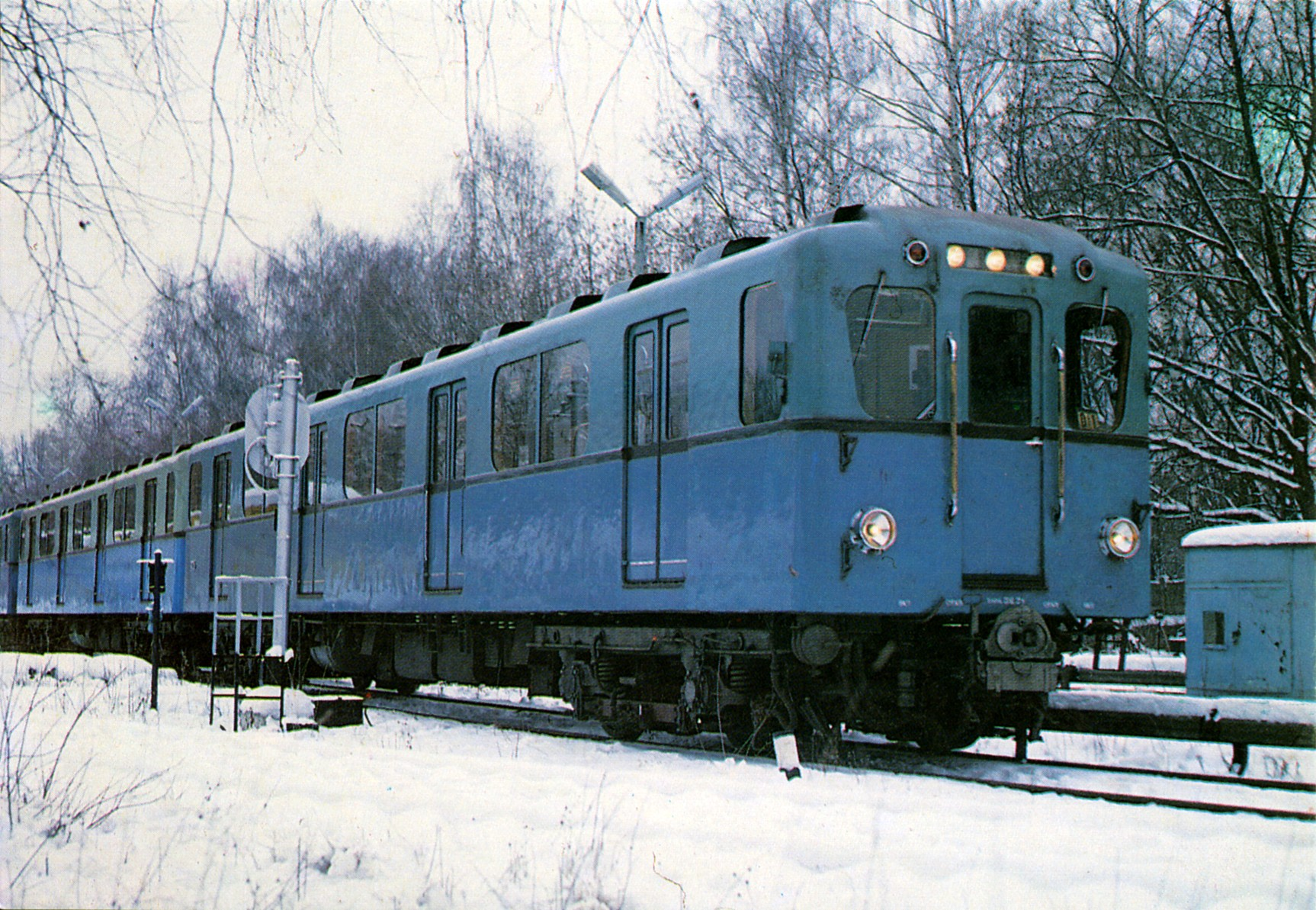
D-type

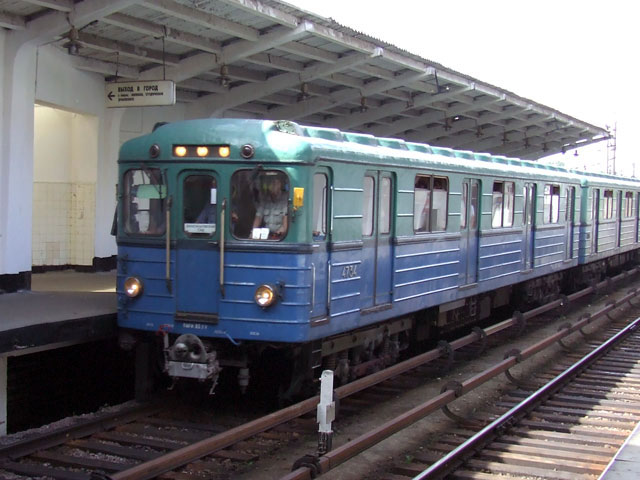
E-type

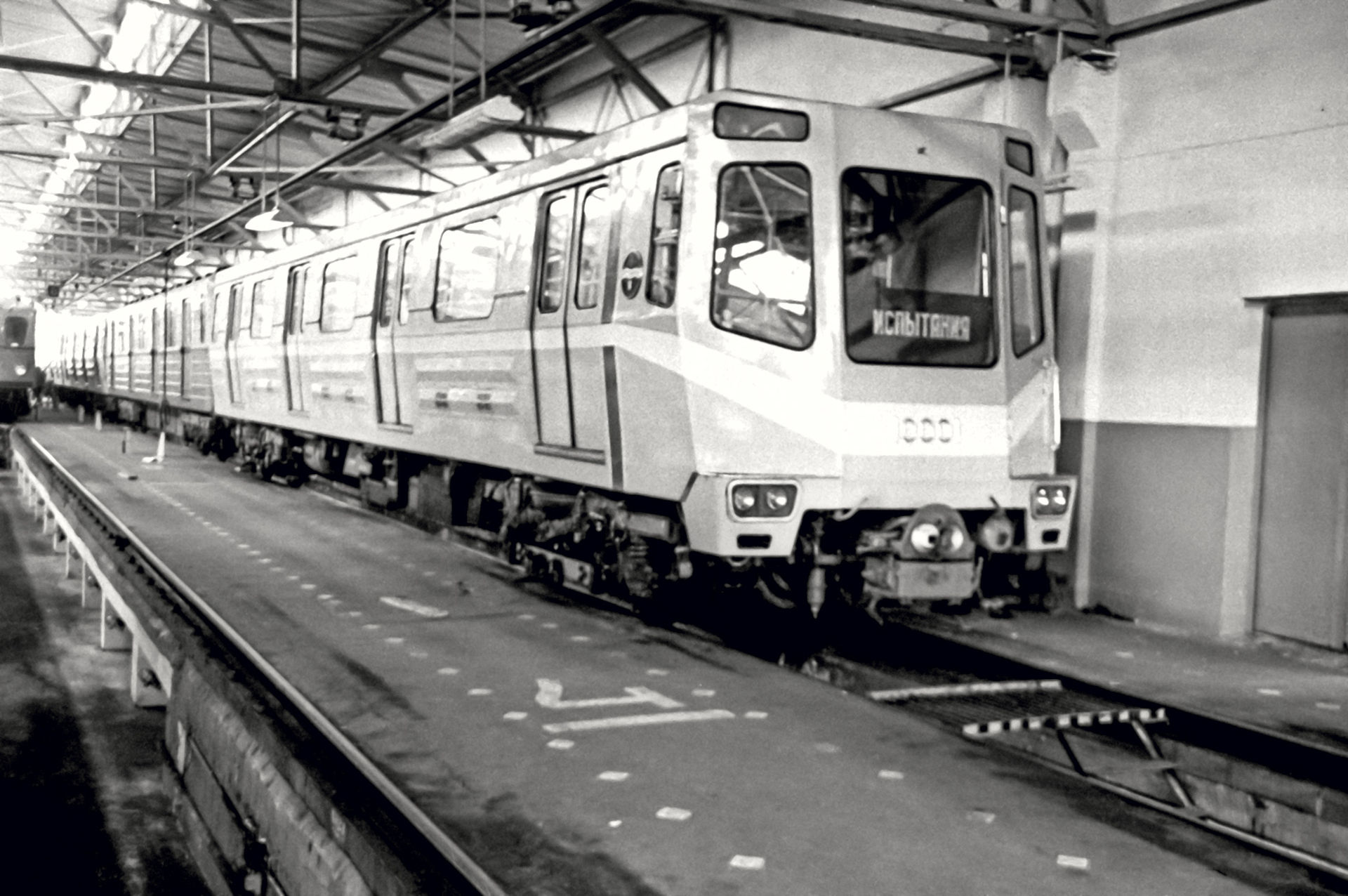
I-1-type (81-715.1/716.1)

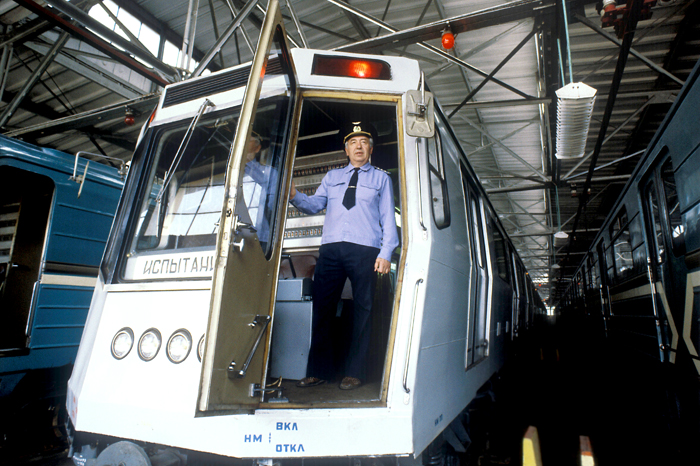
I-2-type (81-715.2/716.2)

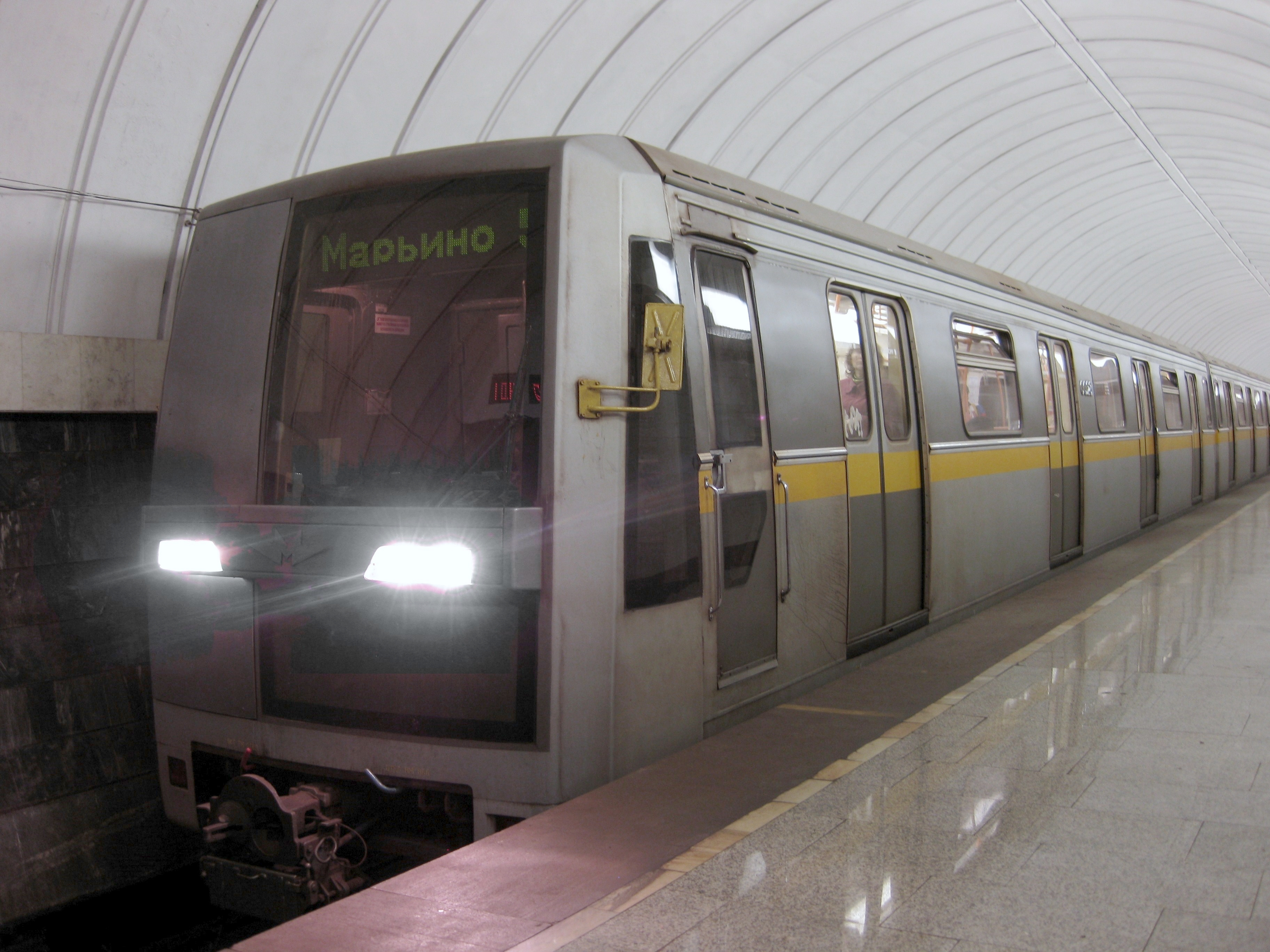
81-720/721-type ("Yauza")

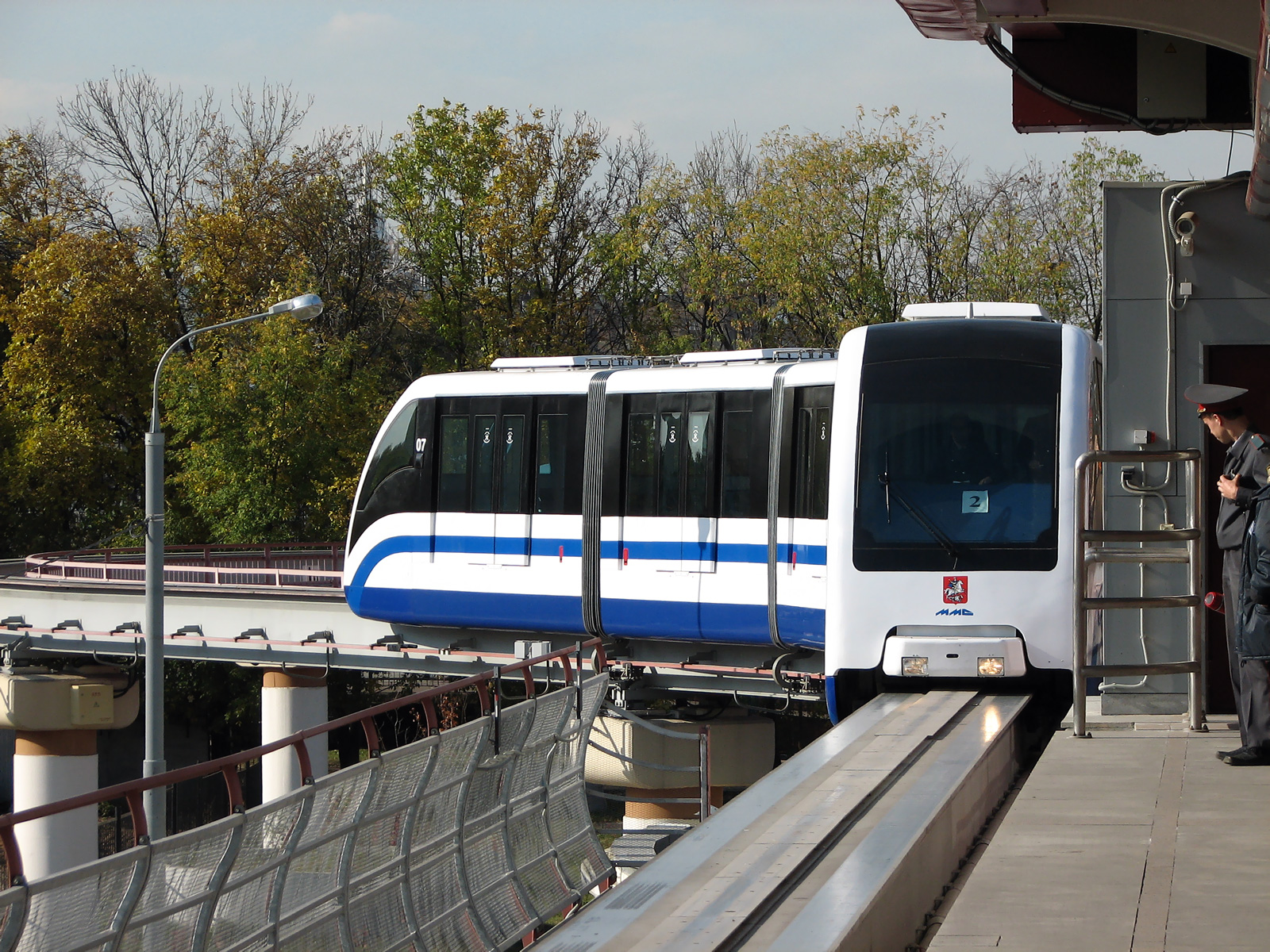
Intamin P30 train (operates on the Monorail line)

=== Trains in operation ===
Currently, the Metro only operates 81-style trains.

Rolling stock on several lines was replaced with articulated 81-740/741 Rusich trains, which were originally designed for light rail subway lines. The Butovskaya Line was designed by different standards, and has shorter (96-metre (315 ft) long) platforms. It employs articulated 81-740/741 trains, which consist of three cars (although the line can also use traditional four-car trains).

On the Moscow Central Circle, which is a route on the conventional railway line, ES2G Lastochka trains are used, consisting of five cars.

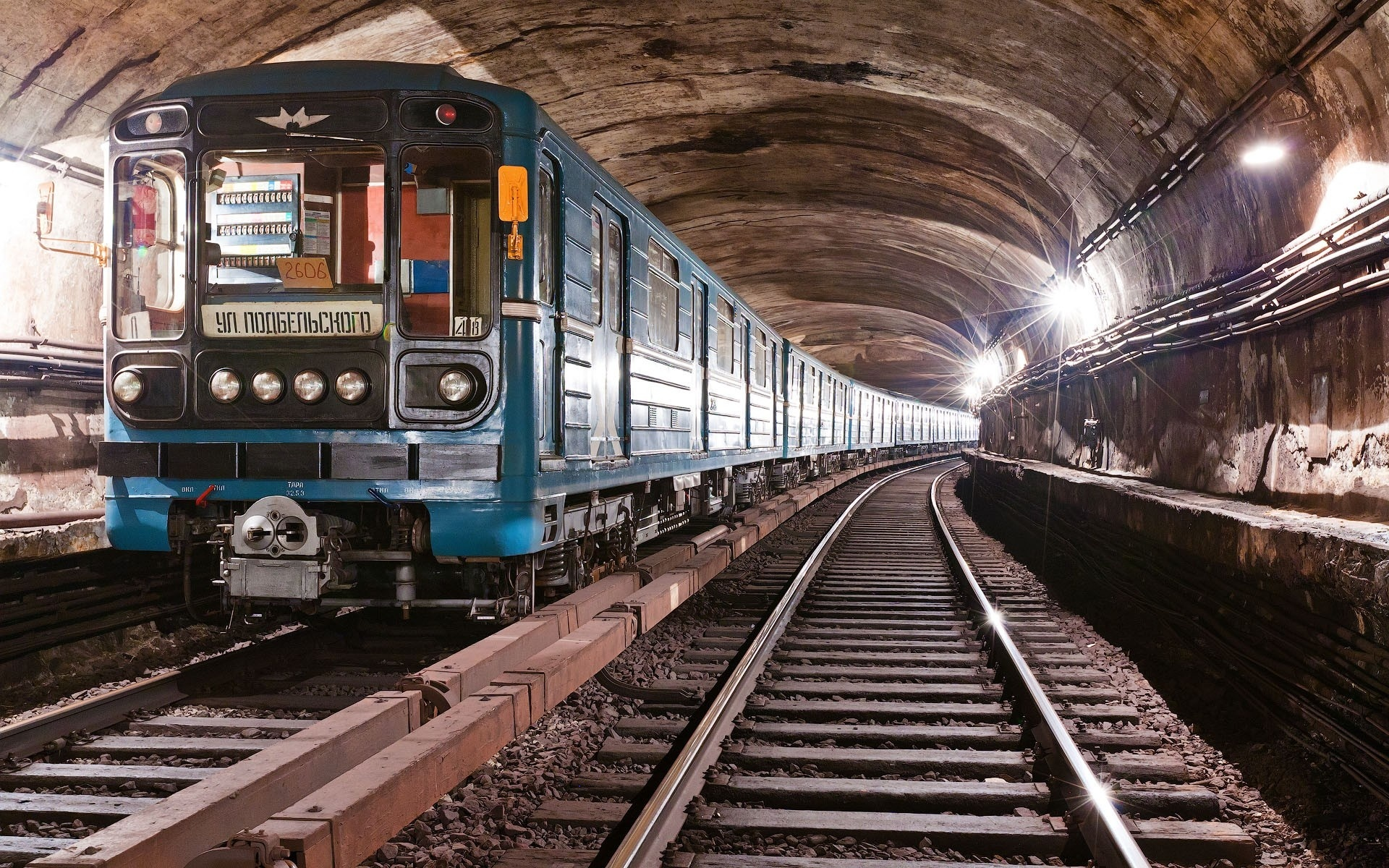
81-717/81-714-type

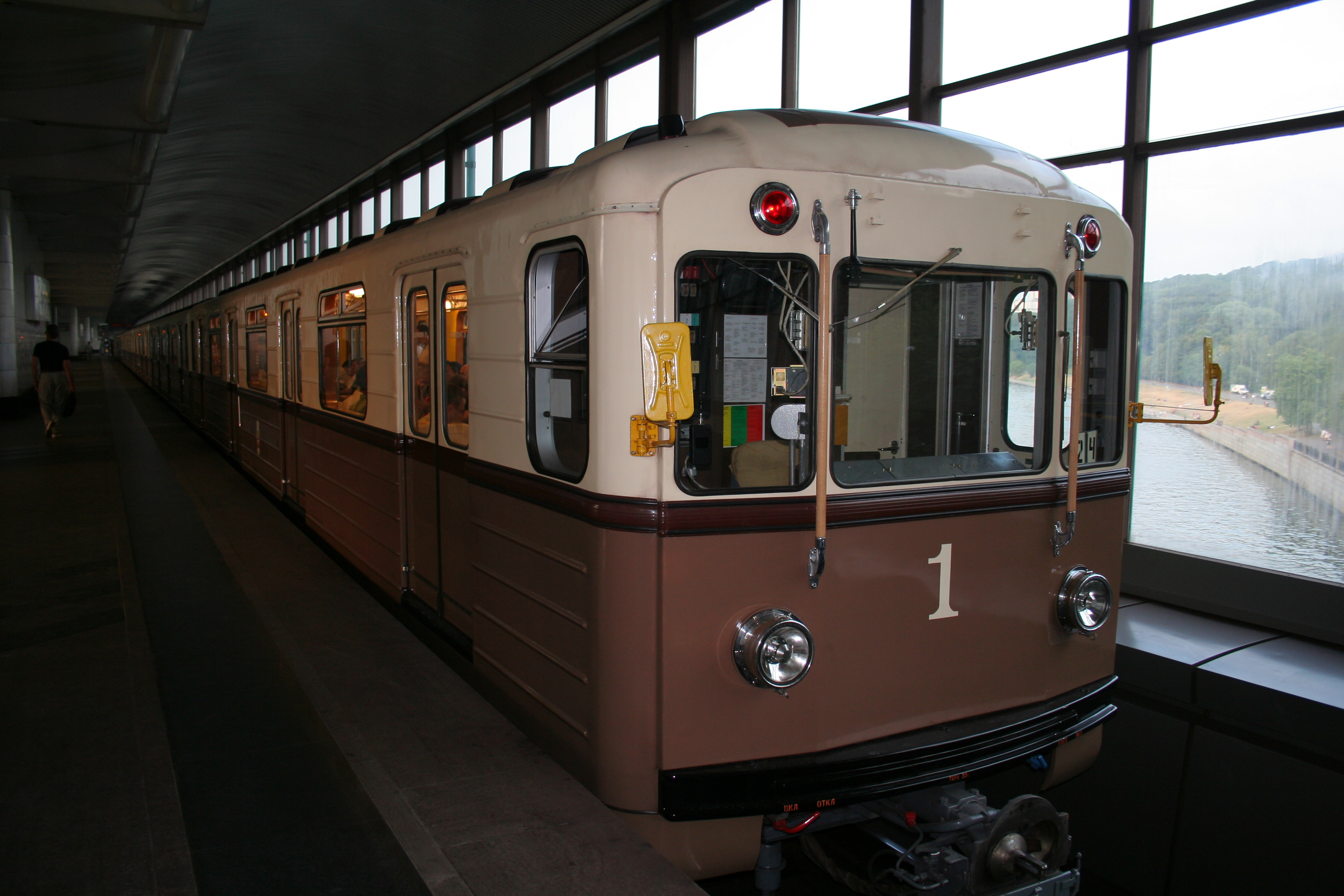
81-717.5A/81-714.5A-type ("retro train")

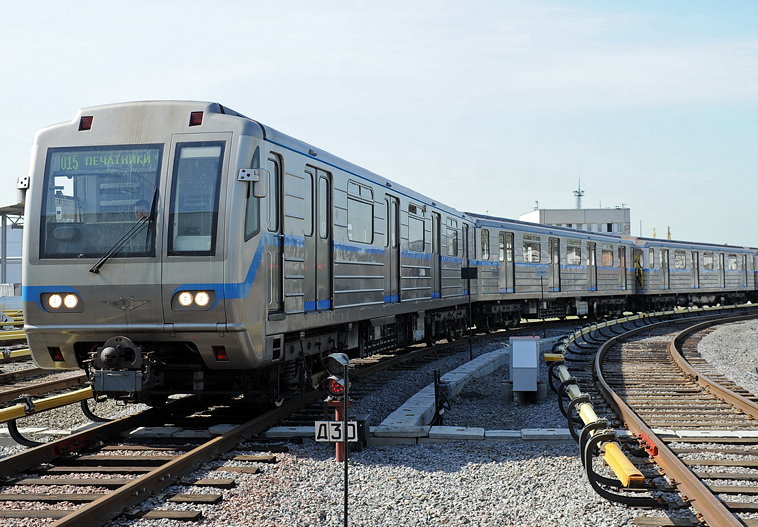
81-717.6-714.6-type

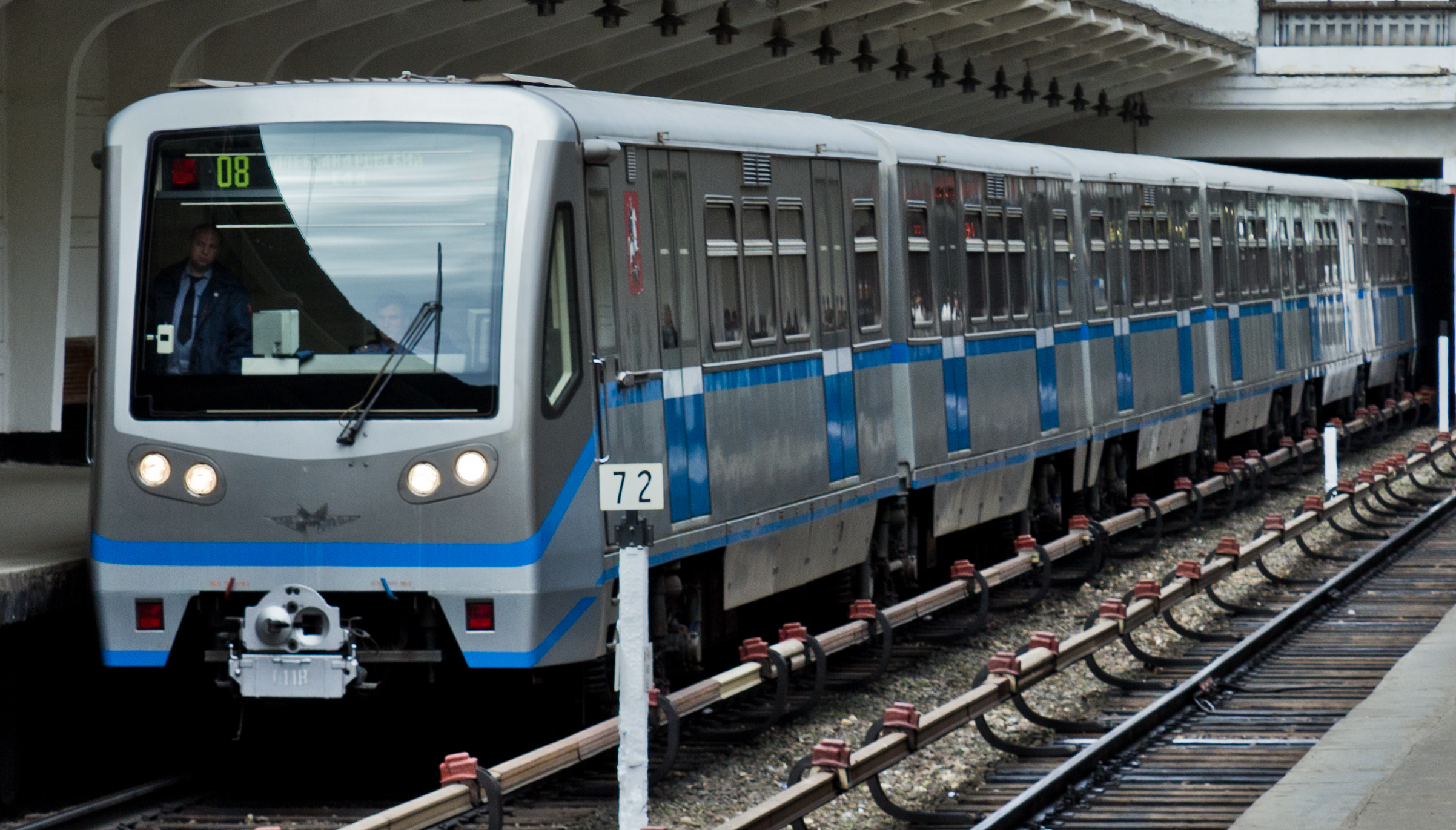
81-740/741-type ("Rusich")

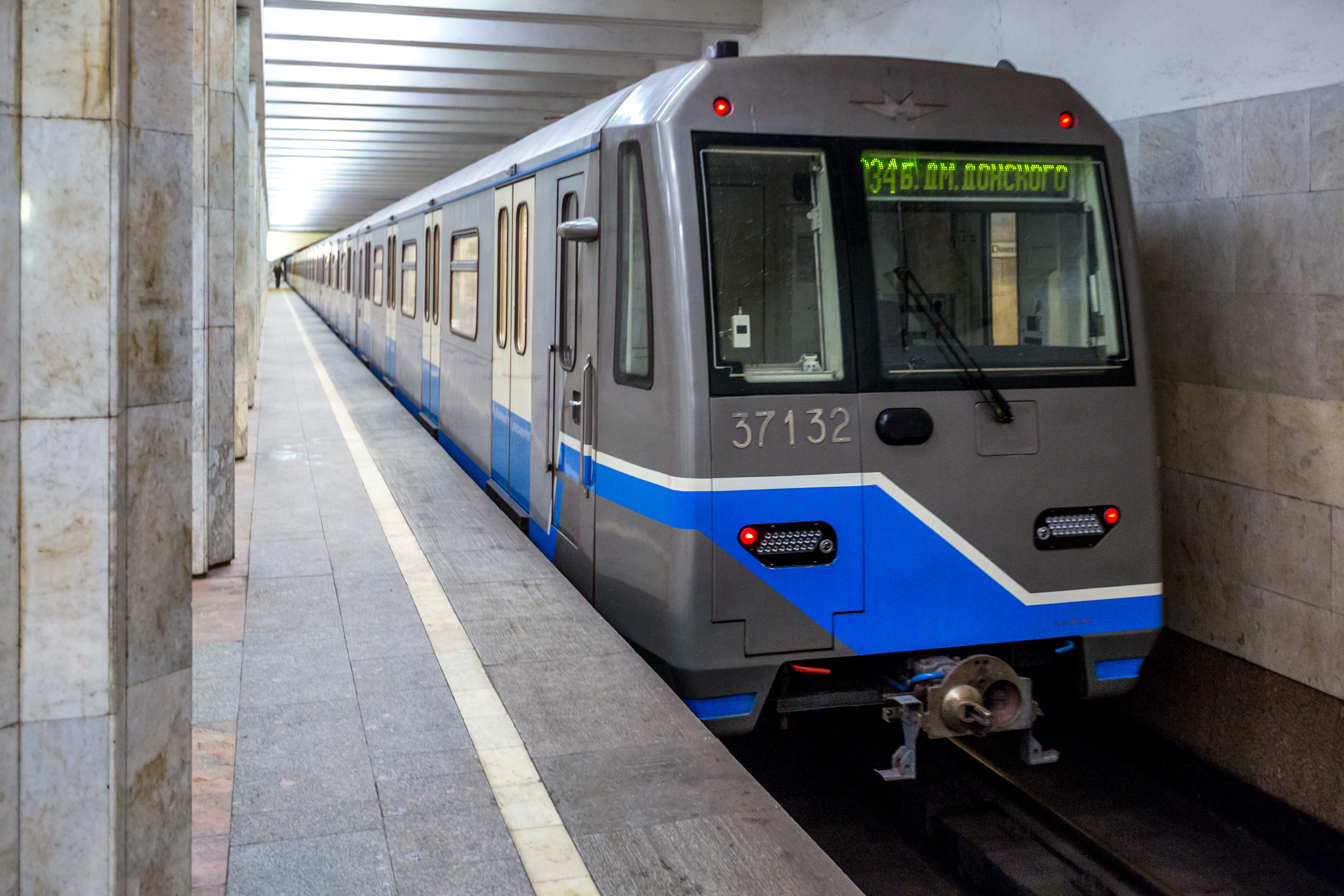
81-760/761-type ("Oka") (ru)

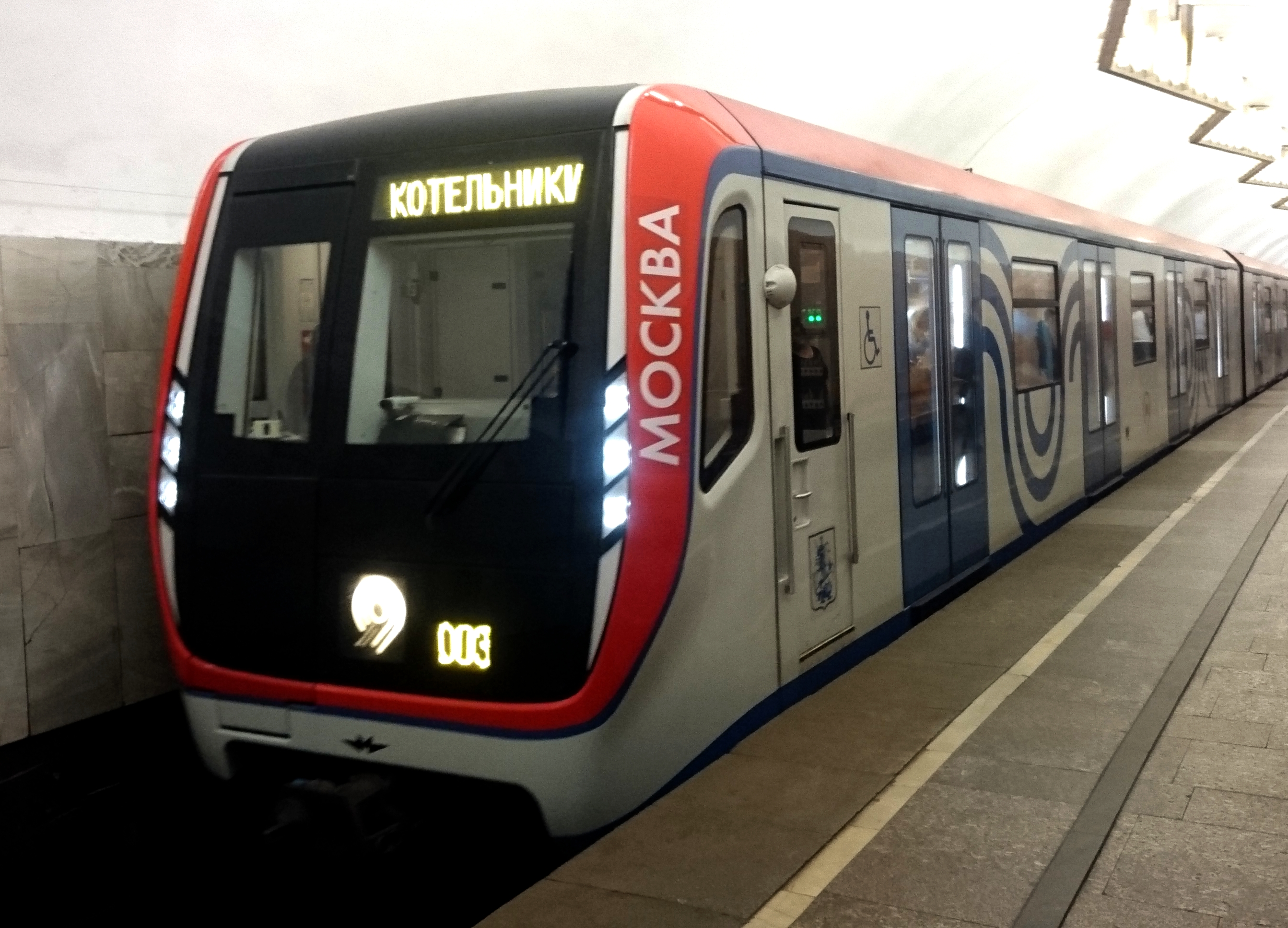
81-765/766/767-type ("Moscow")

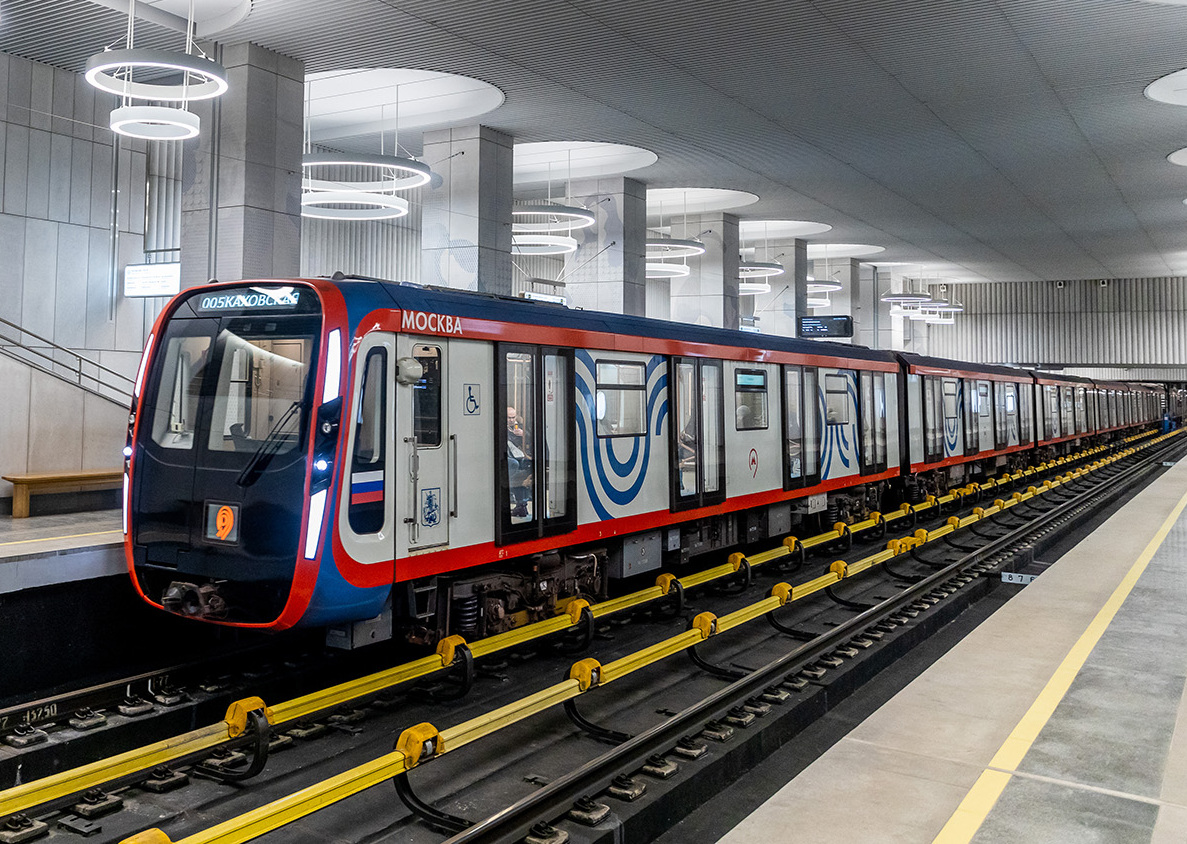
81-775/776/777-type ("Moscow-2020")

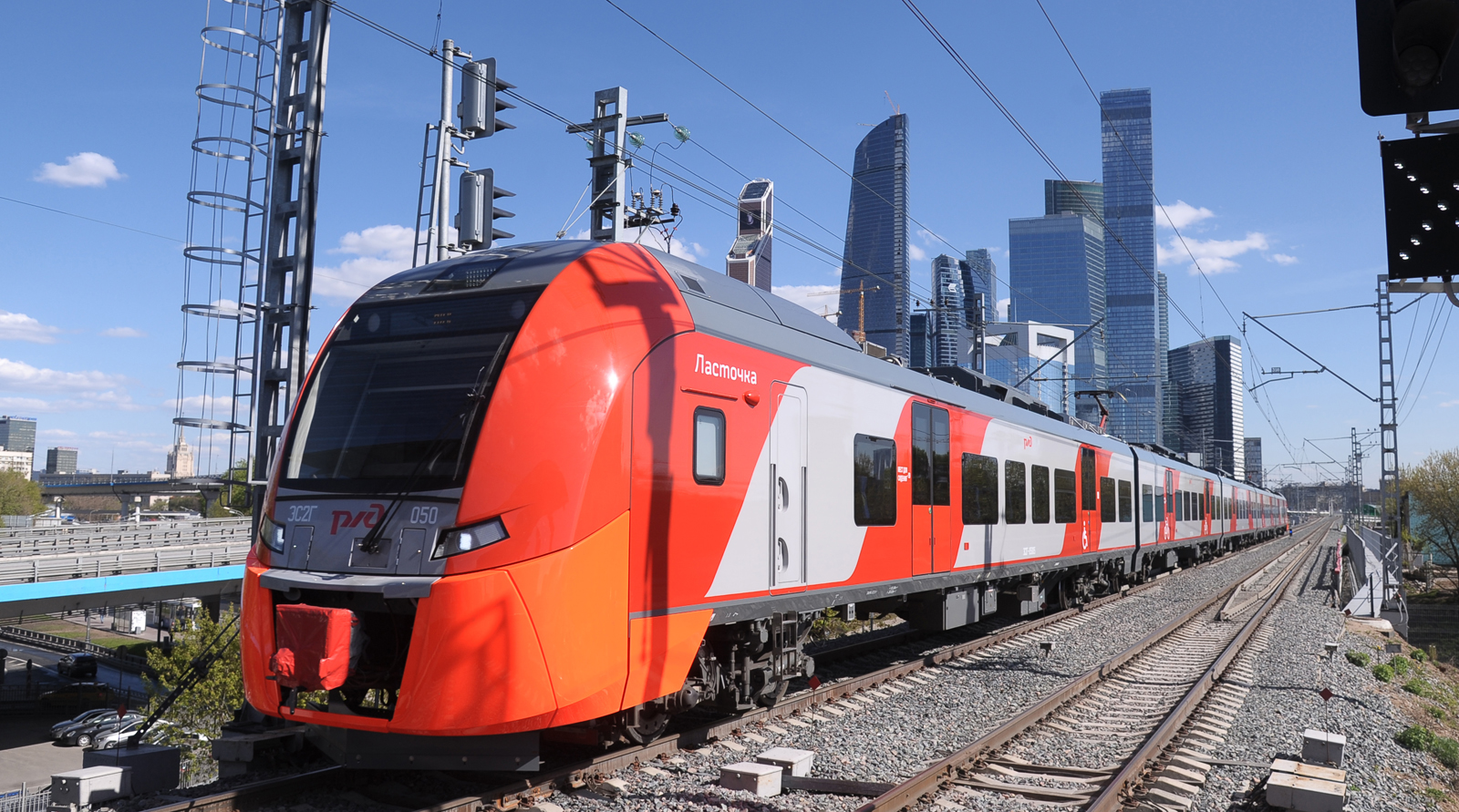
ES2G Lastochka train (operates on the Moscow Central Circle line)

== Ticketing ==
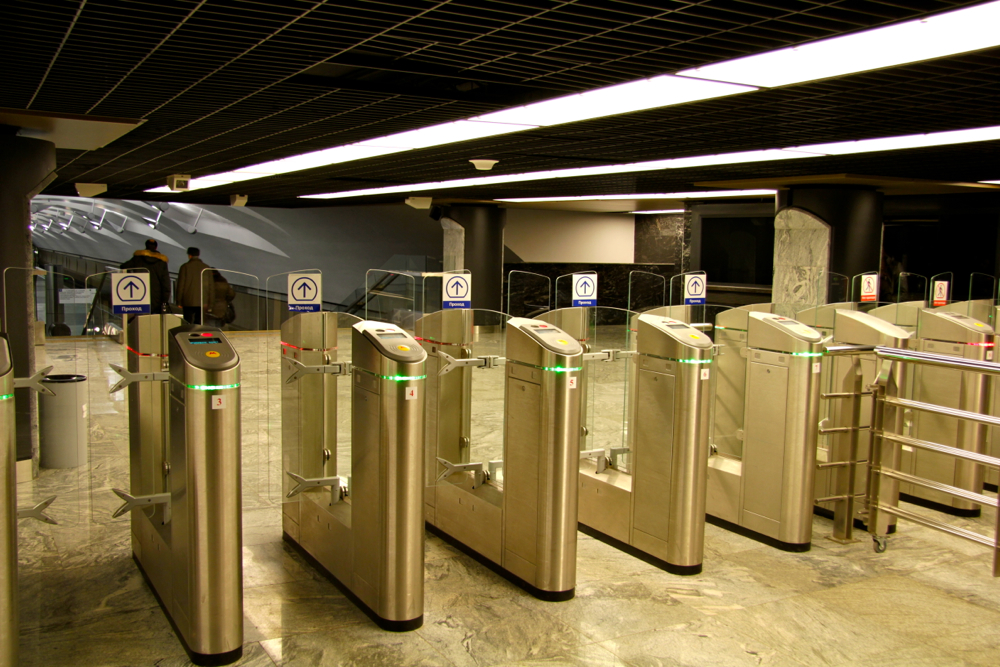
Moscow Metro turnstiles

The Moscow Metro charges a flat fare for a single journey, regardless of distance or time travelled within the network. An exception to this is the Moscow Central Diameters, which operate on a zone-based fare system. The Moscow Metro ticketing system allows free interchanges within a 90-minute window between different transport modes, including the MCC, the MCD, trams and buses.

Modern Metro turnstiles are designed to accept various forms of payment, including plastic cards like the Troika card or Moscow Resident Social Cards, bank cards, bank stickers, souvenir tickets such as Troika rings, bracelets, or keychains, and disposable RFID chip cardboard cards. Additionally, all stations are equipped to accept biometric payments. Some transport cards have usage limitations that impose a waiting period between consecutive uses (e.g., delays of 7 or 20 minutes).

=== History of the ticketing system ===
Soviet era turnstiles simply accepted N kopeck coins.

In the early years of Russian Federation (and with the start of a hyperinflation) plastic tokens were used. Disposable magnetic stripe cards were introduced in 1993 on a trial basis, and used as unlimited monthly tickets between 1996 and 1998. The sale of tokens ended on 1 January 1999, and they stopped being accepted in February 1999; from that time, magnetic cards were used as tickets with a fixed number of rides.

On 1 September 1998, the Moscow Metro became the first metro system in Europe to fully implement "contactless" smart cards, known as Transport Cards. Transport Cards were the card to have unlimited amount of trips for 30, 90 or 365 days, its active lifetime was projected as 3½ years. Defective cards were to be exchanged at no extra cost.

In August 2004, the city government launched the Moscow Resident Social Card programme. Social Cards are free smart cards issued for the elderly and other groups of citizens officially registered as residents of Moscow or the Moscow region; they offer discounts in shops and pharmacies, and double as credit cards issued by the Bank of Moscow. Social Cards can be used for unlimited free access to the city's public-transport system, including the Moscow Metro; while they do not feature the time delay, they include a photograph and are non-transferable.

Since 2006, several banks have issued credit cards which double as Ultralight cards and are accepted at turnstiles. The fare is passed to the bank and the payment is withdrawn from the owner's bank account at the end of the calendar month, using a discount rate based on the number of trips that month (for up to 70 trips, the cost of each trip is prorated from current Ultralight rates; each additional trip costs 24.14 rubles). Partner banks include the Bank of Moscow, CitiBank, Rosbank, Alfa-Bank and Avangard Bank.

In January 2007, Moscow Metro began replacing limited magnetic cards with contactless disposable tickets based on NXP's MIFARE Ultralight technology. Ultralight tickets are available for a fixed number of trips in 1, 2, 5, 10, 20 and 60-trip denominations (valid for 5 or 90 days from the day of purchase) and as a monthly ticket, only valid for a selected calendar month and limited to 70 trips. The sale of magnetic cards ended on 16 January 2008 and magnetic cards ceased to be accepted in late 2008, making the Moscow metro the world's first major public-transport system to run exclusively on a contactless automatic fare-collection system.

=== Contemporary ticketing system ===
On 2 April 2013, the Moscow Department of Transport introduced the Troika smartcard, which serves as the foundation of the city's modern ticketing system. Currently, passengers can use a single Troika card to pay for travel on the metro, MCC, MCD, buses, trams, river transport, suburban trains, and Aeroexpress. Approximately 80% of all trips in Moscow are paid for using Troika, with over 50 million cards sold to date.

In 2023, Troika production, including its chip, was fully localized in Moscow. In 2024, Moscow plans to launch a virtual analog of the card for smartphones.

Moreover, the Moscow Metro offers Ediniy (Unified) tickets with varying durations: 1 day, 3 days, 30 days, 60 days, 90 days and 365 days.

In 2015, the Moscow Metro started testing bank card payments at ticket windows. At the moment, bank card or bank sticker payments are accepted at all turnstiles in the network. As of April 2024, this payment option is used approximately 900 thousand times daily.

In October 2021, the Moscow Metro became the first metro system in the world to implement biometric payment on a large scale. To use this system, passengers must link their photo, bank card, and metro card to the service through the Moscow Metro mobile app. This allows passengers to pay for their rides without taking out their phone, metro card, or bank card, thereby increasing passenger flow at station entrances. The technology is available at all metro stations, the MCC, and on river transport. As of April 2024, passengers have completed 100 million trips using biometric technology.

Other payment methods include:

- Payment via Mir Pay using an Android phone with a Mir card
- Payment with a smartphone via FPS in open test mode at all metro, MCC, and river transport turnstiles
- Cash or bank card payments at ticket offices and vending machines
- Moscow Resident Social Card

The Moscow Metro ticketing system received two prestigious international Transport Ticketing Awards in 2020 and 2021.

=== Fares ===
Ticket rates effective June 2025
Trip limit	Cost for central zone	Cost for suburban zone
Ediny ticket. Valid for metro, monorail, MCC and ground transport. Not valid for MCD.
1 ride	80 ₽	–
Koshelek ticket on the Troika card. Valid for all public transport in Moscow (Metro, MCC, all surface transport, suburban electric trains).
1 ride	67 ₽	90 ₽
90 minutes	100 ₽	–
Ediny ticket on the Troika card. Valid for all metro, monorail, MCC, MCD zones "Central", "Suburban" or land transport.
1 day	375 ₽	–
3 days	720 ₽	–
30 days	3,160 ₽	3,940 ₽
90 days	7,650 ₽	10,080 ₽
365 days	22,650 ₽	29,400 ₽

MCD network is divided between the "Central" and "Suburban" zone. Metro (with the monorail and the MCC) is completely within the Central zone.

Single-trip fares, 1935–2018
Effective date	Price	Remarks
1935-05-15	50 kopecks	
1935-08-01	40 kopecks	with season ticket – 35 kopecks
1935-10-01	30 kopecks	with season ticket – 25 kopecks
1942-05-31	40 kopecks	
1948-08-16	50 kopecks	Banknotes were cut in value to one-tenth but most prices stayed the same
1961-01-01	5 kopecks	redenomination; turnstiles accepted 5 kopek coins
1991-04-02	15 kopecks	Turnstiles accepted three 5 kopeck coins (written 5+5+5)
1992-03-01	50 kopecks	5 kopeck coins were replaced by turnstile tokens
1992-06-24	1 ruble	
1992-12-01	3 rubles	
1993-02-16	6 rubles	
1993-06-25	10 rubles	
1993-10-15	30 rubles	
1994-01-01	50 rubles	
1994-03-18	100 rubles	
1994-06-23	150 rubles	
1994-09-21	250 rubles	
1994-12-20	400 rubles	
1995-03-20	600 rubles	
1995-07-21	800 rubles	
1995-09-20	1,000 rubles	
1995-12-21	1,500 rubles	
1997-06-11	2,000 rubles	
1998-01-01	2 rubles	Redenomination due to post-Soviet inflation
1998-09-01	3 rubles	
1999-01-01	4 rubles	
2000-07-15	5 rubles	
2002-10-01	7 rubles	
2004-04-01	10 rubles	
2005-01-01	13 rubles	Monorail fare is 50 rubles (25 rubles discount fare), no other tickets are valid on monorail
2006-01-01	15 rubles	
2007-01-01	17 rubles	
2008-01-01	19 rubles	Monorail fare is equal to the metro fare (reduced to 19 rubles), and only special monthly tickets also available and valid on this line
2009-01-01	22 rubles	
2010-01-01	26 rubles	
2011-01-01	28 rubles	Russian Railways fare in Moscow fare principles are separated and the fare did not increase (26 rubles) unlike in earlier years.
2013-01-01	28 rubles	minor change: Monorail fare included in all metro fares, first transfer in 90 minutes does not charge
2013-04-02	30 rubles	Single journey fare increased. Most other kinds of fares are lowered. New: 90 minute fare.
2014-01-01	30–40 rubles	Single and double fare increased. 5–60 pass fare, and all 90 minute fare are stayed. Russian railway fare in Moscow increased to 28 rubles.
2016-01-01	32–50 rubles	All ticket fares increased. Single fare increased to 50 rubles or 32 rubles (by Troika e-wallet). All unlimited fare are stayed.
2017-01-01	35–55 rubles	All ticket fares increased. Single fare increased to 55 rubles or 35 rubles (by Troika e-wallet). All |-unlimited fare are stayed.
2018-01-02	36–55 rubles	Single fare increased by 1 ruble, only while paying by Troika e-wallet. 90 minutes fare increased from 54 to 56 rubles.
2019-01-02	38–55 rubles	Single fare increased by 2 rubles, while paying Troika card. 90 minutes tickets increased by 3 rubles.
2019-12-09	38–55 rubles	4 of 10 railway lines included in metro fare; central zone does not require (0–2 zones), surburbian +7RUR (but 7 RUR is difference only, 2–3 zones cost 23 RUR as earlier)
2020-02-01	40–57 rubles	fares increased by 2 rubles, season tickets stayed. Also opened Ostafievo in zone 5 that caused to lower some fares is you set as destation and course of another ticket
2020-04-21	40 rubles	Till 2020-06-09 COVID-19 restriction: single fare tickets are eliminated, bank cards disabled till 9 June, some discount ticked also blocked (dates non shown)
2020-02-01	42–60 rubles	fares raised except 90/365 days

== Passenger services ==
=== Passenger Mobility Center ===
The Passenger Mobility Center was created within the Moscow Metro in October 2013 to aid passengers with reduced mobility, encompassing individuals with hearing or visual impairments, mobility limitations, senior citizens, large families, and parents with strollers. Today, the PMC staff escorts passengers at the metro, MCC, MCD, buses and trams.

Since its inception, PMC has assisted over 1.15 million passengers with reduced mobility. In 2023, PMC staff escorted approximately 70,000 passengers, representing a 9% increase compared to 2022.

=== Wayfinding ===
In 2013, the Moscow Metro started to develop the new principles of wayfinding, including a redesigned metro map. Today, these principles have been applied to all of Moscow Transport. The new system is characterized by the following features:

- The single font of the Moscow Transport – Moscow Sans
- More concise and comprehensible signage
- Geographical maps across the city that includes information on surrounding streets and landmarks
- Use of easily understandable pictograms instead of words (e.g., line numbers)
- Assignment of numbers to each metro exit
- Floor signage on stations
- Accessibility information for passengers with reduced mobility
- Digital wayfinding screens above the doors in the newest train models
- A standardized design for temporary announcements

== Digital services ==
=== Mobile app ===
Launched in 2017, the Moscow Metro mobile app offers a range of useful features for passengers:

- Troika card management (purchase tickets, view pass and transaction history, set up auto-payment)
- Transfer of Troika card balance to a new card in case of loss
- Identification of less crowded carriages on arriving trains
- Temporary suspension of annual passes (once per year for 14 days)
- Route planning
- Linking of the Moscow Resident Social Card
- Purchase of intercity bus tickets
- Registration for biometric payment service
- Reporting of lost items
- Request for assistance from the Passenger Mobility Service
- Chatbot access

As of March 2024, the app has been downloaded 13 million times and is used by 2 million people monthly.

=== Chatbot ===
In 2020, the Moscow Metro introduced Aleksandra, a chatbot that has since become the official chatbot for all types of urban transport in Moscow. As of February 2024, Aleksandra has answered over 6.8 million questions and is equipped to respond to over 58,000 inquiries related to Moscow's urban transport system.

== Statistics ==
Ridership statistics
Passengers (2018)	2,500,400,000 passengers
—— full-fare	1,812,900,000 passengers
—— privileged category	473,500,000 passengers
—— pupils and students	214,000,000 passengers
Maximum daily ridership	9,715,635 passengers
Revenue from fares (2005)	15.9974 billion rubles
Average passenger trip	14.93 kilometres (9.28 mi)
Line statistics
Total lines length	333.3 kilometres (207.1 mi)
Number of lines	15
Longest line	Arbatsko-Pokrovskaya Line (43.5 kilometres (27.0 mi))
Shortest line	Kakhovskaya Line (3.3 kilometres (2.1 mi))
Longest section	Strogino–Krylatskoye (6.7 kilometres (4.2 mi))
Shortest section	Vystavochnaya–Mezhdunarodnaya (502 metres (1,647 ft))
Station statistics
Number of stations	228
— transfer stations	68
— transfer points	29
— surface/elevated	16
Deepest station	Park Pobedy (84 metres (276 ft))
Shallowest underground station	Pechatniki
Station with the longest platform	Vorobyovy Gory (Metro) (282 metres (925 ft))
Number of stations with a single entrance	73
Infrastructure statistics
Number of turnstiles with automatic control on entrances	2,374
Number of stations with escalators	125
Number of escalators	631
— including Monorail stations	18
Longest escalator	126 metres (413 ft) (Park Pobedy)
Total number of ventilation shafts	393
Number of local ventilation systems in use	4,965
Number of medical assistance points (2005)	46
Total length of all escalators	65.4 kilometres (40.6 mi)
Rolling stock statistics
Number of train maintenance depots	16
Total number of train runs per day	9,915
Average speed:	
— commercial	41.71 kilometres per hour (25.92 mph)
— technical (2005)	48.85 kilometres per hour (30.35 mph)
Total number of cars (average per day)	4,428
Cars in service (average per day)	3,397
Annual run of all cars	722,100,000 kilometres (448,700,000 mi)
Average daily run of a car	556.2 kilometres (345.6 mi)
Average passengers per car	53 people
Timetable fulfillment (reliability rate)	99.96%
Minimum average interval	90 sec
Staff statistics
Total number of employees	34,792 people
— males	18,291 people
— females	16,448 people

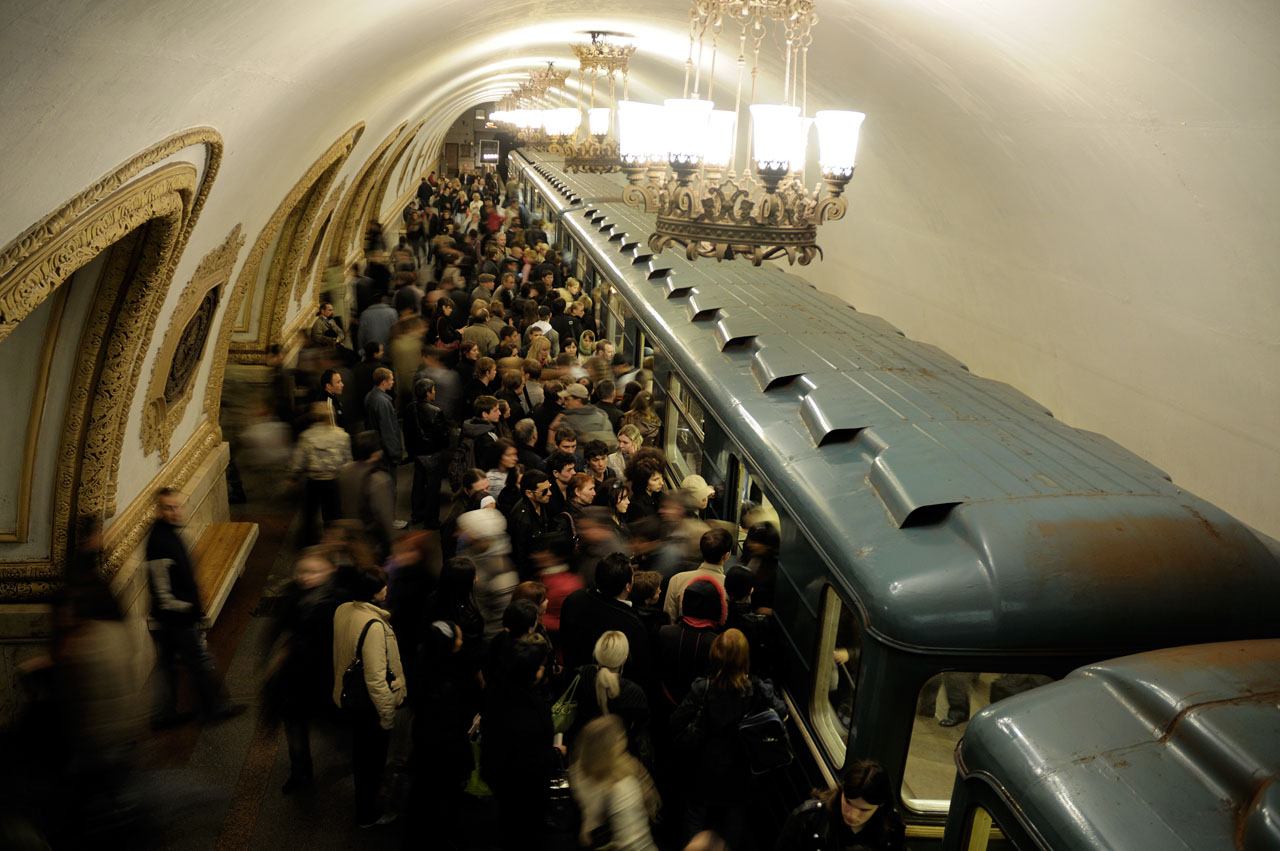
Moscow Metro is one of the busiest metro systems in the world.

== Notable incidents ==
=== 1977 bombing ===
On 8 January 1977, a bomb was reported to have killed 7 and seriously injured 33. It went off in a crowded train between Izmaylovskaya and Pervomayskaya stations. Three Armenians were later arrested, charged and executed in connection with the incident.

=== 1981 station fires ===
In June 1981, there were fires at the Oktyabrskaya and Prospekt Mira stations. There were no deaths.

=== 1982 escalator accident ===
A fatal accident occurred on 17 February 1982 due to an escalator collapse at the Aviamotornaya station on the Kalininskaya Line. Eight people were killed and 30 injured due to a pileup caused by faulty emergency brakes.

=== 1996 murder ===
In 1996, an American-Russian businessman Paul Tatum was murdered at the Kiyevskaya Metro station. He was shot dead by a man carrying a concealed Kalashnikov gun.

=== 2000 bombings ===
On 8 August 2000, a strong blast in a Metro underpass at Pushkinskaya metro station in the center of Moscow claimed the lives of 12, with 150 injured. A homemade bomb equivalent to 800 grams of TNT had been left in a bag near a kiosk.

=== 2004 bombings ===
On 6 February 2004, an explosion wrecked a train between the Avtozavodskaya and Paveletskaya stations on the Zamoskvoretskaya Line, killing 41 and wounding over 100. Chechen terrorists were blamed. A later investigation concluded that a Karachay-Cherkessian resident had carried out a suicide bombing. The same group organized another attack on 31 August 2004, killing 10 and injuring more than 50 others.

=== 2005 Moscow blackout ===
On 25 May 2005, a citywide blackout halted operation on some lines. The following lines, however, continued operations: Sokolnicheskaya, Zamoskvoretskaya from Avtozavodskaya to Rechnoy Vokzal, Arbatsko-Pokrovskaya, Filyovskaya, Koltsevaya, Kaluzhsko-Rizhskaya from Bitsevskiy Park to Oktyabrskaya-Radialnaya and from Prospekt Mira-Radialnaya to Medvedkovo, Tagansko-Krasnopresnenskaya, Kalininskaya, Serpukhovsko-Timiryazevskaya from Serpukhovskaya to Altufyevo and Lyublinskaya from Chkalovskaya to Dubrovka. There was no service on the Kakhovskaya and Butovskaya lines. The blackout severely affected the Zamoskvoretskaya and Serpukhovsko-Timiryazevskaya lines, where initially all service was disrupted because of trains halted in tunnels in the southern part of city (most affected by the blackout). Later, limited service resumed and passengers stranded in tunnels were evacuated. Some lines were only slightly impacted by the blackout, which mainly affected southern Moscow; the north, east and western parts of the city experienced little or no disruption.

=== 2006 billboard incident ===
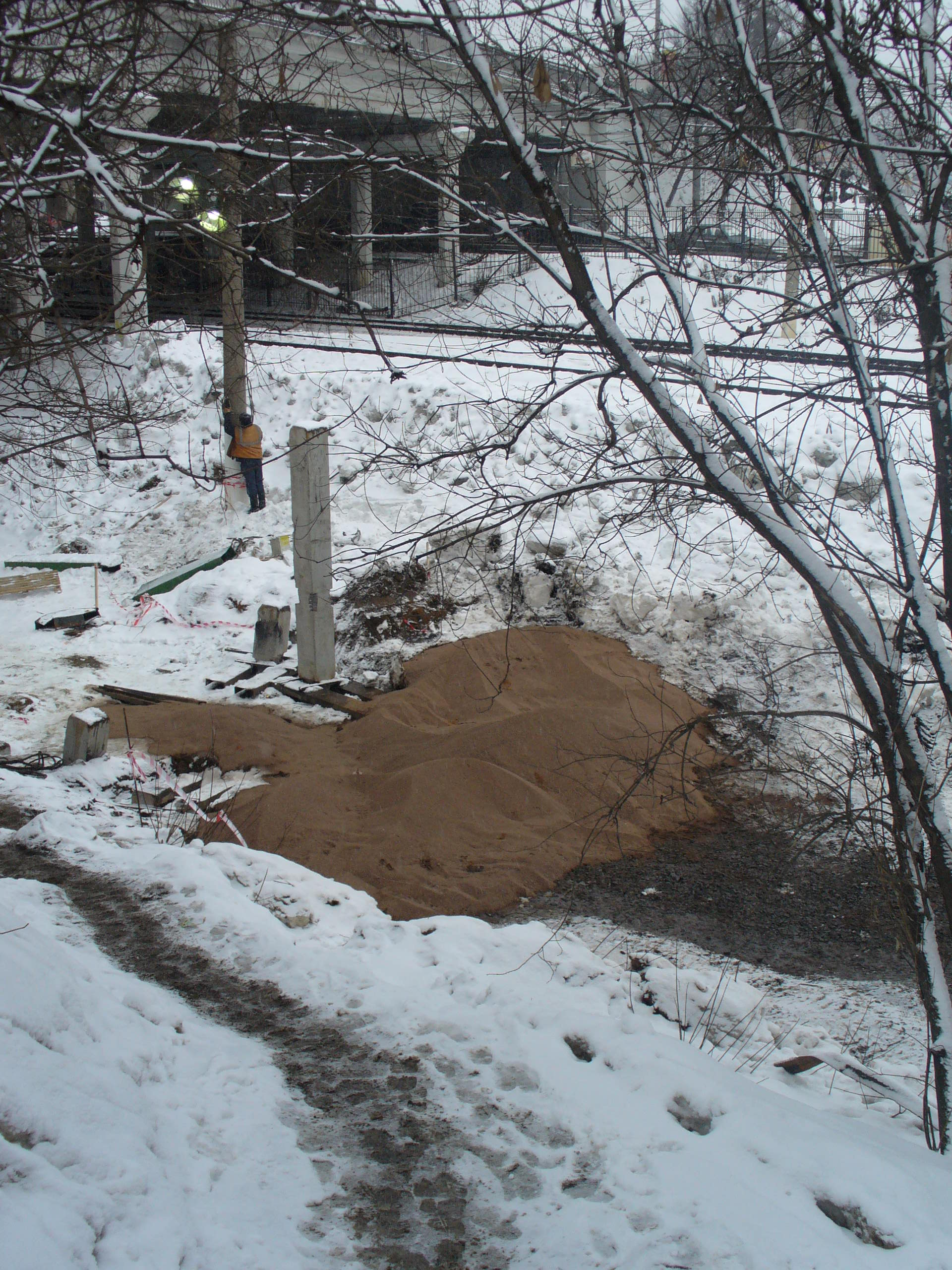
Site of construction pile incident on next day after event (2006)

On 19 March 2006, a construction pile from an unauthorized billboard installation was driven through a tunnel roof, hitting a train between the Sokol and Voikovskaya stations on the Zamoskvoretskaya Line. No injuries were reported.

=== 2010 bombing ===
On 29 March 2010, two bombs exploded on the Sokolnicheskaya Line, killing 40 and injuring 102 others. The first bomb went off at the Lubyanka station on the Sokolnicheskaya Line at 7:56, during the morning rush hour. At least 26 were killed in the first explosion, of which 14 were in the rail car where it took place. A second explosion occurred at the Park Kultury station at 8:38, roughly forty minutes after the first one. Fourteen people were killed in that blast. The Caucasus Emirate later claimed responsibility for the bombings.

=== 2014 pile incident ===
On 25 January 2014, at 15:37 a construction pile from a Moscow Central Circle construction site was driven through a tunnel roof between Avtozavodskaya and Kolomenskaya stations on the Zamoskvoretskaya Line. The train operator applied emergency brakes, and the train did not crash into the pile. Passengers were evacuated from the tunnel, with no injures reported. The normal line operation resumed the same day at 19:50.

=== 2014 derailment ===
On 15 July 2014, a train derailed between Park Pobedy and Slavyansky Bulvar on the Arbatsko-Pokrovskaya Line, killing 24 people and injuring dozens more.

=== 2025 restoration of Stalin's relief ===
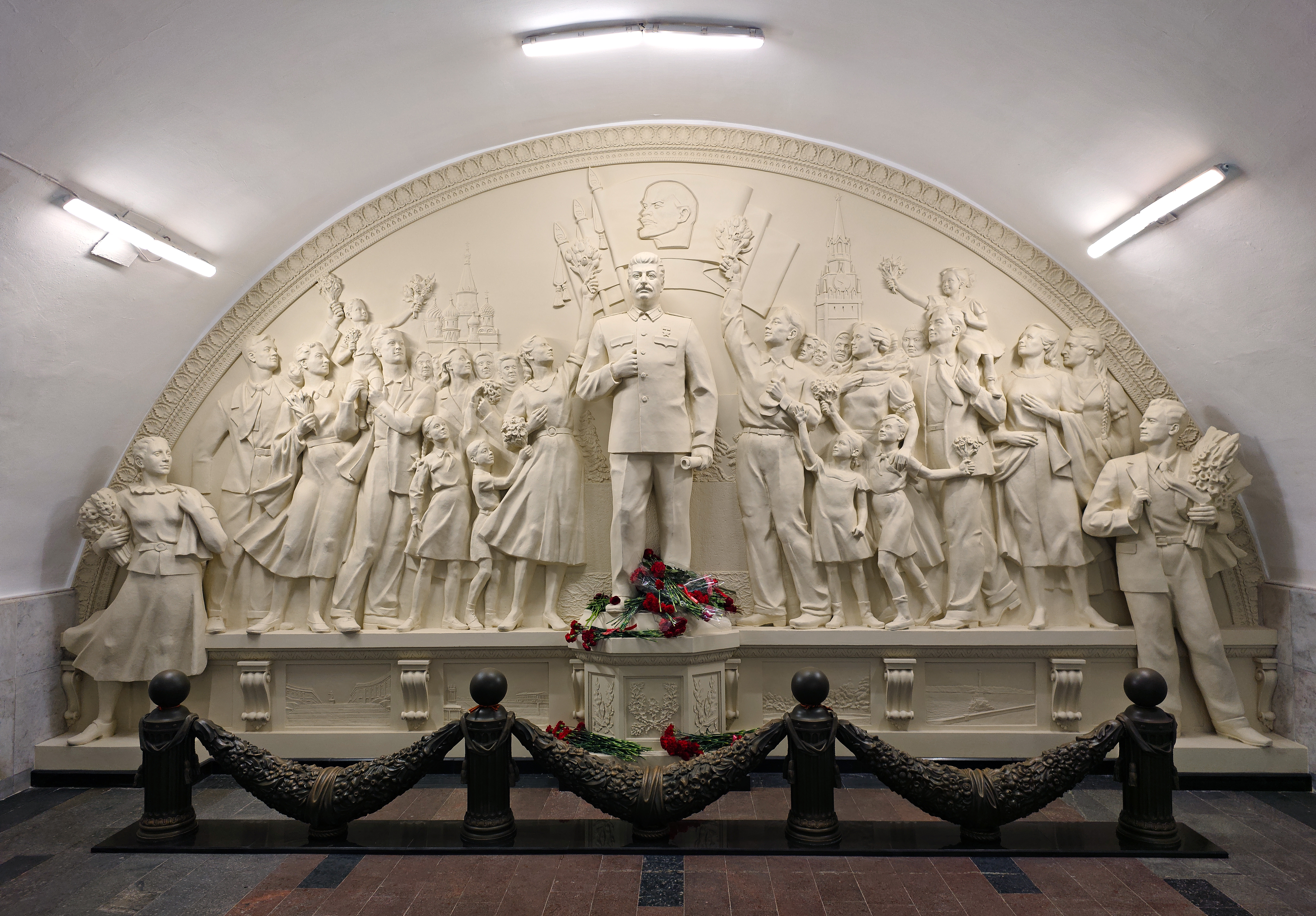
Restored Stalin relief at Taganskaya metro station in Moscow, May 2025

On 15 May 2025, a bas-relief wall panel depicting Joseph Stalin was installed in the connecting passage between the two Taganskaya stations. An earlier version of this sculpture at this location was removed in 1966, and Stalin himself was removed from the relief during the de-Stalinization campaign in the 1950s. Russian human rights activist Yan Rachinsky wrote that "among Stalin’s victims were more than 750 construction workers and employees of the Moscow Metro. More than 140 were executed, including the subway’s first director, Petrikovsky (his name appears in a Stalinist execution list dated August 20, 1938). There’s no mention of these people anywhere in the subway today, but the man responsible for their deaths is honored with a life-sized statue."

== Metro-2 ==
Conspiracy theorists have claimed that a second and deeper metro system code-named "D-6", designed for emergency evacuation of key city personnel in case of nuclear attack during the Cold War, exists under military jurisdiction. It is believed that it consists of a single track connecting the Kremlin, chief HQ (General Staff –Genshtab), Lubyanka (FSB Headquarters), the Ministry of Defense and several other secret installations. There are alleged to be entrances to the system from several civilian buildings, such as the Russian State Library, Moscow State University (MSU) and at least two stations of the regular Metro. It is speculated that these would allow for the evacuation of a small number of randomly chosen civilians, in addition to most of the elite military personnel. A suspected junction between the secret system and the regular Metro is supposedly behind the Sportivnaya station on the Sokolnicheskaya Line. The final section of this system was supposedly completed in 1997.

== In popular culture ==
The Moscow Metro is the central location and namesake for the Metro series, where during a nuclear war, Moscow's inhabitants are driven down into the Moscow Metro, which has been designed as a fallout shelter, with the various stations being turned into makeshift settlements.

In 2012, an art film was released about a catastrophe in the Moscow underground.

== See also ==
- List of Moscow Metro stations
- Expansion timeline of the Moscow Metro
- List of metro systems
- Moscow Metro ridership statistics (in Russian)
- Metro dogs
- Trams in Moscow
- Metro 2033
