= Luzhniki =

Luzhniki may refer to:

- Luzhniki (village), a village (selo) in Moscow Oblast, Russia
- Luzhniki Olympic Complex, a sport complex in Moscow, Russia
  - Luzhniki Palace of Sports, an arena in Luzhniki Olympic Complex
  - Luzhniki Small Sports Arena, an arena in Luzhniki Olympic Complex
  - Luzhniki Stadium, a stadium in Luzhniki Olympic Complex
- Luzhniki (Moscow Central Circle), a train station nearby the complex
