= Gorky Park (Moscow) =

Central park in Moscow, Russia

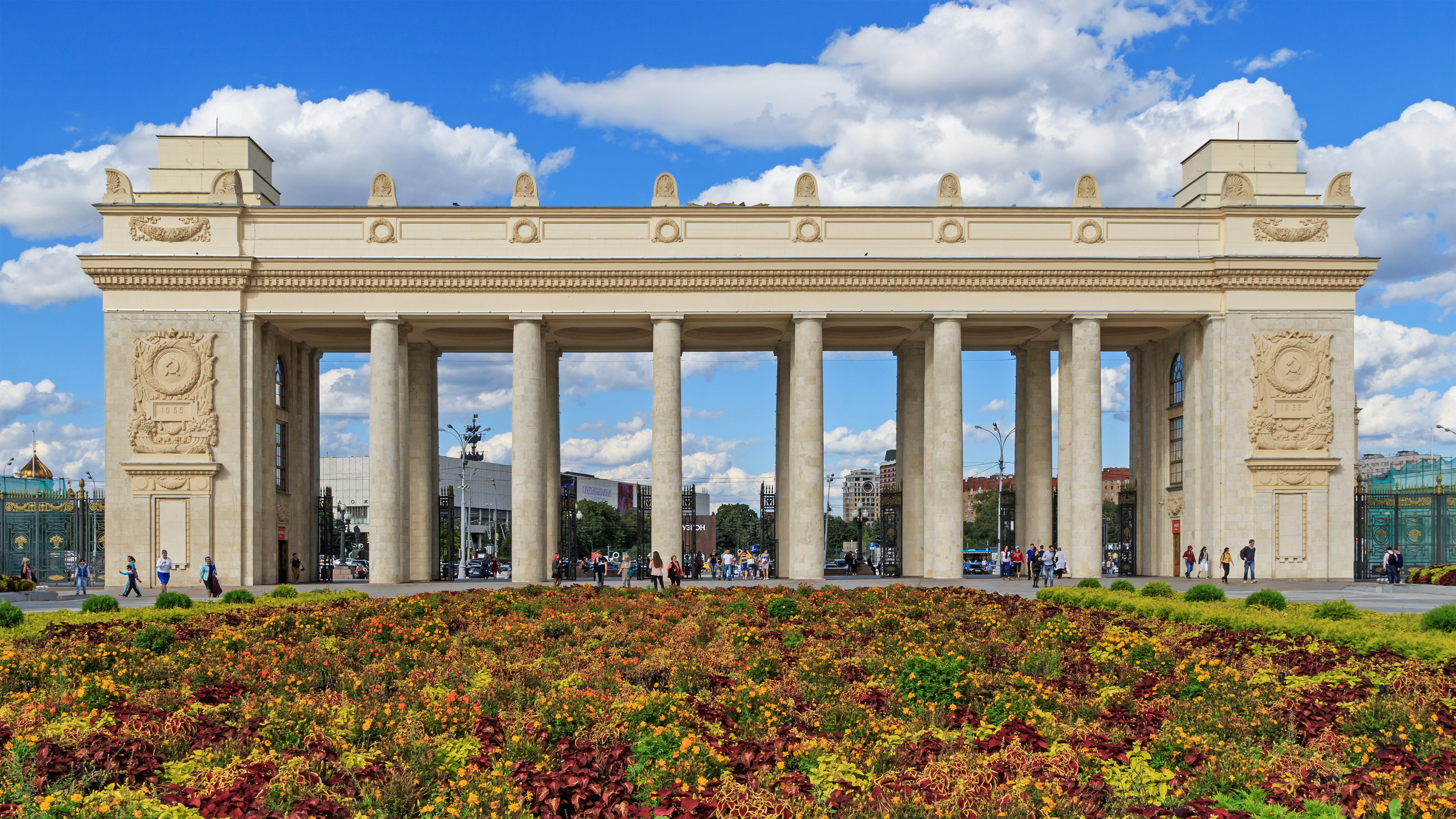
- The colonnaded main portal of Gorky Park
- Location in Moscow
- Location: Moscow, Russia
- Coordinates: 55°43′42″N 37°36′0″E
- Area: 300 acres (120 ha)
- Open: 1928
- Public transit: Vorobyovy Gory; Park Kultury; Park Kultury; Oktyabrskaya; Oktyabrskaya Shabolovskaya Leninsky Prospekt; Ploshchad Gagarina
- Website: parkgorkogo.ru

Gorky Central Park of Culture and Leisure (Russian: Центральный парк культуры и отдыха (ЦПКиО) имени Горького, romanized: Tsentralny park kultury i otdykha imeni Gorkogo, IPA: [tsɨnˈtralʲnɨj ˈpark kʊlʲˈturɨ i ˈodːɨxə ˈimʲɪnʲɪ ˈɡorʲkəvɐ]) is a central park in Moscow, named after Maxim Gorky. In August 2018, the Park's 90th anniversary was celebrated.

== History ==
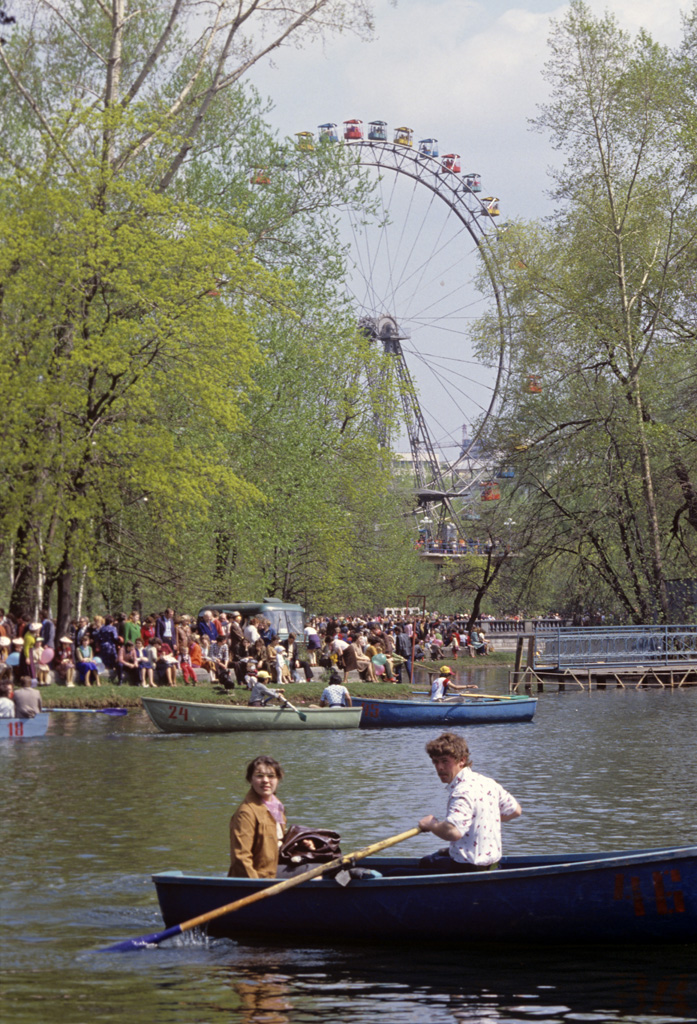
Pond in Gorky Central Park of Culture and Leisure, 1982

Gorky Park, located at Krymsky Val and situated just across the Moskva River from Park Kultury Metro station, opened in 1928. The park followed the plan of Konstantin Melnikov, a widely known Soviet avant-garde and constructivist architect, and amalgamated the extensive gardens of the old Golitsyn Hospital and of the Neskuchny Palace, covering an area of 300 acres (120 ha) along the river. The history of the Neskuchny Garden can be traced back to 1753, when it emerged in the area between Kaluzhskaya Zastava and Trubetskoy Moskva river-side estate. The neighboring area to Neskuchny Garden, from Krymsky Val to Neskuchny Garden, received little attention right up until the 1920s. Initially it was covered with park gardens, meadows and vegetable gardens belonging to the owners of neighboring estates. It formed a wasteland by the end of the 19th century, and served as a waste heap.

The First All-Russian Agricultural and Handicraft Industries Exhibition opened in 1923 on a former rubbish dump in Moscow. The area had been cleared during the course of communist community work days. A resolution for the exhibition was passed on 19 October 1922 and the exhibition opened one and a half years later on 19 May 1923. After bidding for the exhibition's layout plan, which proposed four arrangements—Sokol, Khodynskoye Pole, Petrovsko-Razumovsky park and the river areas near Krymsky bridge—preference was given to the last option.

On 15 March 1928 by a resolution of the Presidium of the Moscow Council, the Agricultural and Handicraft Industries Exhibition was enlarged and transformed into the Central Park of Culture and Leisure—the country's first park of its kind, which was referred to as an outdoor "cultural enterprise". In 1932 the park was named after M. A. Gorky. The idea of a need for a central park of culture and leisure in Moscow arose in the late 1920s in relation to Moscow's reconstruction with notions of a socialist "city of the future". The park was named after the writer and political activist Maxim Gorky.

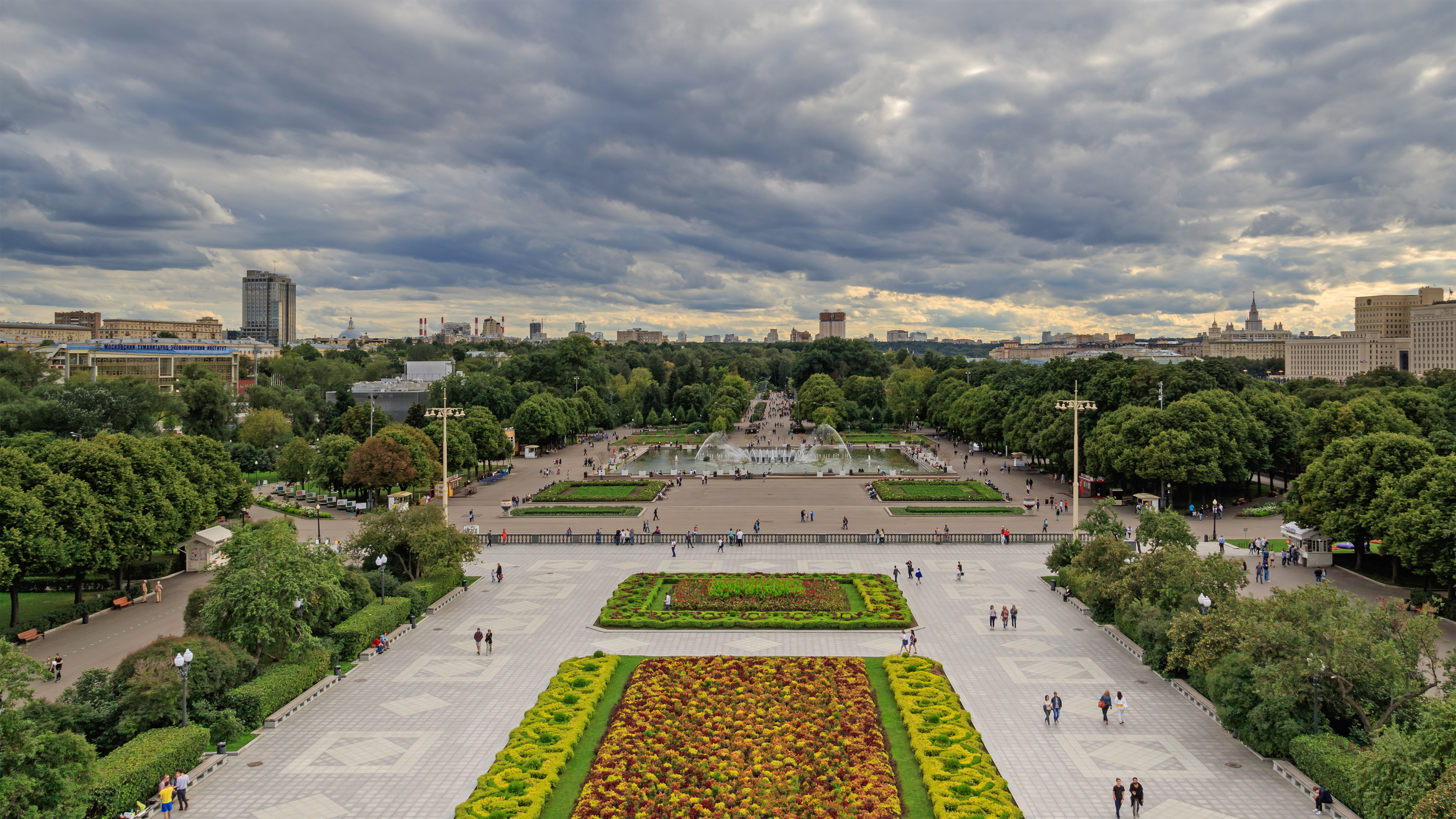
View from the roof of the main Gorky Park portal (2016)

== Transformation ==
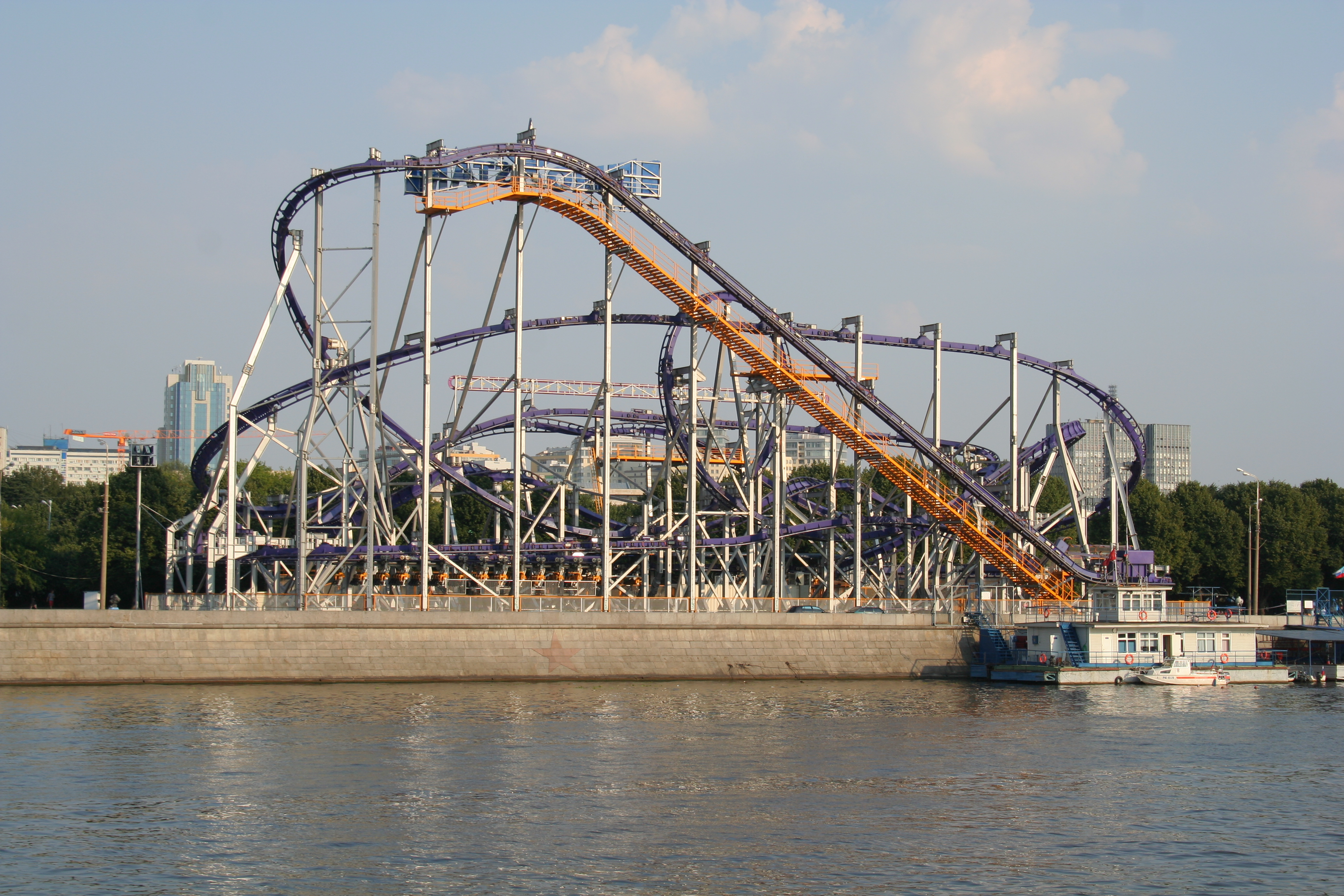
Gorky Park Roller Coaster (removed in 2011)

In 2011 Gorky Park underwent a major reconstruction. New director of Central Park of Culture and Leisure Sergey Kapkov ordered the demolition of about 100 attractions and illegal objects. More than two thousand square meters of new asphalt roadbed was laid on the site of demolished objects and 1.9 ha of new lawns and flowerbeds were laid out. All amusement rides but one, a two deck carousel, have been removed in order to transform the place into a recreational zone. Abandoned buildings, carts, tents, advertising structures and attractions were cleaned in the process. Renovation of monuments, cleaning the ponds and delivering soil and grass turf was started. Gorky Park was transformed in several months, becoming the first Russian park that could now compete with the leading parks of the world. A 15,000 square meter ice rink, with separate zones for children, hockey, dancing, and general skating, was officially opened in December 2011. In winter, a skating school of Alexei Yagudin runs on the skating rink.

Shortly after he took over the park, Sergei Kapkov was appointed to the role of Moscow Government Minister and Head of the Department of Cultural Heritage. Olga Zakharova has since replaced Sergei Kapkov and has held the position ever since.

== In literature and the arts ==
- The Moscow river and park is referenced in the song Wind of Change, by German hard rock band Scorpions.
- The novel and movie Gorky Park take their titles from the park.
