= Luzhniki Palace of Sports =

Sporting arena in Moscow

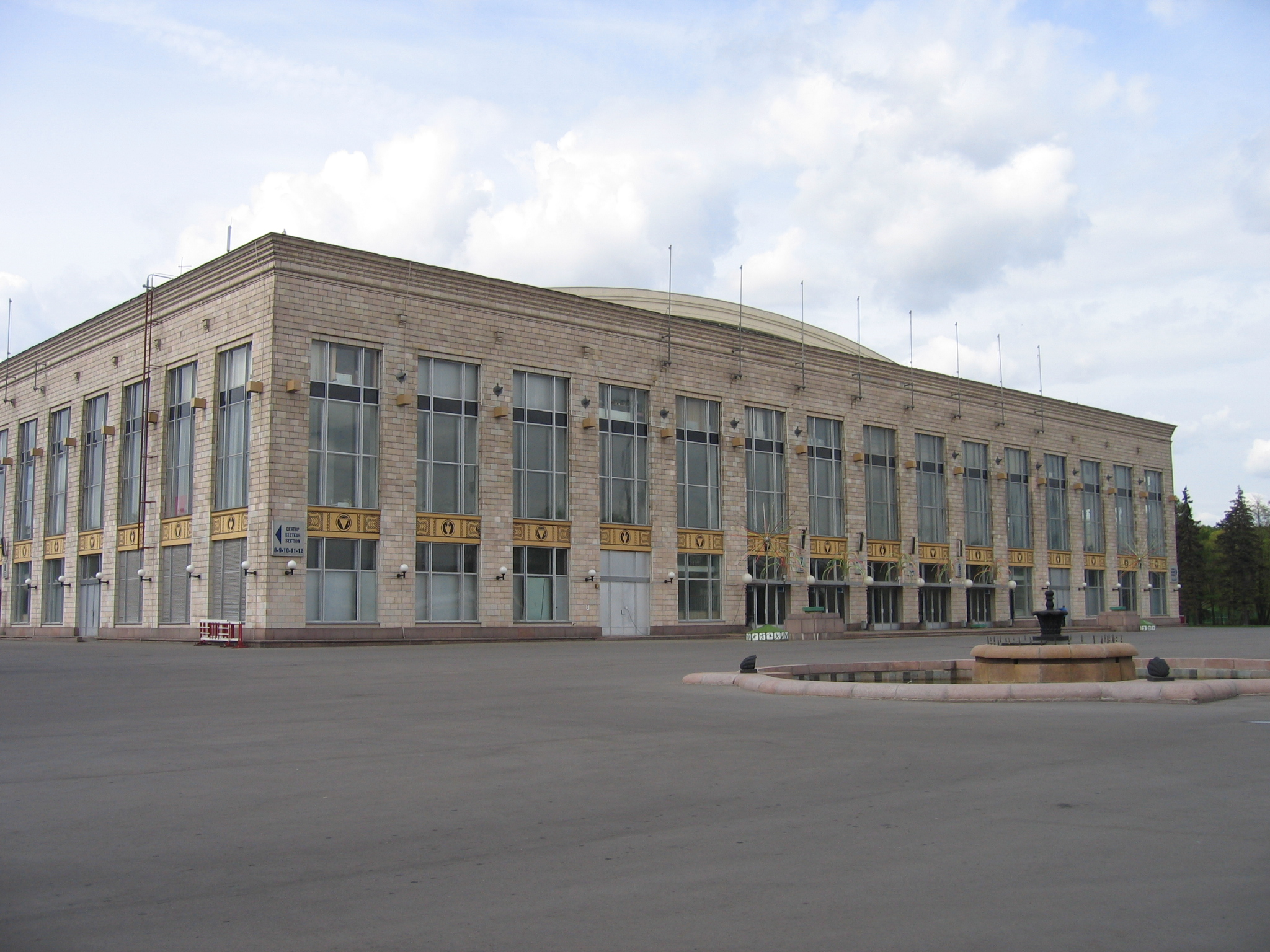
- Arena in 2007
- Interactive map of Luzhniki Palace of Sports
- Former names: Palace of Sports of the Central Lenin Stadium (1956–1992)
- Location: Khamovniki District, Moscow, Russia
- Coordinates: 55.722440°N 37.547525°E
- Capacity: 11,500 (formerly 13,700)
- Public transit: Sportivnaya; Luzhniki

Construction
- Opened: 1956
- Renovated: 2002
- Demolished: 20 December 2023
- Rebuilt: 2024; 2026

Tenant
- HC Dynamo Moscow (until 2000)

Website
- www.luzhniki.ru

Luzhniki Palace of Sports, formerly the Palace of Sports of the Central Lenin Stadium, was a sports arena in Moscow, Russia, a part of the Luzhniki Olympic Complex. Built in 1956, it originally had a spectator capacity of 13,700. It was rebuilt in 2002, and eventually demolished in 2023, with plans to construct a replacement arena on the site.

The arena hosted the world and European championships in ice hockey, gymnastics, volleyball, basketball, boxing, skateboarding and other sports. It hosted several games during the 1972 Summit Series tournament between the Soviet Union and Canada and was a venue for gymnastics and judo events at the 1980 Summer Olympics.

It was primarily used for ice hockey as the home arena for HC Dynamo Moscow until the year 2000, when the club moved to Luzhniki Small Sports Arena. In 2002, the arena underwent major reconstruction and the seating capacity was lowered to 11,500. The arena subsequently hosted the 2005 World Figure Skating Championships. Demolition of the arena began in December 2023, which surprised some residents who did not expect that the reconstruction of the building meant its complete demolition.

== Notable sporting events ==
- 1956, 1959, 1963, 1967, 1971, and 1979 Spartakiad of the Peoples of the USSR
- EuroBasket 1965
- 1957, 1973, 1979, and 1986 Ice Hockey World Championships
- 1959 FIBA World Championship for Women
- 1986 Goodwill Games
- 1962 men's and women's Volleyball World Championships
- Games 5–8 of the 1972 Canada-USSR ice hockey Summit Series
- Games 5–8 of the 1974 series against Canada
- 2001 UEFA Futsal Championship
- 2005 World Figure Skating Championships

== Notable concerts ==
- Big Country – 1988
- Rising Force – 1989
- Cannibal Corpse – 1993
- Scorpions – 1997
- Scooter – 2000
- Rammstein – 2001
- Judas Priest - 2005
- Kraftwerk – 2004
- Depeche Mode & The Bravery – 2006
- Muse – 2007
- Dream Theater, Nightwish – 2009
- Smokie – 2011

== See also ==
- Luzhniki Olympic Complex

Events and tenants
Preceded by Unknown venue, Cortina; Sportovní hala, Prague; Sportovní hala, Prague; Sportovní hala, Prague	Ice Hockey World Championships; Venue; 1957; 1973; 1979; 1986	Succeeded by Unknown venue, Oslo; Unknown venue, Helsinki; Scandinavium, Gothenburg; Unknown venue, Vienna
Preceded by Centennial Hall; Wrocław	Eurobasket; Final venue 1965	Succeeded by Helsinki Ice Hall; Helsinki
Preceded by Palacio de Deportes; Granada	UEFA Futsal Championship; Final Venue; 2001	Succeeded by PalaMaggiò; Caserta
