= War Trophies Exhibition (Moscow) =

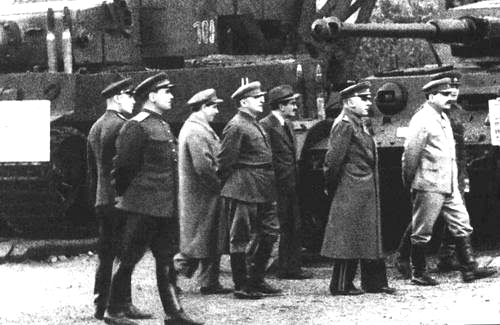
Lavrentiy Beria, Anastas Mikoyan, Kliment Voroshilov and Joseph Stalin at the exhibition of German war trophies in Gorky Park. Moscow, 1943

The War Trophies Exhibition was an exhibition of trophies taken by the Red Army from Nazi Germany during the Great Patriotic War, which was held in the Gorky Park in Moscow from June 22, 1943 to October 1, 1948. The exhibition was attended by over 7.5 million people.

== Creation ==
The decision on creation of the exhibition was adopted by State Defense Committee on April 13, 1943. Exhibition opened on June 22, 1943.

== Exposition ==
The exposition was divided into 6 sections:

- Artillery;
- Aviation;
- Automotive;
- Armored vehicles;
- Engineering and technical;
- Military logistics.

== Links ==
- Железо со всей Европы / М. Коломиец // Оружие. — 2000. — № 4. — С. 34-44.
- "Трофеи великих битв, 1943". Soviet documentary.
