= Leninsky Avenue, Moscow =

Thoroughfare in Moscow, Russia

Leninsky Avenue
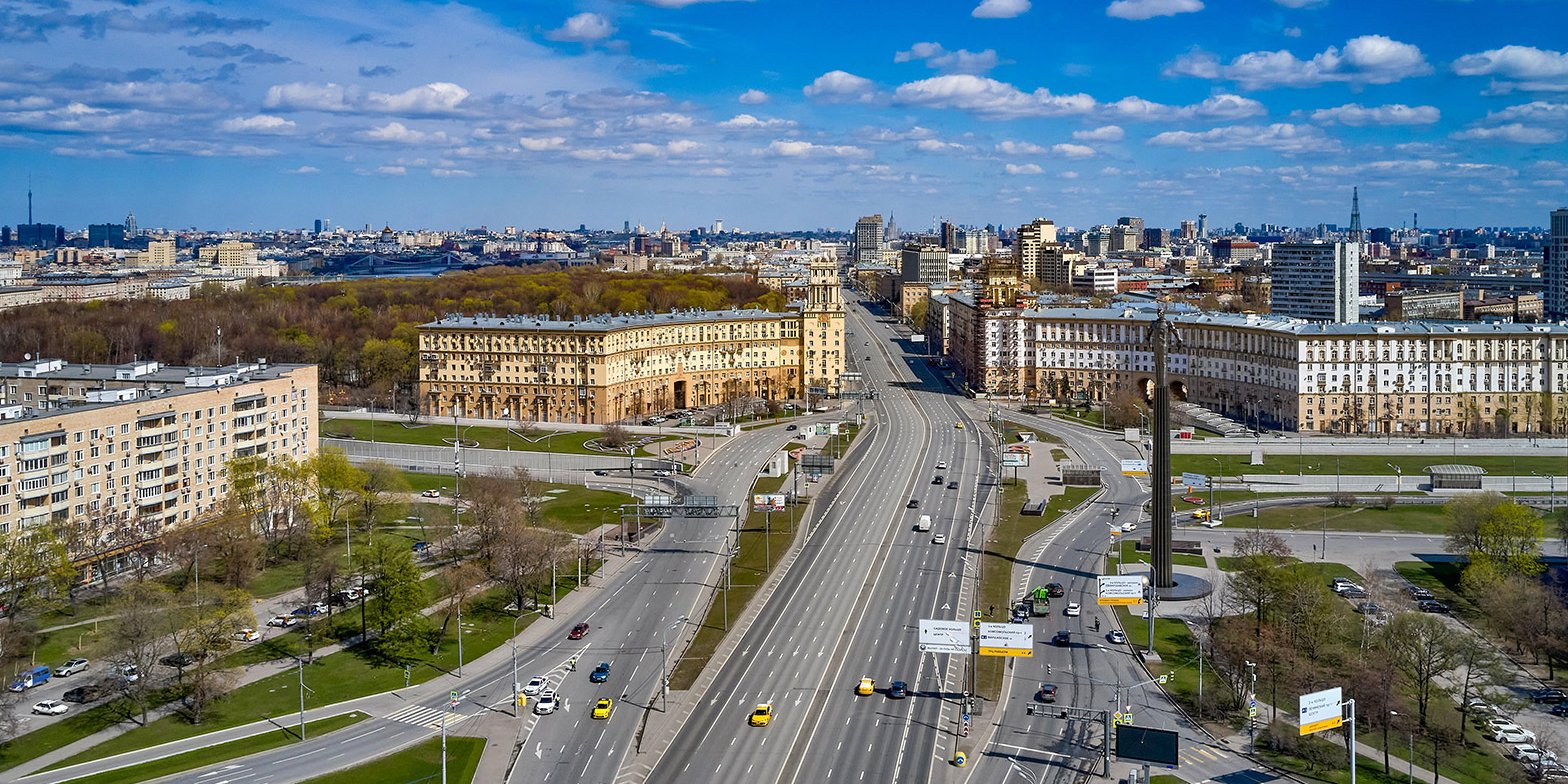
- Interactive map of Leninsky Avenue
- Native name: Ленинский проспект (Russian)
- Length: 16 km (9.9 mi)
- Location: Moscow
- Nearest metro station: Oktyabrskaya; Ploshchad Gagarina; Leninsky Prospekt; Novatorskaya; Troparyovo
- Coordinates: 55°41′04″N 37°32′23″E

Leninsky Avenue (Russian: Ле́нинский проспе́кт "Leninsky prospekt") is a major avenue in Moscow, Russia, that runs in the south-western direction between Kaluzhskaya Square in the central part of the city through Gagarin Square to the Moscow Ring Road. It is a part of the M3 highway which continues from Moscow to Kaluga and Bryansk to the border with Ukraine, and used to provide connections with Kiev and Odessa. It is also a part of the European route E101 connecting Moscow and Kyiv. It is the second-widest street in Moscow after Leningradsky Avenue. Its width varies between 108 and 120 metres.

== Location ==
Leninsky Avenue continues north beyond Kaluzhskaya Square as Yakimanka Street and southwest beyond the Ring Road as Kievskoye Highway. Oktyabrskaya, Leninsky Prospekt, Novatorskaya, and Troparyovo are the only four metro stations located at the avenue, the second one being named after the avenue itself.

The major intersections are with the Zhitnaya Street/Krymsky Val (Kaluzhskaya Square), Avenue of 60th Anniversary of October Revolution and Kosygina Street (Gagarin Square, where the avenue also crosses the Moscow Little Ring Railway and the Third Ring Road), Universitetsky Avenue, Lomonosovsky Avenue, Obrucheva Street/Lobachevskogo Street, as well as Vernadsky Avenue.

In terms of the administrative division, Leninsky Avenue runs through Yakimanka, Gagarinsky, Lomonosovsky, Obruchevsky, Prospekt Vernadskogo, Tyoply Stan, and Troparyovo-Nikulino Districts.

== History ==
The location of the current avenue has been a road since before the 18th century. Only the area between Kaluzhskaya Square and Kaluzhskaya Zastava Square (currently Gagarin Square) was then included into Moscow, and the name of this stretch was Bolshaya Kaluzhskaya Street. Construction was active in that area between the 18th century and the 1940s. The road continued further as Kaluzhskoye Highway, and then as the highway from Moscow to Kiev. The three stretches were merged in 1957, and the street was given the name of Vladimir Lenin. In the 1940s and the 1950s construction took place along the stretch between Gagarin Square and Kravchenko Street.

== Notable landmarks ==
In the vicinity of the avenue there are landmarks as such as Pioneers Palace and Lebedev Physical Institute.

== Public transportation ==
The stretch between Kaluzhskaya Square and Miklukho-Maklay Street was covered by trolleybus traffic. The whole avenue is covered by public bus traffic, though the routes typically take short stretches of the avenue, and there is no single route which travels through the whole length of the avenue.
