= Sportivnaya (Moscow Metro) =

Moscow Metro station

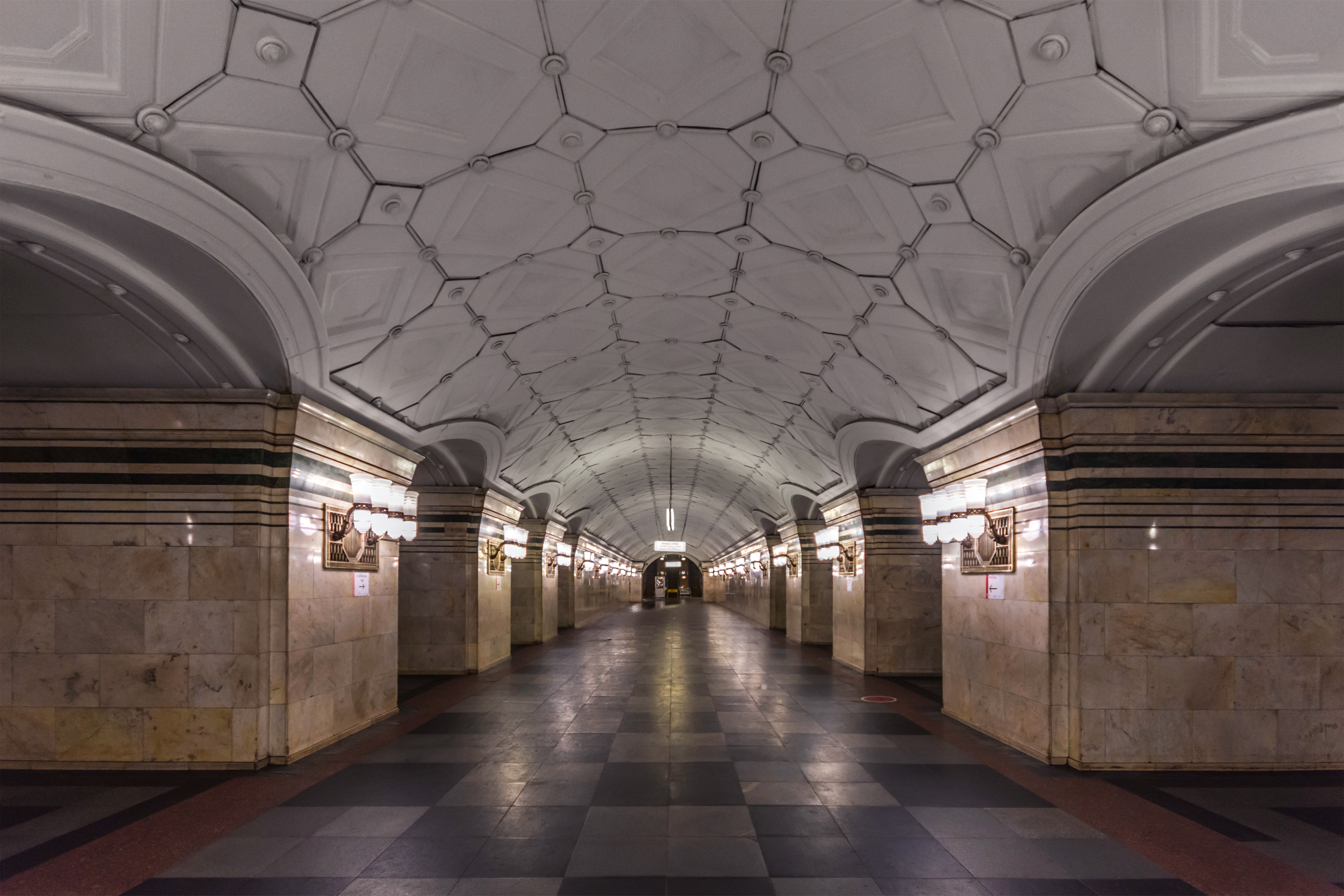

General information
- Location: Khamovniki District; Central Administrative Okrug; Moscow; Russia
- Coordinates: 55.7233°N 37.5639°E
- System: Moscow Metro station
- Owner: Moskovsky Metropoliten
- Line: Sokolnicheskaya line
- Platforms: 1
- Tracks: 2
- Connections: Bus: M3, C12, 15, 64, 216, 255, 806; Trolleybus: 15 (canceled)

Construction
- Structure type: Deep pylon triple-vault station
- Depth: 42 metres (138 ft)
- Platform levels: 1
- Parking: No
- Cycle facilities: No

Other information
- Station code: 015

History
- Opened: 1 May 1957; 69 years ago
- Former names: Luzhniki

Services
Preceding station	Moscow Metro	Following station
Vorobyovy Gory towards Potapovo	Sokolnicheskaya line	Frunzenskaya towards Bulvar Rokossovskogo
Out-of-station interchange
Ploshchad Gagarina anticlockwise / outer	Moscow Central Circle transfer at Luzhniki	Kutuzovskaya clockwise / inner
Route map
Location
- Location within Moscow Metro

Sportivnaya (Russian: Спорти́вная) is a Moscow Metro station on the Sokolnicheskaya line. It is in the Khamovniki District in the Central Administrative Okrug of Moscow. Named for the nearby Luzhniki Olympic Complex, it opened in 1957. Passengers may make out-of-station transfers from Sportivnaya to Luzhniki on the Moscow Central Circle, which is about 200 meters away.

The architects were Nadezhda Bykova, I. Gokhar-Kharmandaryan, Ivan Taranov, and B. Cherepanov. Sportivnaya has white marble pylons with green marble accents and a ceiling of embossed asbestos-cement tiles rather than the usual plaster. The upper two floors of the three-story vestibule are home to the Moscow Metro Museum, which displays 70 years of Metro memorabilia.

== Gallery ==
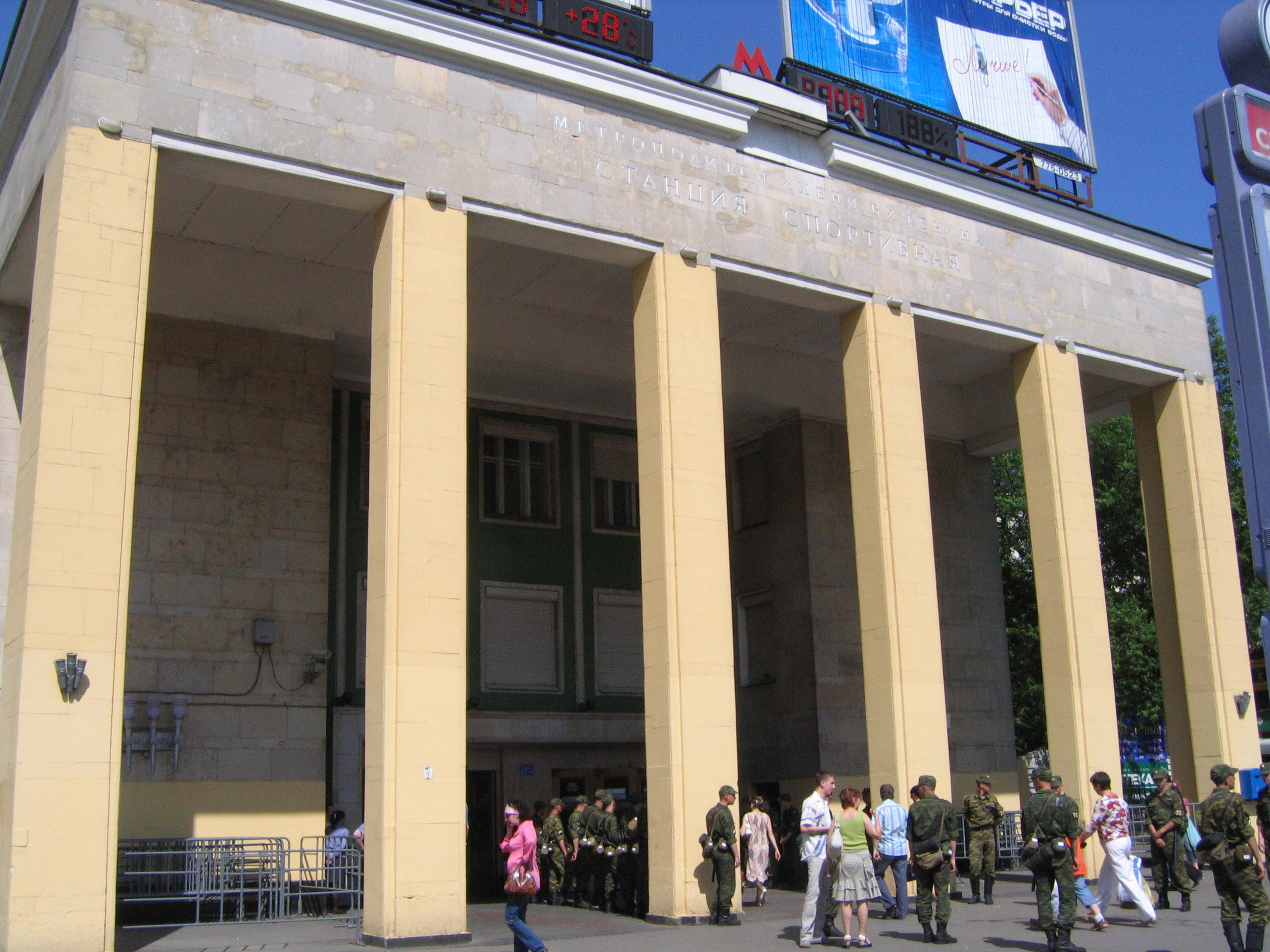
South entrance

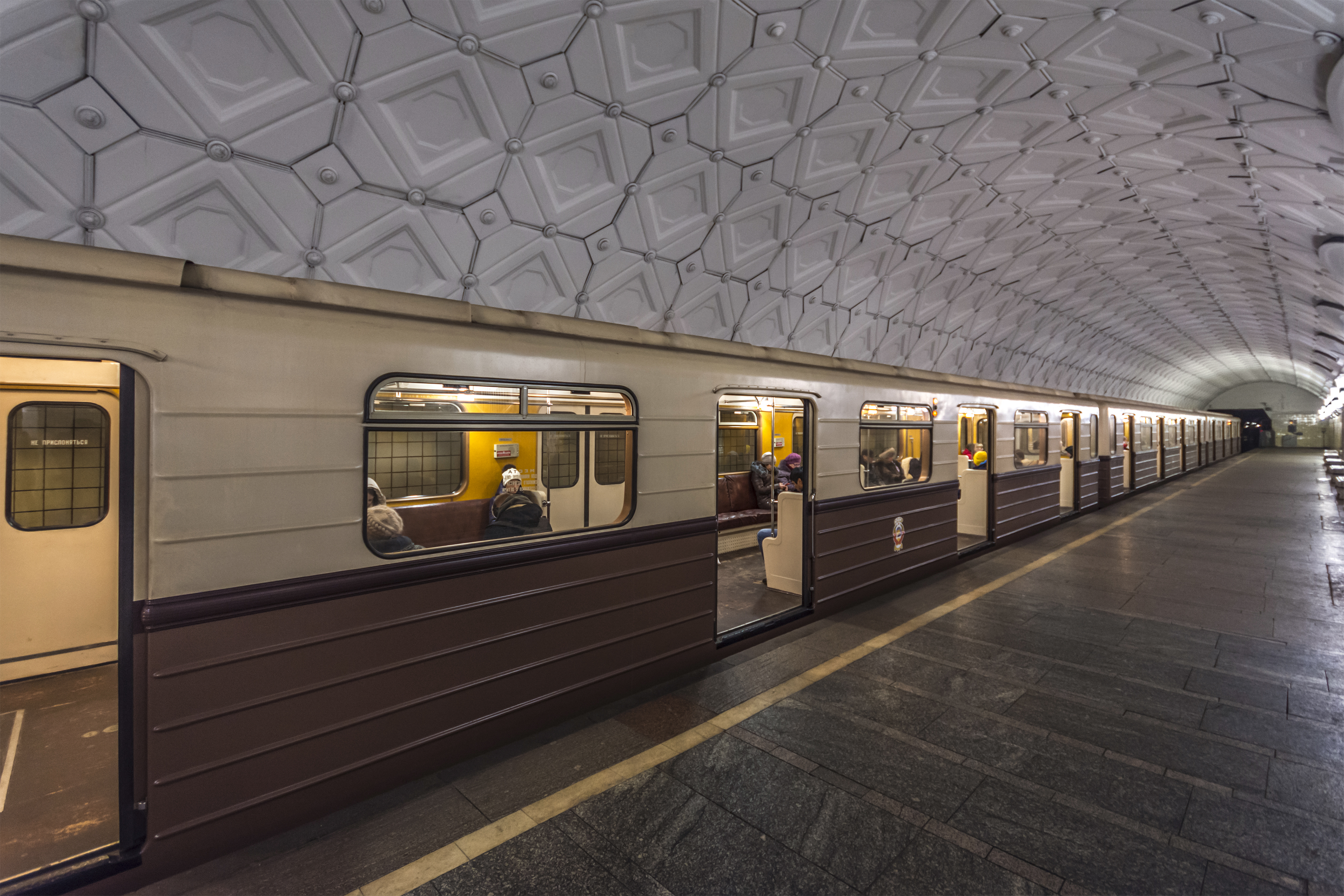
Boarding platform and "retro-train"
