= Leninsky Prospekt (Moscow Metro) =

Moscow Metro station

Leninsky Prospekt Ленинский проспект
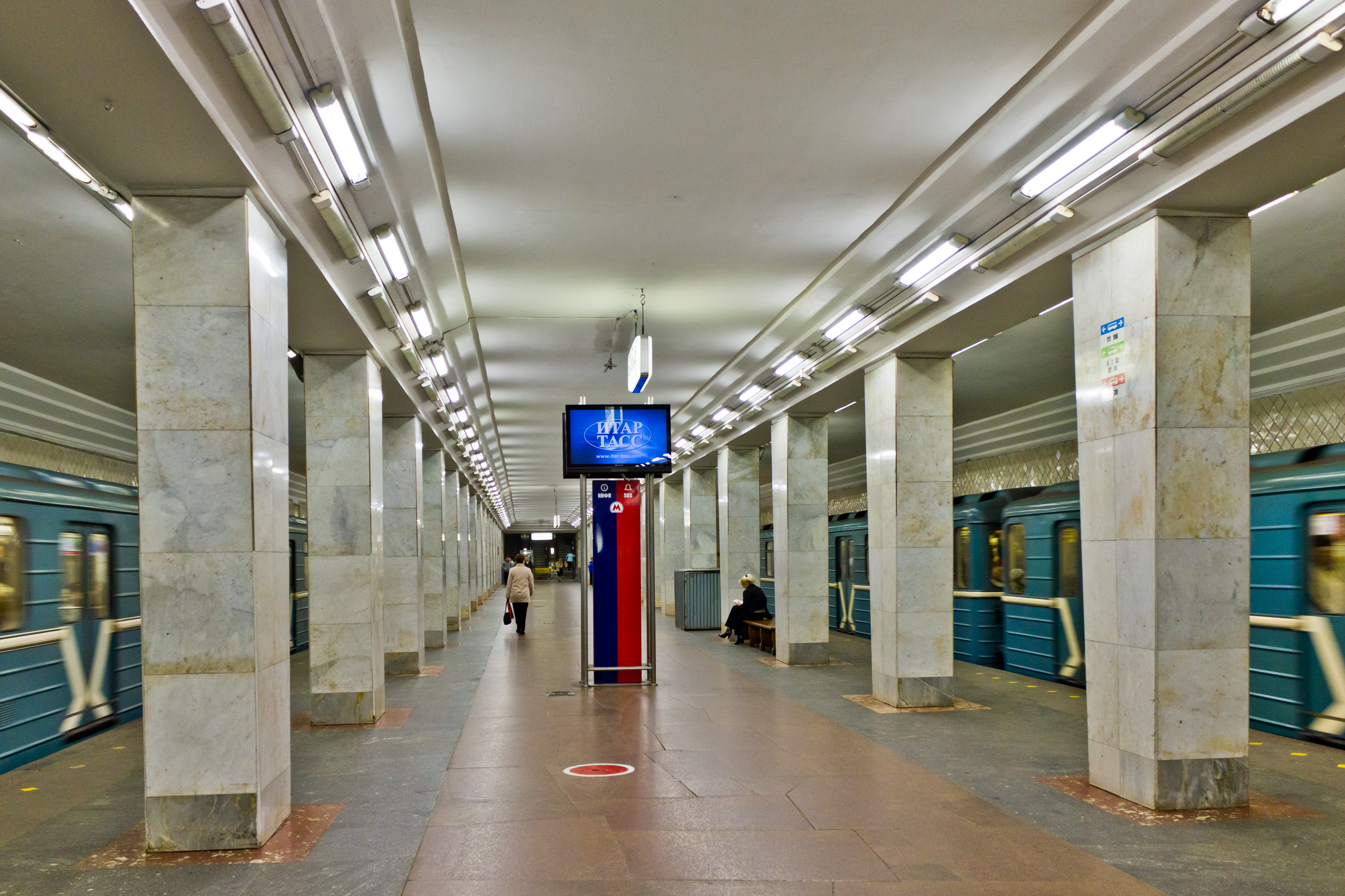

General information
- Location: Gagarinsky District; Donskoy District; South-Western Administrative Okrug; Southern Administrative Okrug; Moscow; Russia
- Coordinates: 55.7077°N 37.5861°E
- System: Moscow Metro station
- Owner: Moskovsky Metropoliten
- Line: Kaluzhsko-Rizhskaya line
- Platforms: 1
- Tracks: 2
- Connections: Bus: 111, 144, 144к, 196, 317, 553, м1 Tram: 14, 39

Construction
- Depth: 16 metres (52 ft)
- Platform levels: 1
- Parking: No

Other information
- Station code: 100

History
- Opened: 13 October 1962; 63 years ago

Passengers
- 2002: 22,484,000

Services
Preceding station	Moscow Metro	Following station
Akademicheskaya towards Novoyasenevskaya	Kaluzhsko-Rizhskaya line	Shabolovskaya towards Medvedkovo
Out-of-station interchange
Krymskaya anticlockwise / outer	Moscow Central Circle transfer at Ploshchad Gagarina	Luzhniki clockwise / inner
Route map
Location
- Location within Moscow Metro

Leninsky Prospekt (Russian: Ленинский проспект English: Lenin Avenue) is a station on the Kaluzhsko-Rizhskaya Line of the Moscow Metro. It was built in 1962 to a variant of the standard column tri-span design, which included a more vaulted central span. The pillars are faced with white marble with a strip of gray at the base and the outer walls are tiled. The original metal light fixtures still run the length of each platform span were replaced in 2004 with more utilitarian fluorescent fixtures. The architects of the station are A. Strelkov, Nina Alexandrovna Aleshin, Yuriy Vdovin, V. Polikarpov and A. Marova.

Leninsky Prospekt has two entrances, interlinked with subways on the east side of the Leninsky Avenue after which it was named and with exists also to both sides of the Yuri Gagarin Square.

Currently the station serves 61,600 passengers daily. In the middle of a platform there is a staircase allowing transfer to Ploschad Gagarina station of the Moscow Central Circle. Since the station was built, and until recently, this staircase was a unique feature of the station, that led nowhere for years. The staircase was intended to be a part of this transfer since inception, but even though passenger service on the Moscow Little Ring Railway was in planning since 1960s, the preparatory works for that only began in the 21st century, and the transfer only opened for passengers on 10 September 2016, more than 50 years later.

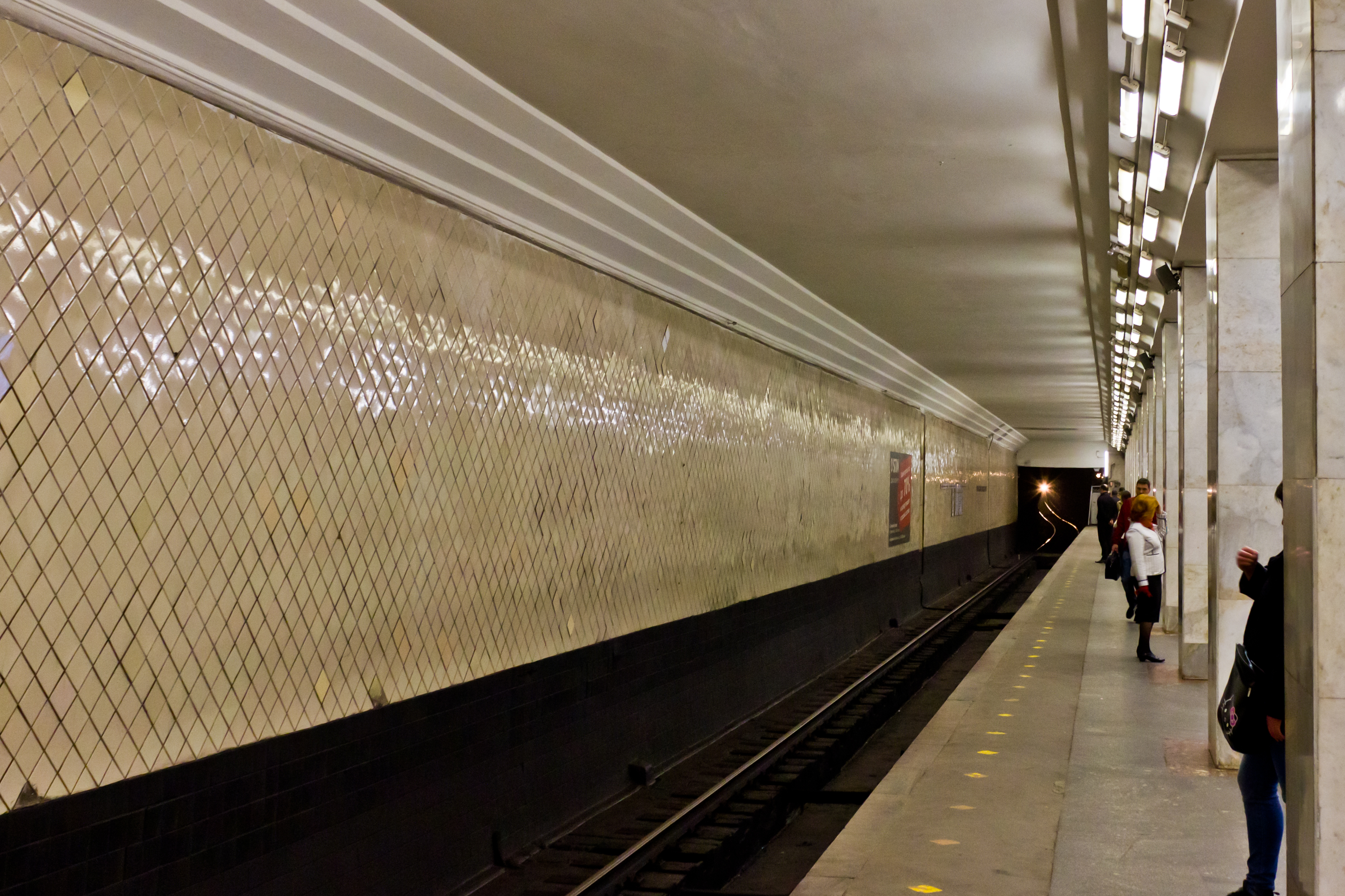
Station platform of Leninsky Prospekt
