= Sergey Kapkov (politician) =

Russian politician (born 1975)

Sergei Kapkov
- Сергей Капков
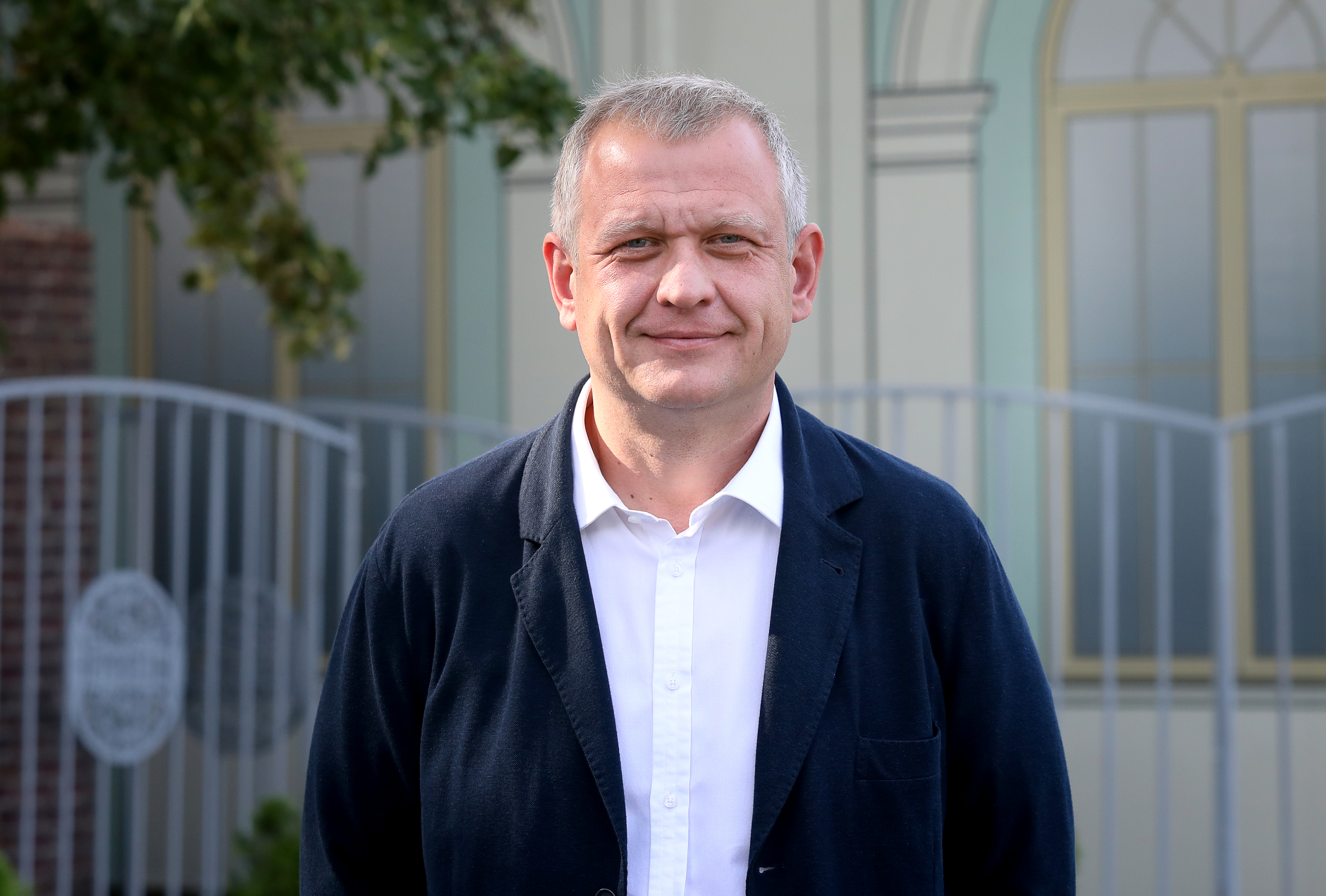
- Kapkov in September 2018

Member of the State Duma
- In office 2003 – March 2011

Personal details
- Born: 10 December 1975 (age 50) Gorky, Russian SFSR, Soviet Union (now Nizhny Novgorod, Russia)
- Party: United Russia
- Sergei Kapkov's voice From the Echo of Moscow program, recorded on 24 June 2013

Sergei Alexandrovich Kapkov (Russian: Сергей Александрович Капков; born 10 December 1975) is a Russian politician, head of the Culture and Urban Development Center, School of Economics, Moscow State University.

Former minister of Moscow government, head of Moscow City Department of Culture (30 September 2011 – 10 March 2015), head of the National Academy of Football Fund, highly supported by Roman Abramovich. The Fund under Kapkov leadership was the one who hired Guus Hiddink as the chief coach of the Russian national team.

== Biography ==
Kapkov was born in Gorkiy (modern name Nizhny Novgorod) in 1975.

He graduated from Volga-Vyatka Academy of State Service (from 2010 became a subdivision of Russian Presidential Academy of National Economy and Public Administration) in 1998 with a bachelor's degree in state and regional management. After that, he spent three years (from 1998 to 2001) studying social philosophy at Volga-Vyatka Academy of State Service.

In his student years, Kapkov combined university study with work for election campaigns in the region. From 1994 to 1998, he worked as a deputy's assistant of the Legislative Assembly of Nizhny Novgorod region. Many newspapers described him as a talented political strategist: it was reported that he was involved in the activities of election headquarters of "a number of candidates for governor", including Boris Nemtsov (in the elections of the Nizhny Novgorod Region Administration won in December 1995). In addition, he participated in the political movement "Our Home – Russia" in the elections to the state Duma of the second convocation (1995). In 1998, he led the election campaign of Alexander Sharonov, the candidate for deputy of the Nizhny Novgorod Region Legislative Assembly.

== Career goals ==
=== Work in Chukotka region ===
Kapkov met Roman Abramovich, one of the main shareholder of Sibneft that time. In 1999, Kapkov took part in Abramovich's election campaign to the State Duma. Kapkov became a primary assistant of Abramovich in the Duma. News media describe Kapkov as "one of the leading managers in charge of media relations and public outreach".

In 2000, he became the head of governor election campaign in the Chukotka region for Abramovich, who won the election with more than 90% of electoral votes.

In 2001, Kapkov became the head of public relations and digital media department at Chukotka region. The same year, he took over the department of culture, sport, tourism and young population policy and became one of the youngest ministers at Chukotka region. He stood behind couple modernization in the region, such as first regional radio (radio "Purga" – "Snowstorm") and first independent TV-channel "Belyi Veter" (White Wind).

=== Duma member ===
In 2003, Kapkov was elected as a deputy in the lower house State Duma. He was a member of the lower house committee for civil, criminal, arbitration and procedural legislation. In 2007, Kapkov took another turn in the state Duma when Vladimir Putin declined his invitation to become a deputy in Russia's new parliament and handed over his seat to Kapkov, who became deputy head of the State Duma Committee for Information Policy, Technology and Communication.

=== Head of Gorky Park ===
In 2011, Kapkov stepped down from the position of the state Duma deputy to start magic renovation and revival of Central Moscow park – Gorky Park. Within months, the park was free of old, dated amusement attractions and old-style cafés. Instead of these park visitors and city guests received sensitive customer-service approach trendy outdoor activities and fully renovated park with a waterfront.

=== Work in Moscow city Culture Department ===
What I was doing, I regarded as a priority for the people of Moscow and the foundation for personal freedoms, personal space and the urban environment".

Kapkov was the force behind the transformation and revival of Moscow's culture. As Moscow's minister of culture (2011–2015), he undertook major urban regeneration initiatives and introduced radically new cultural policies. Under his watch, many public spaces, parks, and riverside areas were revitalized, and new pedestrian zones, street fairs, exhibitions, and music and arts festivals were created.

Following Kapkov's reforms and efforts, regional administrations across the country have become increasingly interested in renovating parks and revitalising public spaces. In Moscow, many of the changes to the city's urban environment are difficult to reverse, regardless of what happens. Although many people are concerned about possible changes, hope remains. Some suggest that if the Europeanisation of Moscow has come to an end, the end of this imitative approach to urban development may not necessarily be a bad thing.

== Soccer/football influence ==
In June 2004, he became chief of the board of directors at National Football Academy. The main purpose of this organization was improving infrastructure and setting up new training centers for talented players at a national level. The annual budget of the fund was almost $30 million.

== Awards ==
- GQ magazine 2011 award "Discovery of the Year" – for frantic activity as director of Gorky Park.
- By President executive order, Kapkov was granted a medal "for national population census"
