= Luzhniki Olympic Complex =

Multifunctional sports complex in Moscow, Russia

Coordinates: 55°42′57″N 37°33′13″E

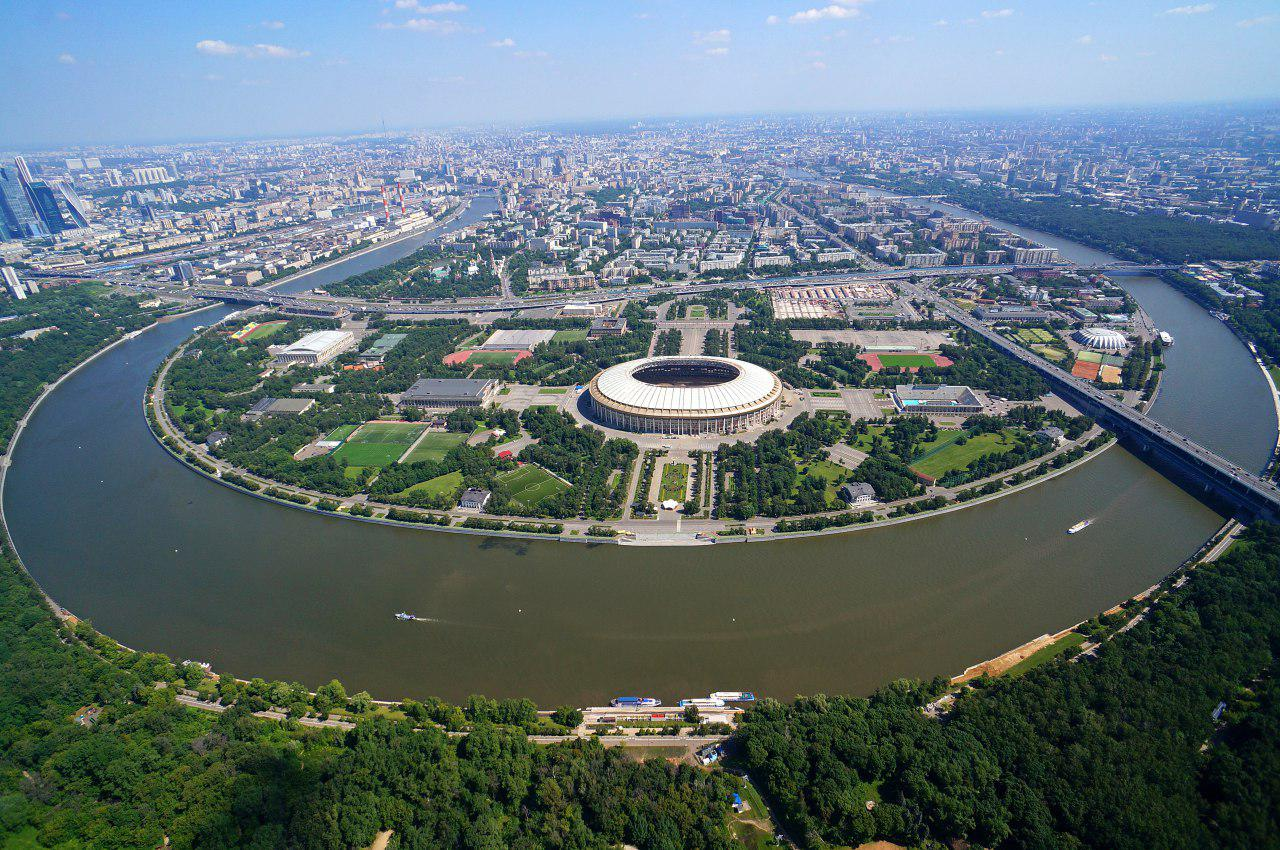
The complex

The Luzhniki Olympic Complex (Russian: Олимпийский комплекс «Лужники») is one of the biggest multifunctional sports complexes of the world. Built in 1955 and 1956, it is located in the Khamovniki district of Moscow, Russia. Formerly known as the Central Lenin Complex, it served as the Olympic Park for the 1980 Summer Olympics.

The complex can be reached by the Moscow Metro train, when leaving either Sportivnaya, Vorobyovy Gory or Luzhniki.

== Venues ==
- Grand Sports Arena (Luzhniki Stadium)
- Luzhniki Palace of Sports
- Luzhniki Small Sports Arena
- Olympic Pool
- Druzhba Multipurpose Arena
- Irina Viner-Usmanova Gymnastics Palace
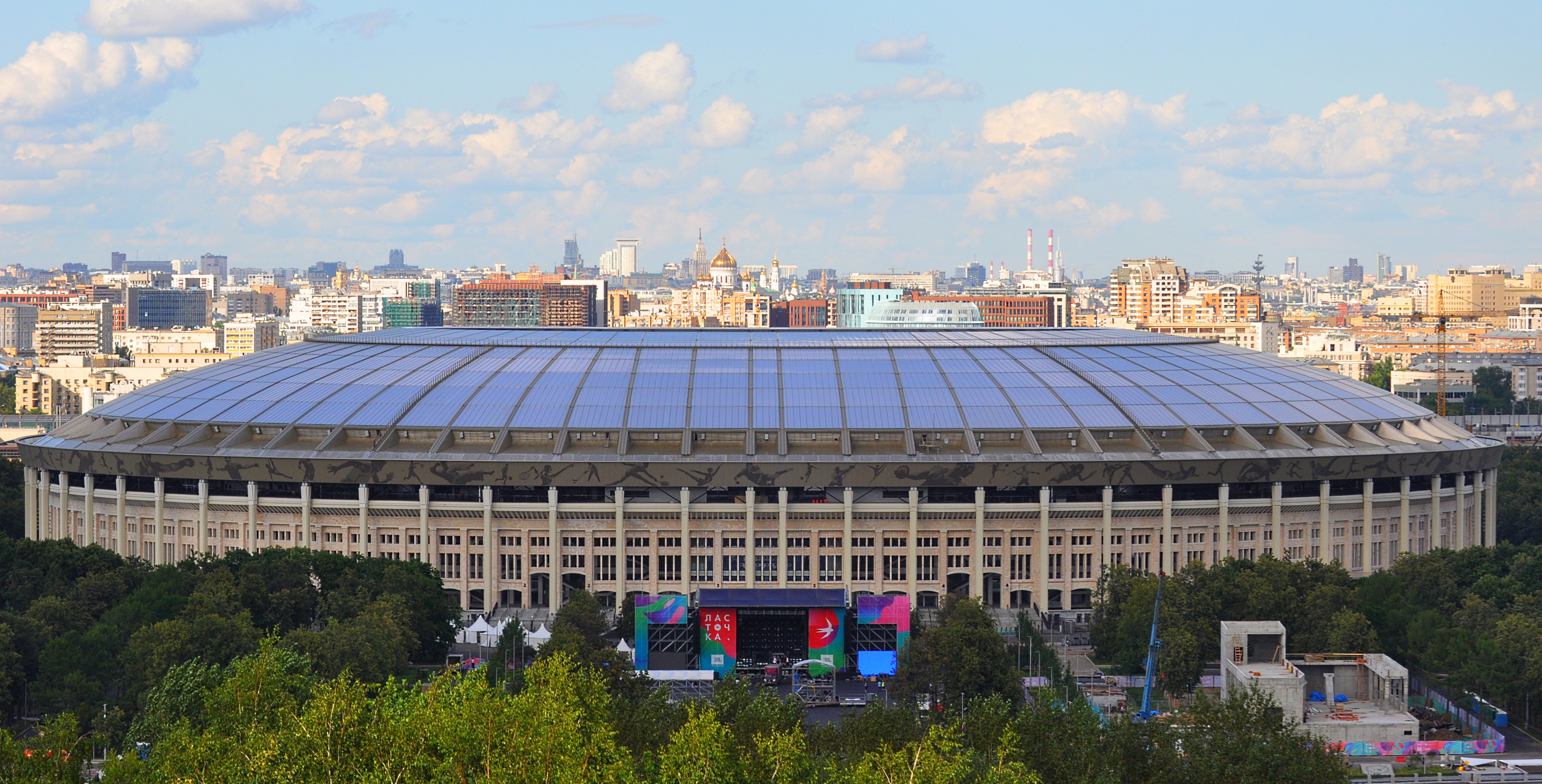
Grand Sports Arena

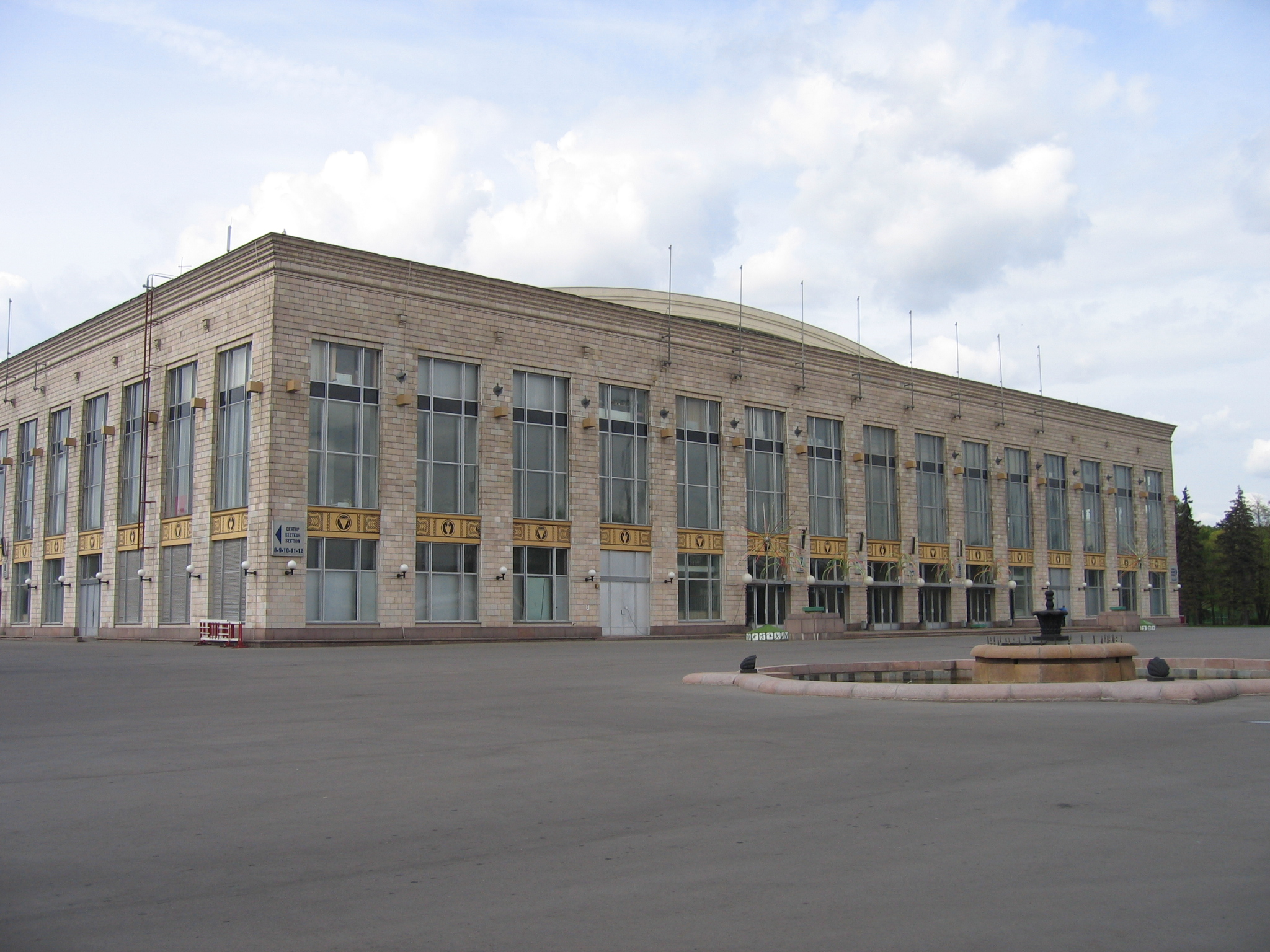
Luzhniki Palace of Sports

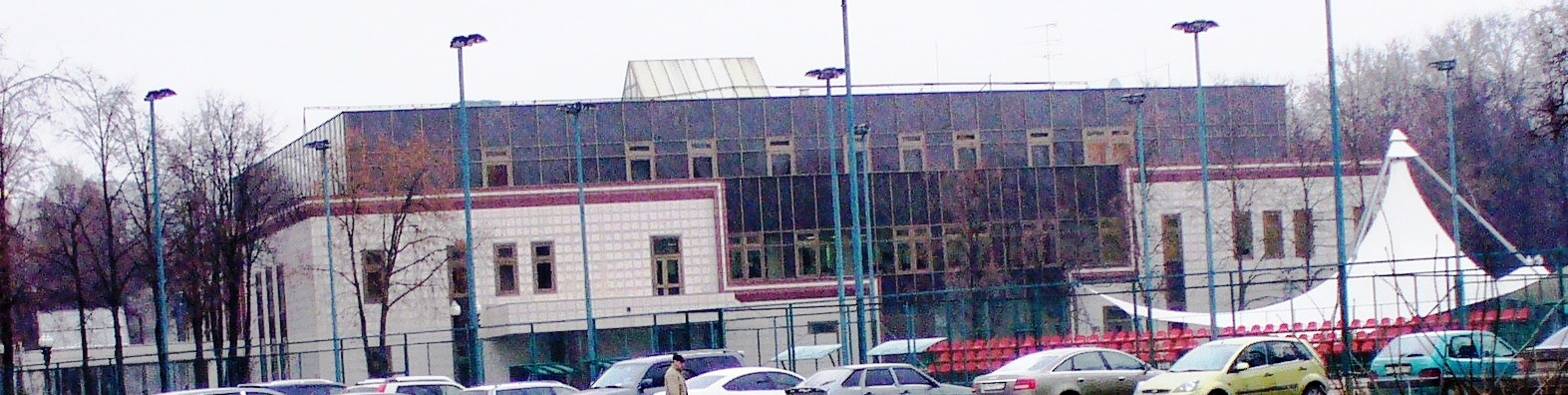
Multisport Arena

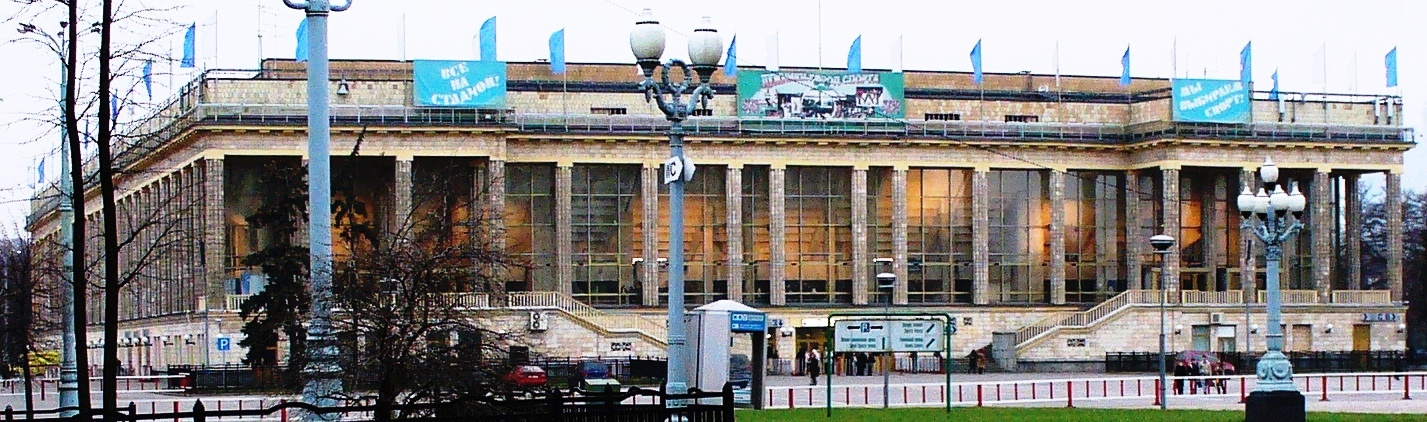
Luzhniki Small Sports Arena

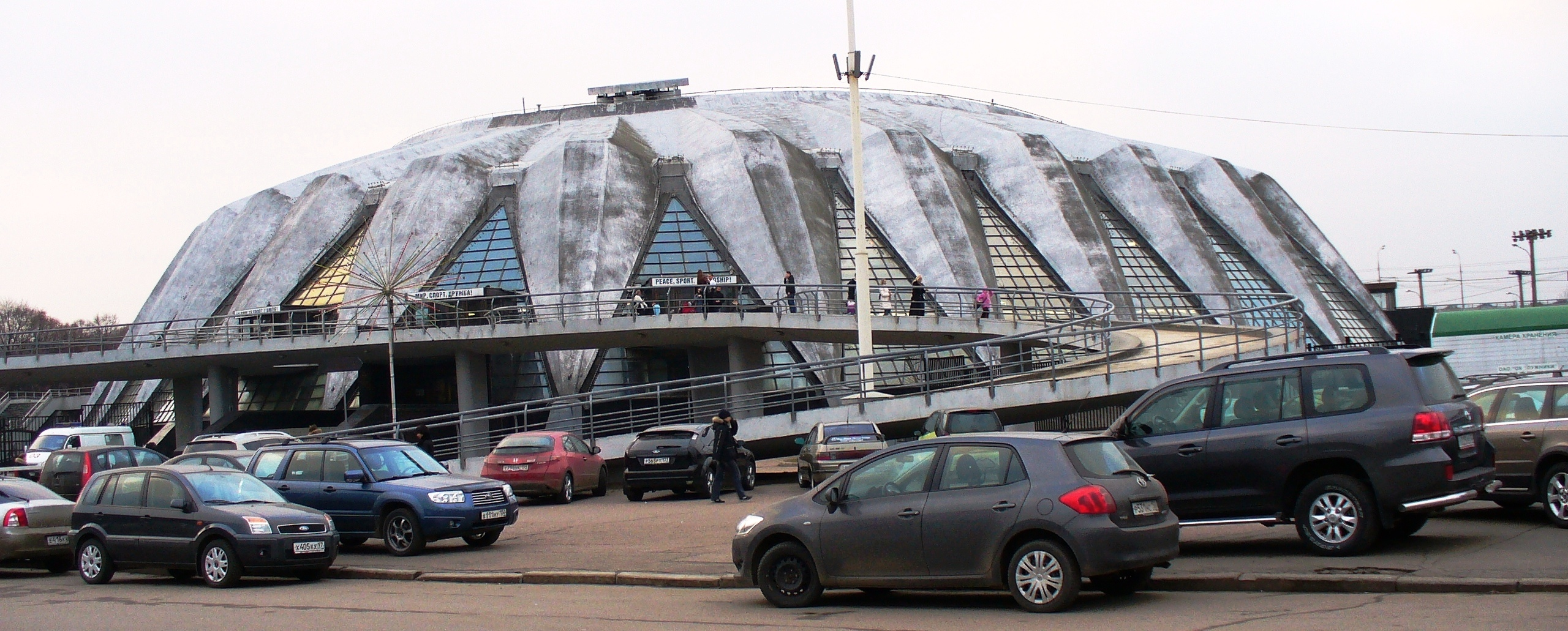
Druzhba Multipurpose Arena

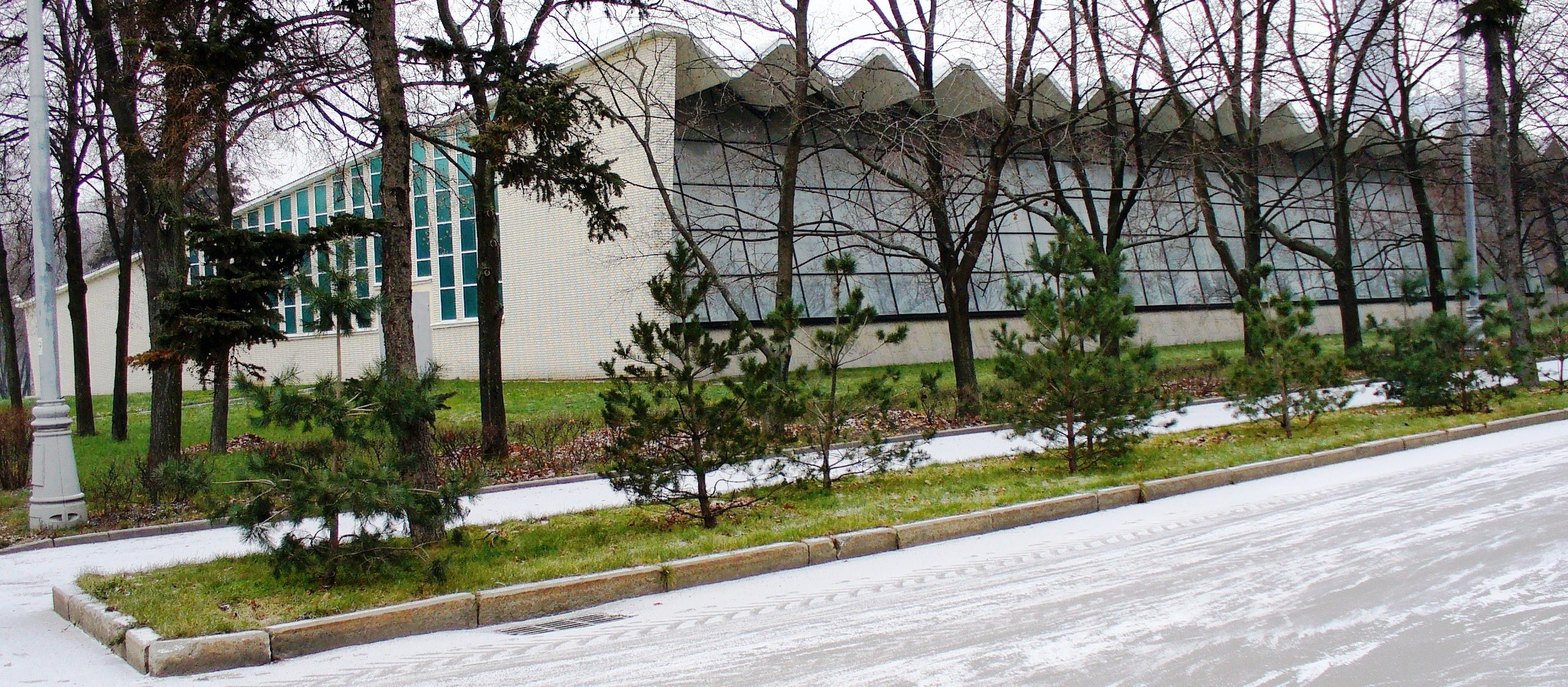
Crystal skating rink

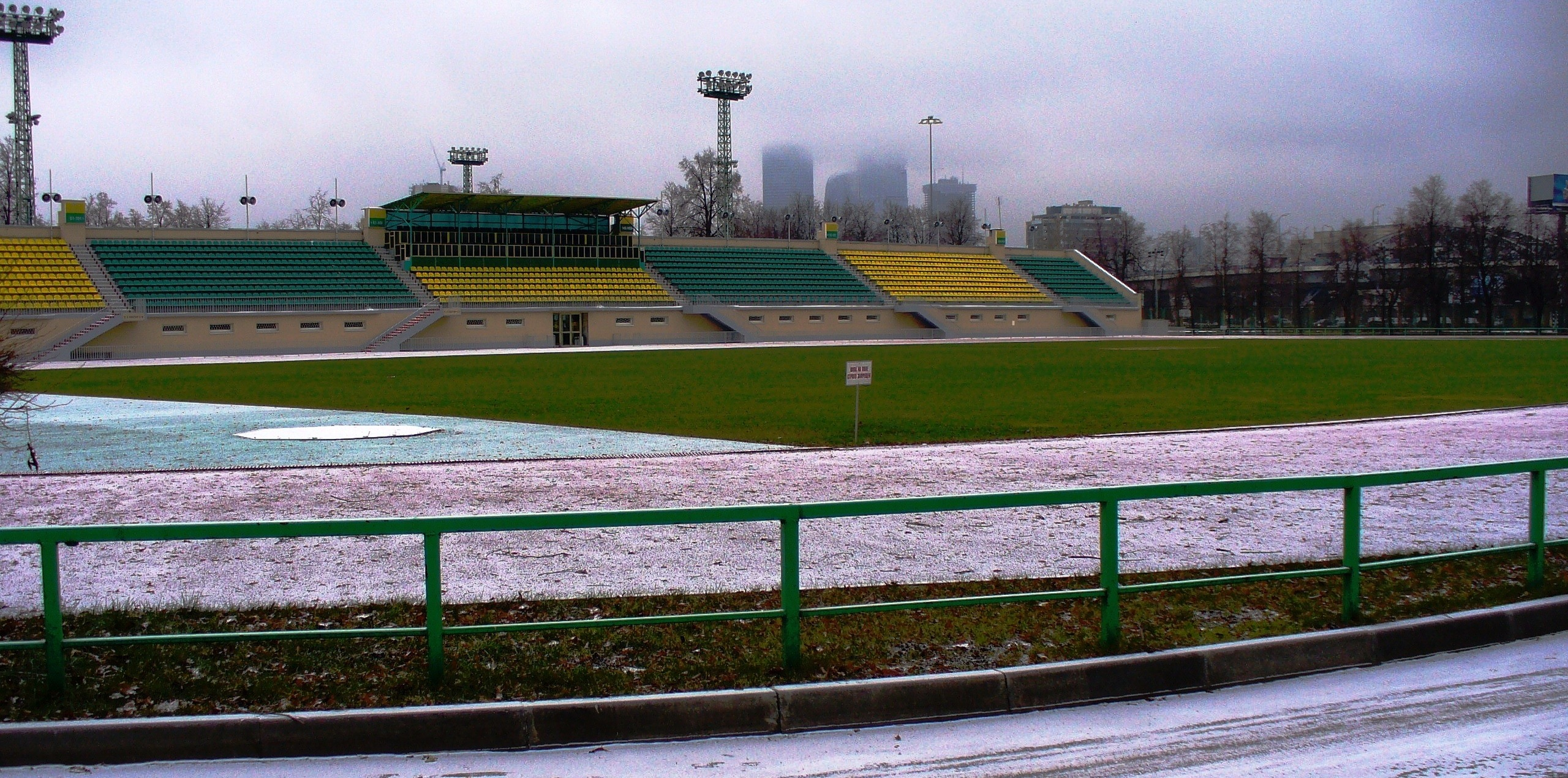
Sports facilities

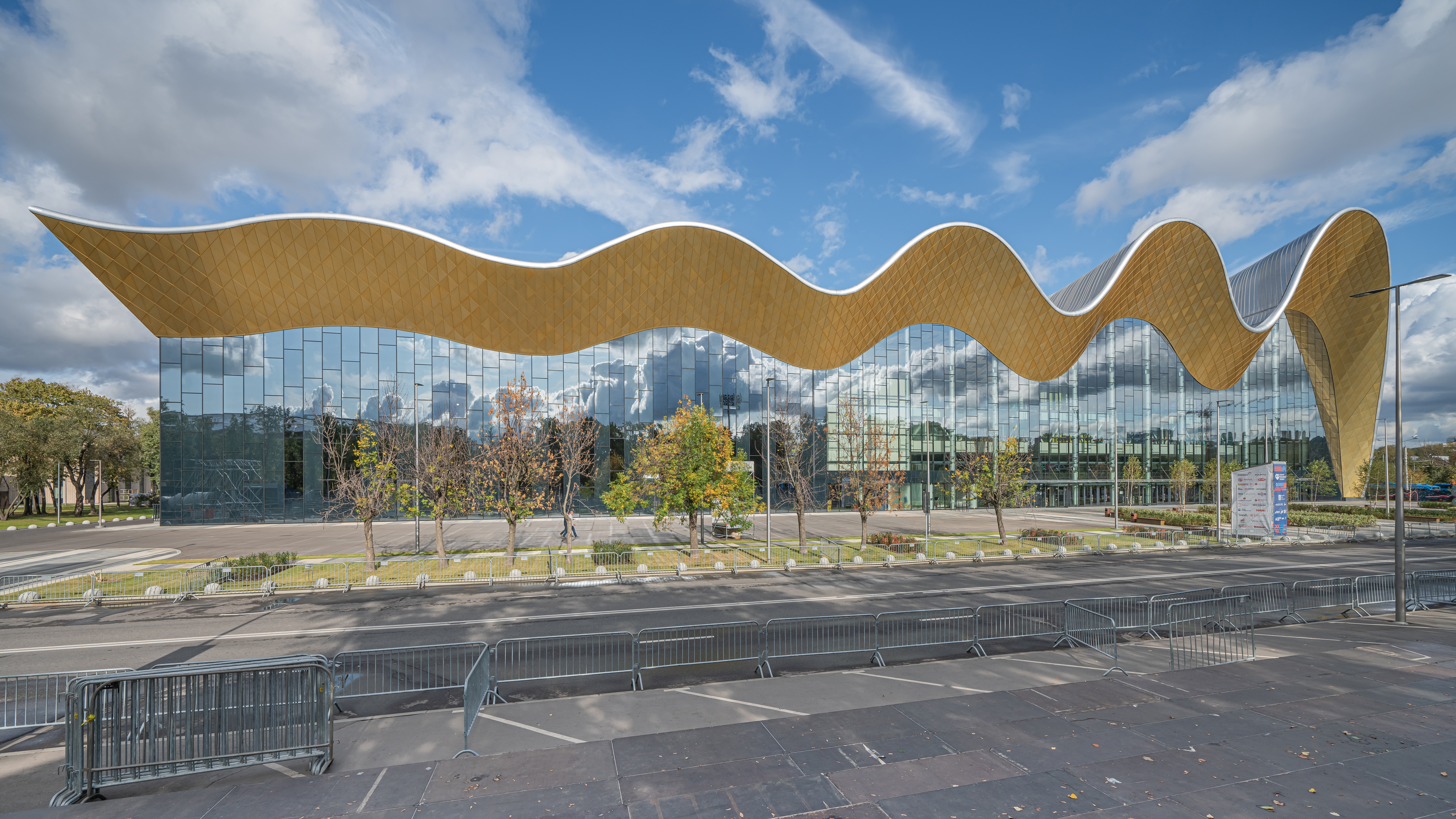
Irina Viner-Usmanova Gymnastics Palace
