= Shabolovskaya (Moscow Metro) =

Moscow Metro station

Shabolovskaya Шаболовская
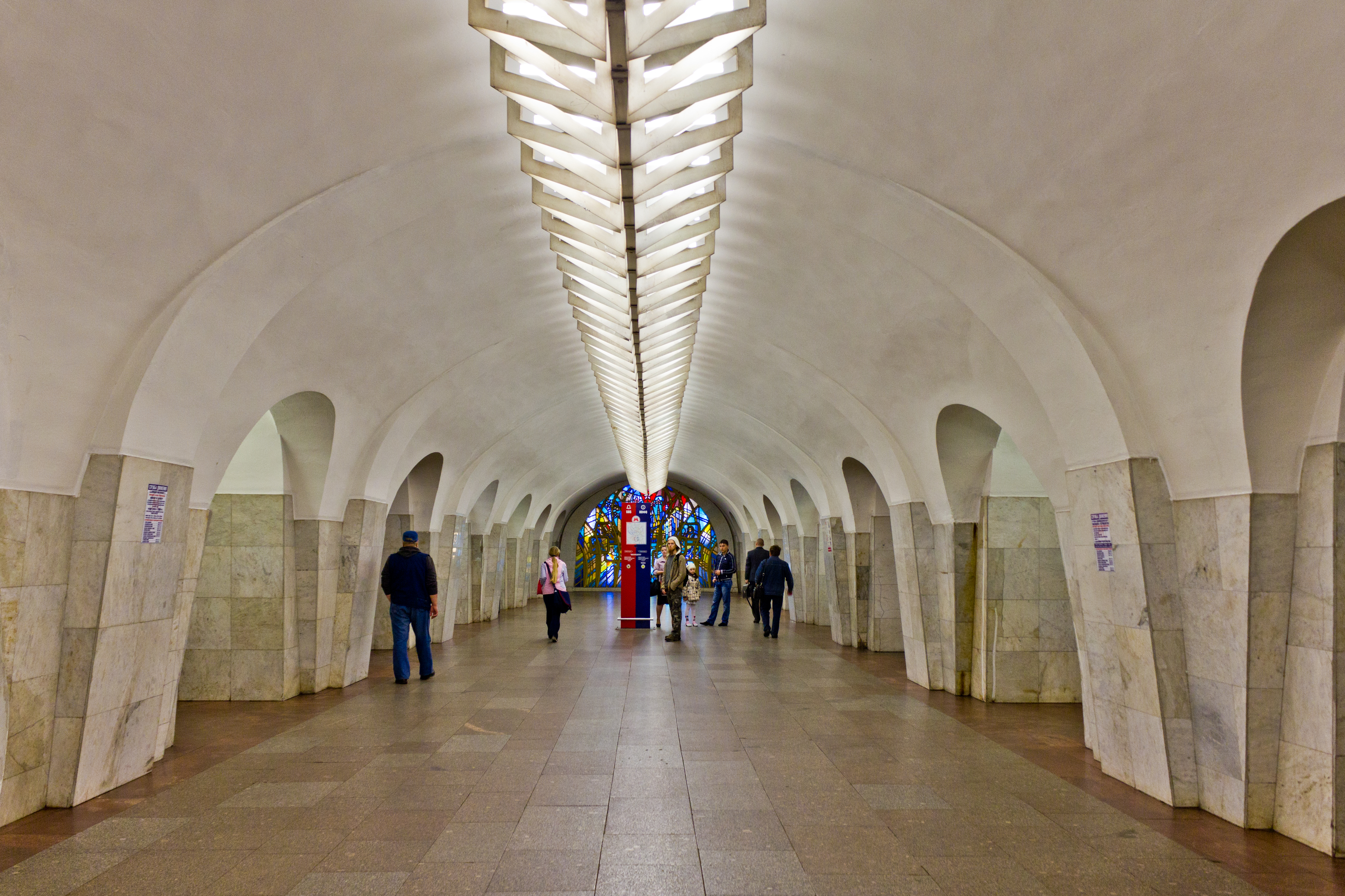

General information
- Location: Donskoy District; Southern Administrative Okrug; Moscow; Russia
- Coordinates: 55.7198°N 37.6083°E
- System: Moscow Metro station
- Owner: Moskovsky Metropoliten
- Line: Kaluzhsko-Rizhskaya line
- Platforms: 1
- Tracks: 2
- Connections: Tram: A, 14, 26, 47

Construction
- Depth: 46.5 metres (153 ft)
- Platform levels: 1
- Parking: No

Other information
- Station code: 099

History
- Opened: 6 November 1980; 45 years ago

Passengers
- 2002: 17,228,000

Services
Preceding station	Moscow Metro	Following station
Leninsky Prospekt towards Novoyasenevskaya	Kaluzhsko-Rizhskaya line	Oktyabrskaya towards Medvedkovo
Route map
Location
- Location within Moscow Metro

Shabolovskaya (Russian: Шаболовская, also known as Шаболовка (English: Shabolovka street)) is a station on the Kaluzhsko-Rizhskaya Line of the Moscow Metro. Though the station itself was built along with the rest of the Kaluzhskaya Line in 1962, problems with the escalator shaft postponed its opening until November 6, 1980. During the 18 intervening years the appearance of the platform was modernized, so it does not appear similar to the other 1960s stations on the line.

Shabolovskaya has pylons punctuated on all four faces by projecting piers and faced with white marble. The piers on the transverse faces of the pylons extend upward into the vaulted ceiling. The outer walls are clad in incongruously dark corrugated metal, which contrasts sharply with the bright white of the ceiling and pylons. At the end of the platform is a backlit stained glass panel on the theme of radio and television broadcasting. The station was designed by I.G. Petukhova, V.P. Kachurinets, N.I. Demchinsky, and Yu.A. Kolesnikova.

Shabolovskaya's entrance vestibule is on Shabolovka street south of the intersection with Academicial Petrovsky street.

There are future plans to construct a transfer station with the same name to the Rublyovo-Arkhangelskaya and Biryulyovskaya lines when they fusion together.

== Image and video gallery ==

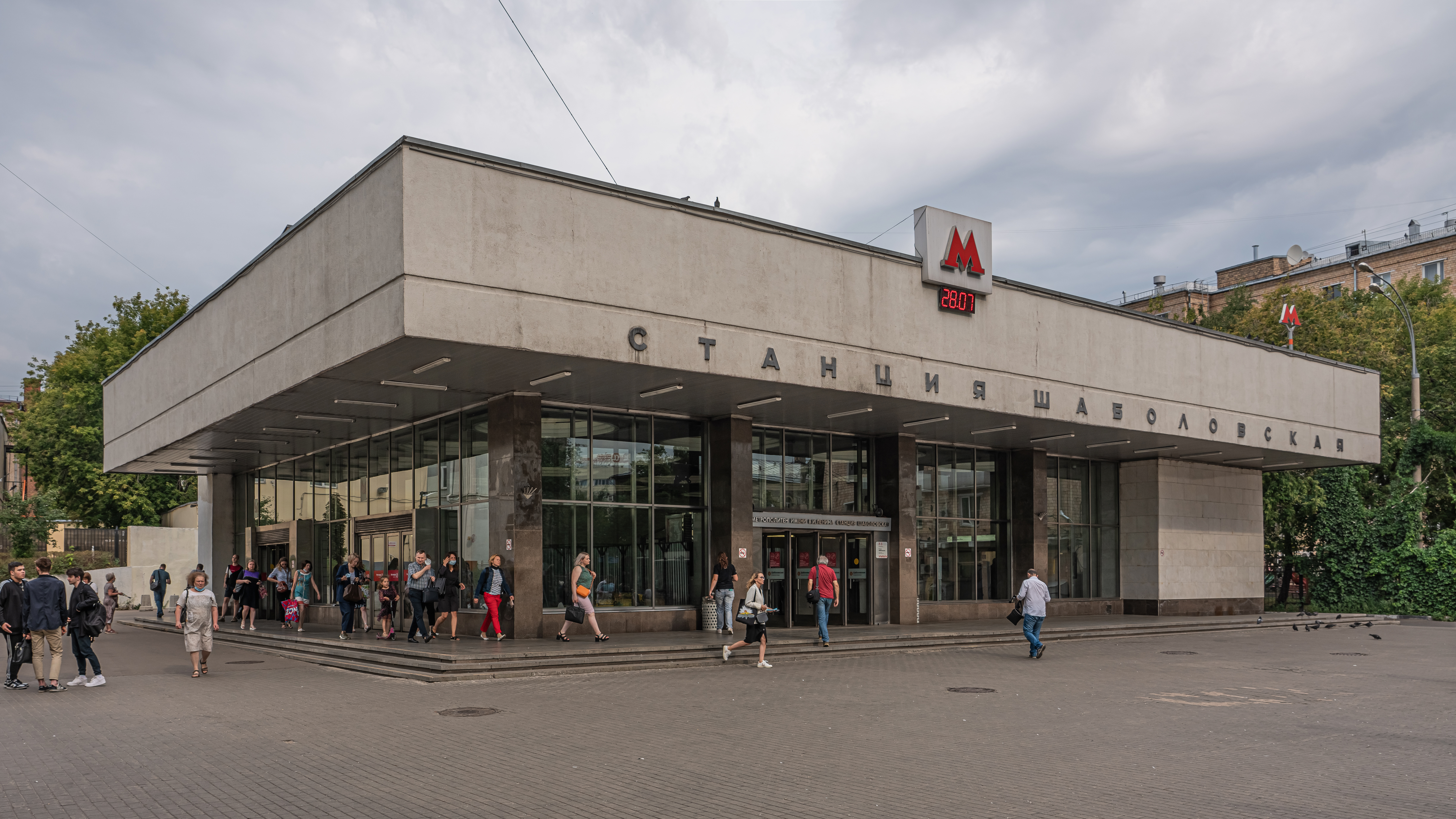
Vestibule

Video of 81-717/714 arriving

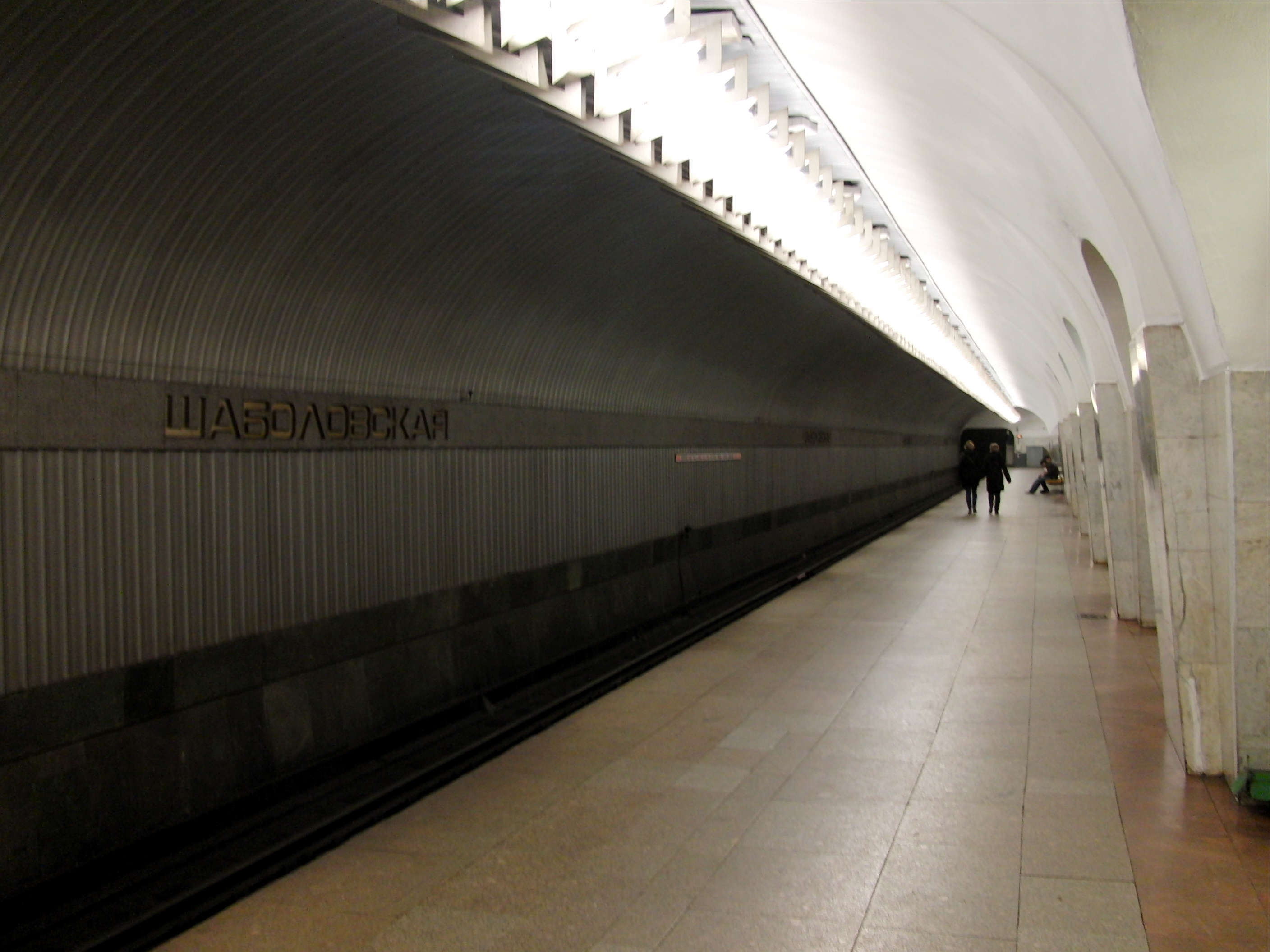
Station platform
