= Luzhniki (Moscow Central Circle) =

Station on the Moscow Central Circle

Luzhniki Лужники
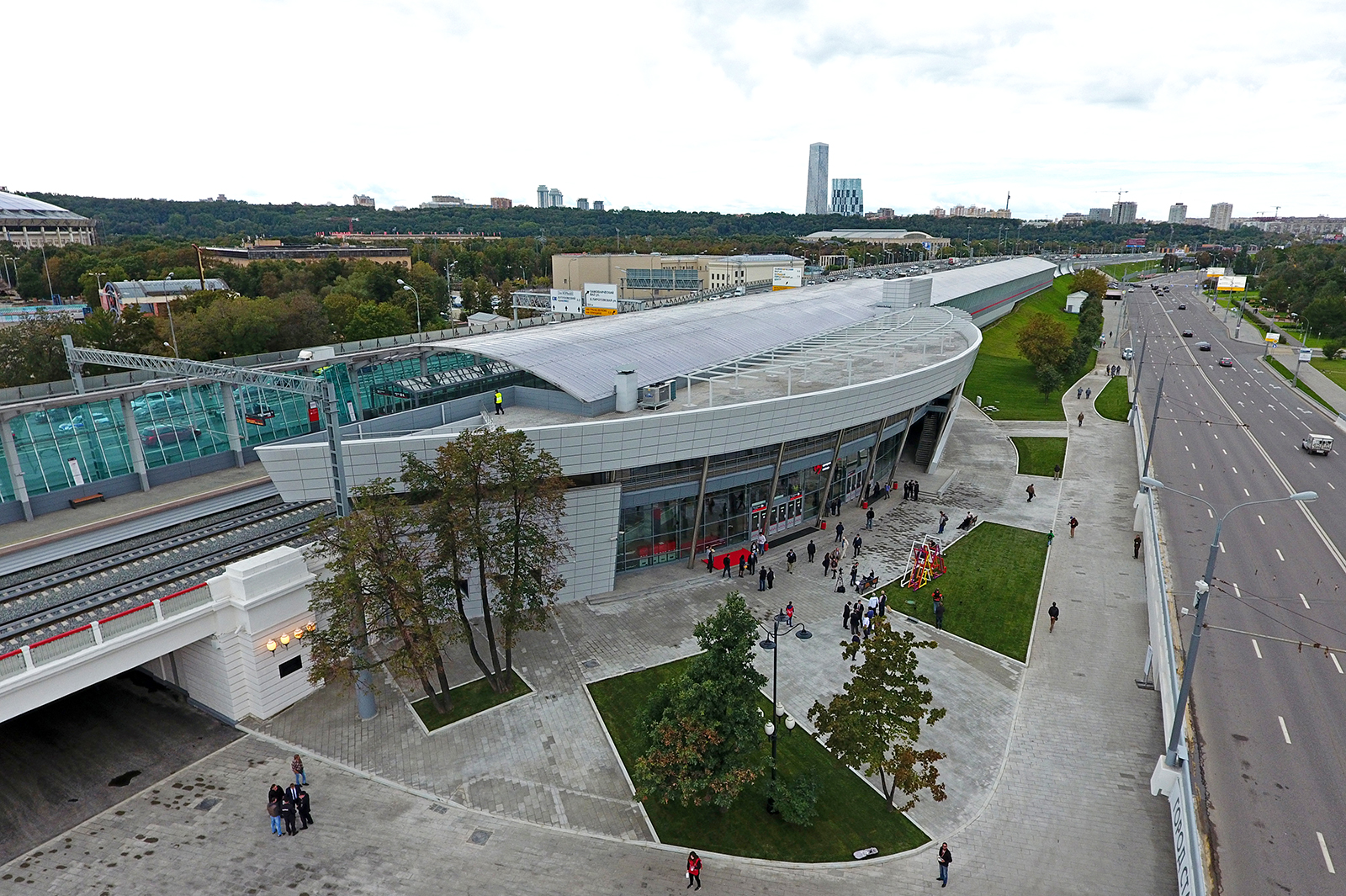

General information
- Coordinates: 55.7210°N 37.5605°E
- System: Moscow Metro
- Line: Moscow Central Circle
- Platforms: 2 side platforms
- Tracks: 2

History
- Opened: 10 September 2016; 9 years ago

Services
Preceding station	Moscow Metro	Following station
Ploshchad Gagarina anticlockwise / outer	Moscow Central Circle	Kutuzovskaya clockwise / inner
Out-of-station interchange
Vorobyovy Gory towards Potapovo	Sokolnicheskaya line transfer at Sportivnaya	Frunzenskaya towards Bulvar Rokossovskogo
Route map
Location
- Location within Moscow Metro

Luzhniki (Russian: Лужники) is a station on the Moscow Central Circle of the Moscow Metro that opened in September 2016.

== Name ==
It is named for the nearby Luzhniki Olympic Complex.

== Transfer ==
Passengers may make out-of-station transfers to Sportivnaya station on the Sokolnicheskaya Line, across Khamovnichesky Val.

== Gallery ==
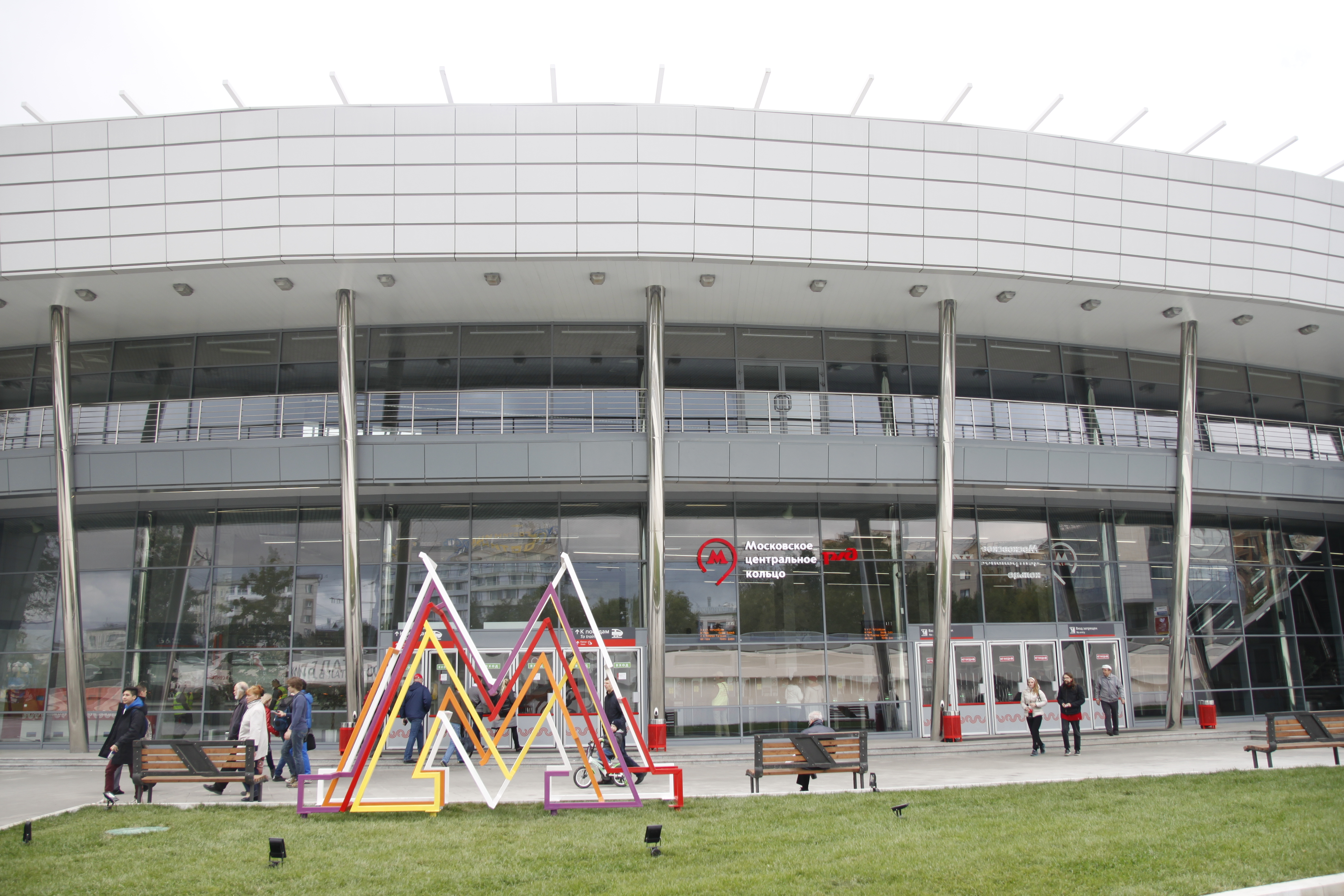

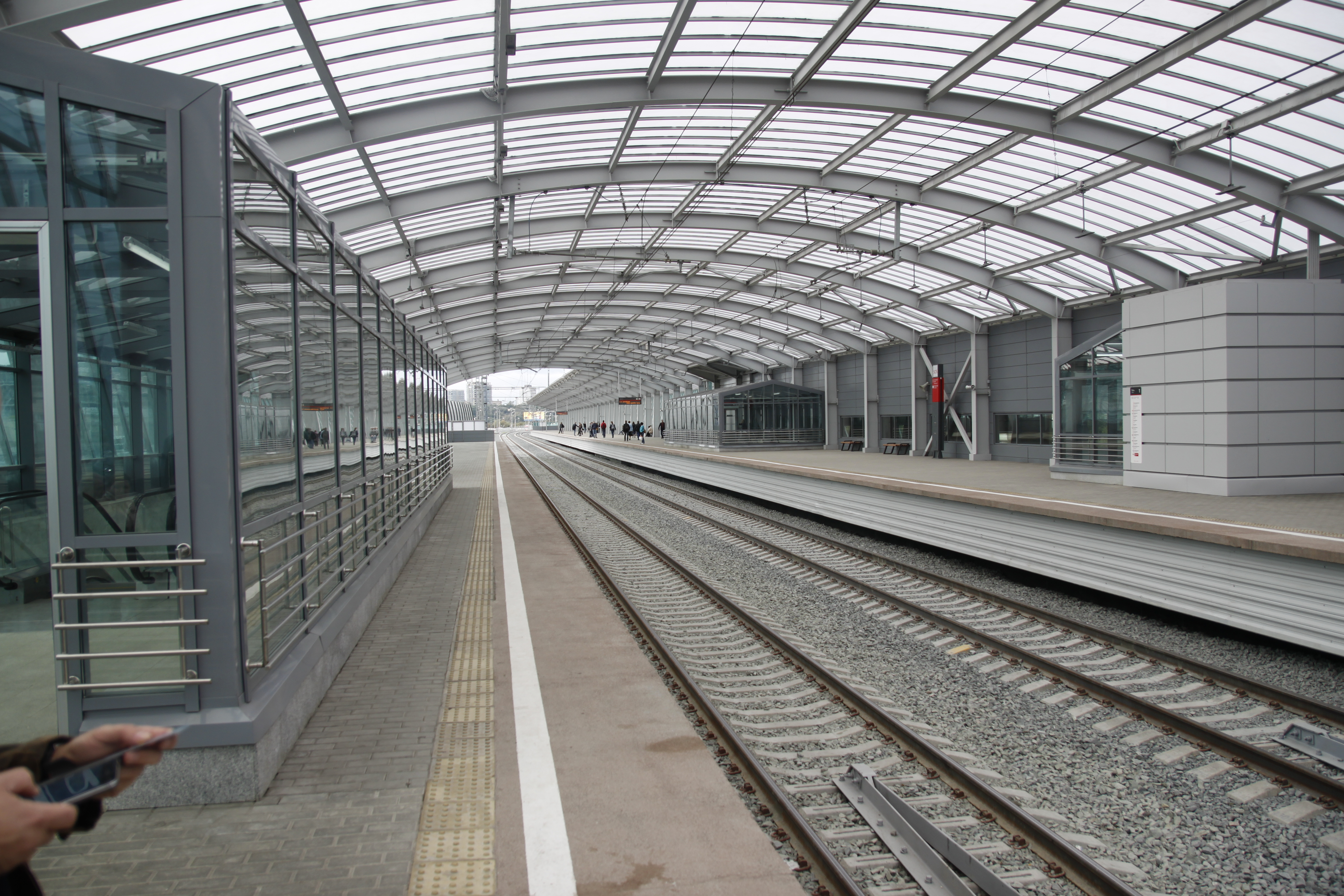

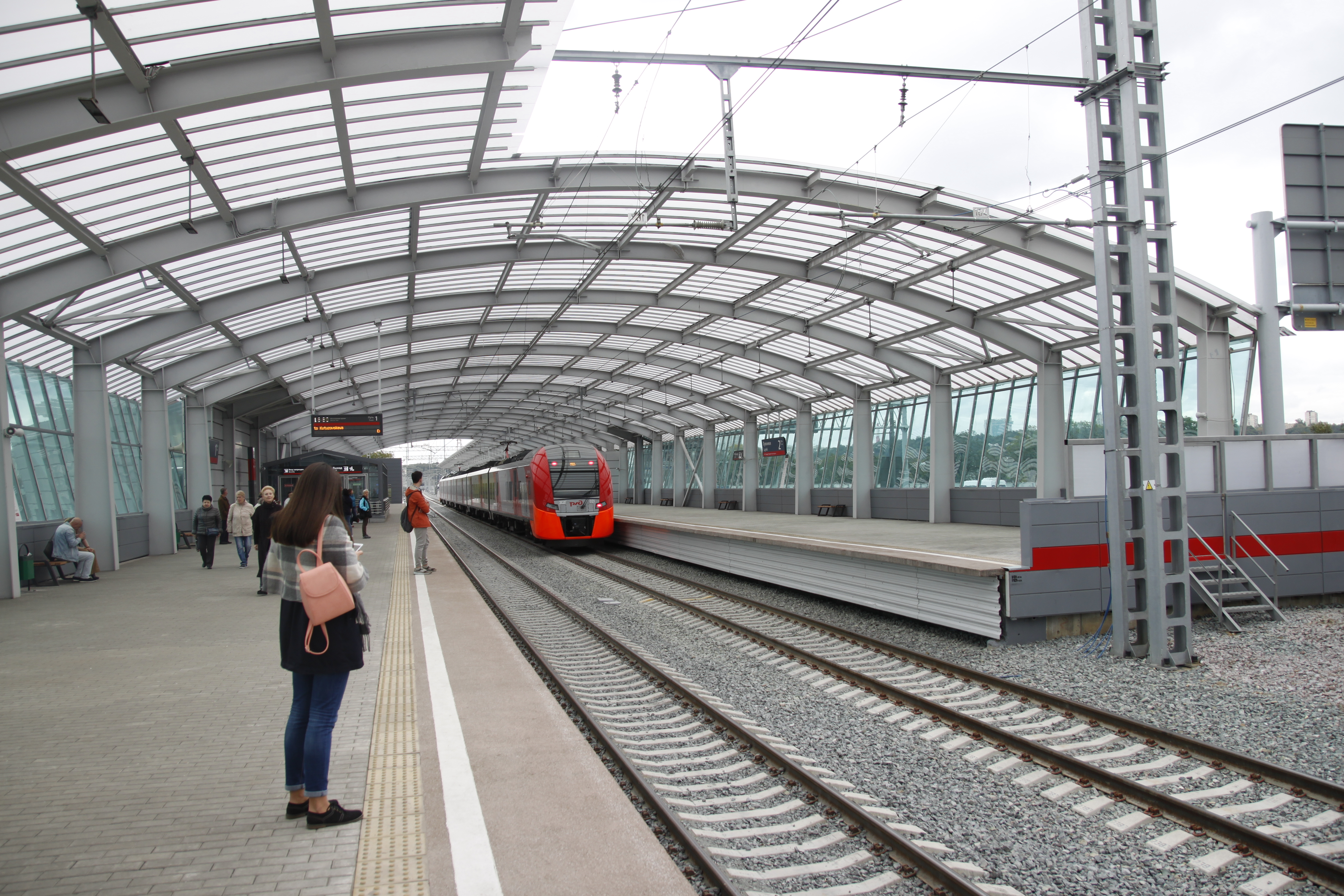

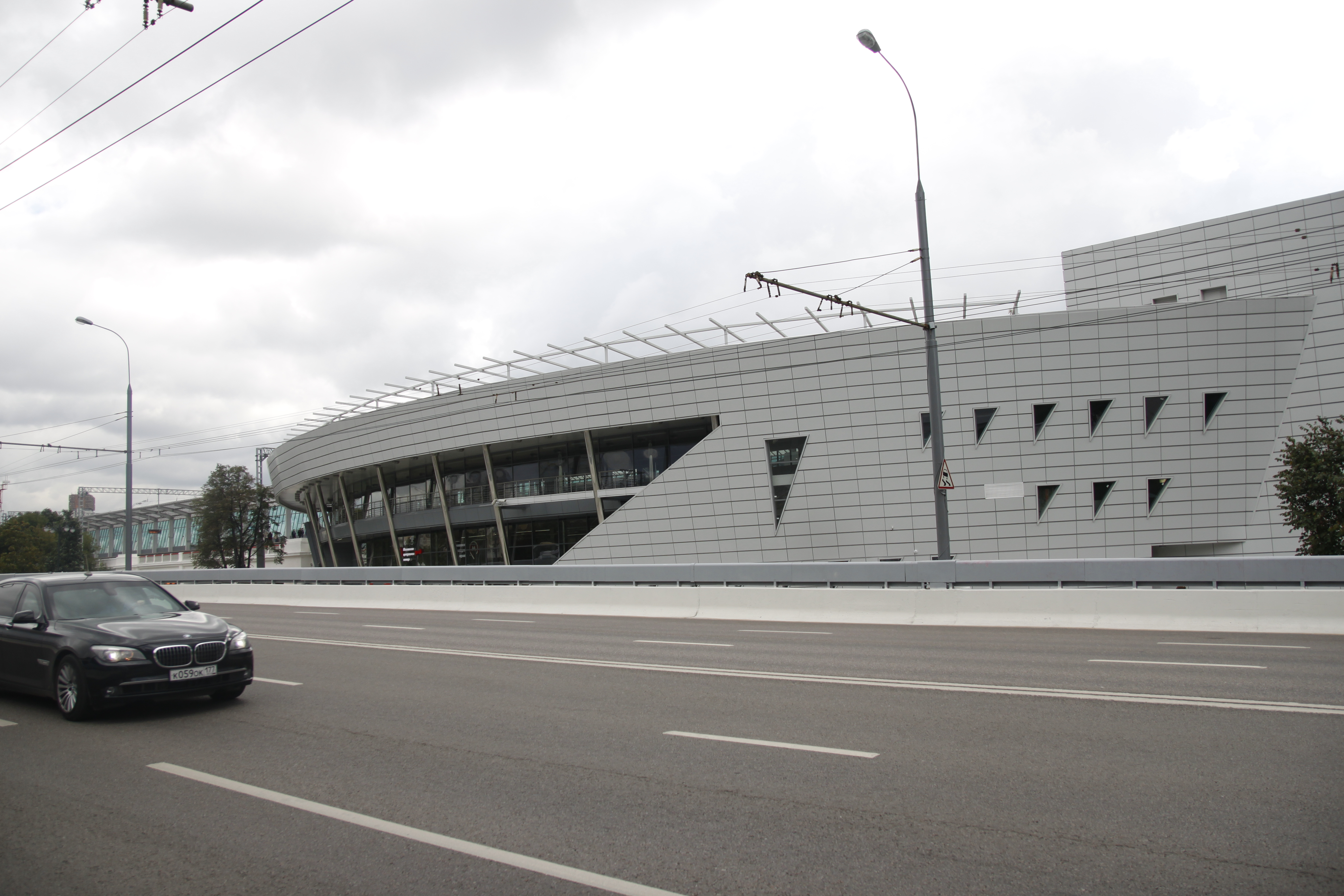
