= Ploshchad Gagarina =

Station on the Moscow Central Circle

Ploshchad Gagarina Площадь Гагарина
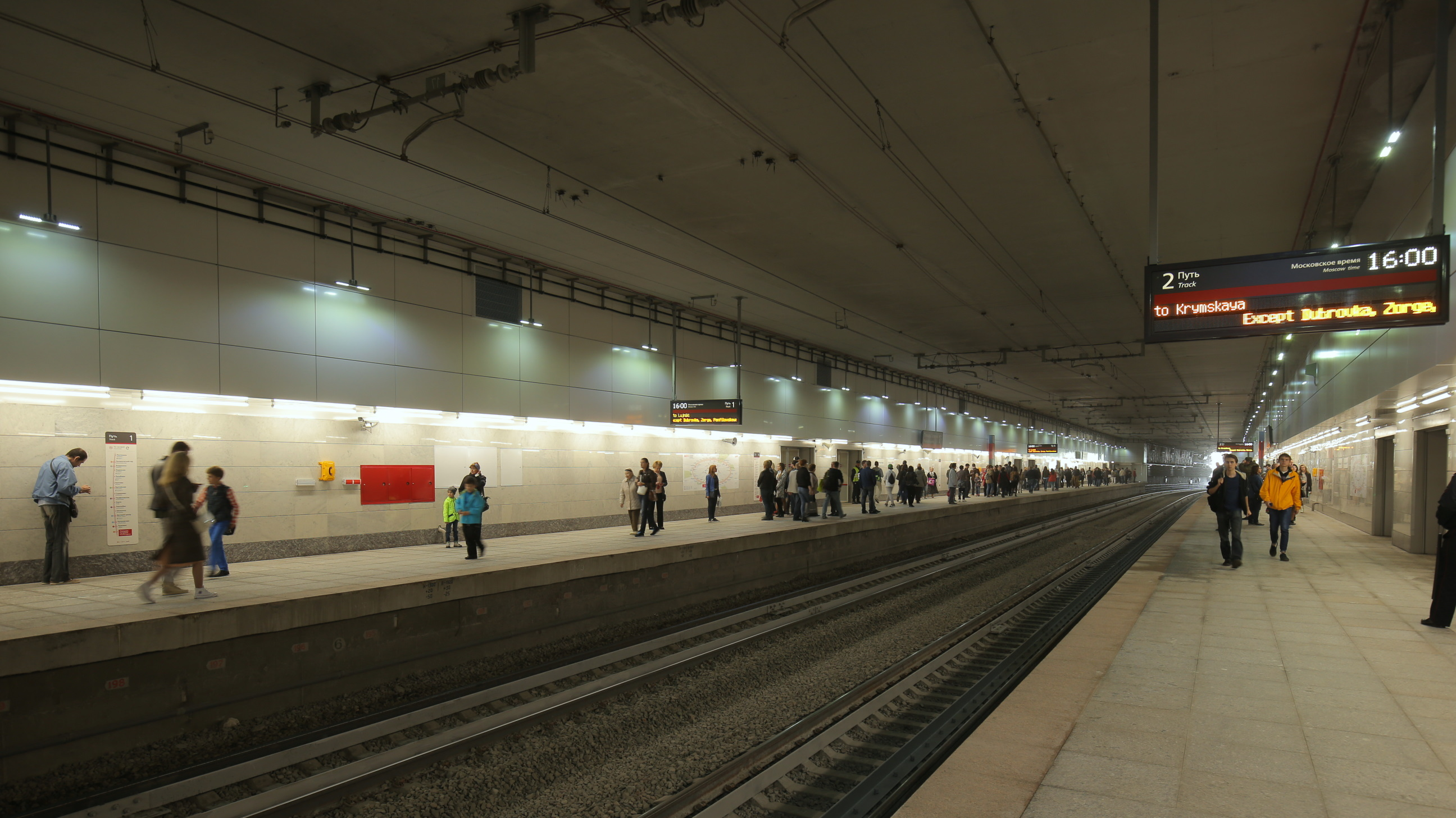

General information
- Coordinates: 55.7071°N 37.5858°E
- System: Moscow Metro
- Line: Moscow Central Circle
- Platforms: 2 side platforms
- Tracks: 2

Construction
- Structure type: Underground

History
- Opened: 10 September 2016; 9 years ago

Services
Preceding station	Moscow Metro	Following station
Krymskaya anticlockwise / outer	Moscow Central Circle	Luzhniki clockwise / inner
Out-of-station interchange
Akademicheskaya towards Novoyasenevskaya	Kaluzhsko-Rizhskaya line transfer at Leninsky Prospekt	Shabolovskaya towards Medvedkovo
Route map
Location
- Location within Moscow Metro

Ploshchad Gagarina (Russian: Площадь Гагарина, Gagarin's Square) is a station on the Moscow Central Circle of the Moscow Metro. The station offers a free direct transfer to Leninsky Prospekt of the Kaluzhsko-Rizhskaya Line. Ploshchad Gagarina is the only underground station on the Moscow Central Circle line.

After its first month of service, the station was the most used on the line with daily ridership of 25,800 passengers. The second most heavily used station was Vladykino with 18,300 passengers. As of January 2017, the station remains the most heavily trafficked on the line.

== Gallery ==
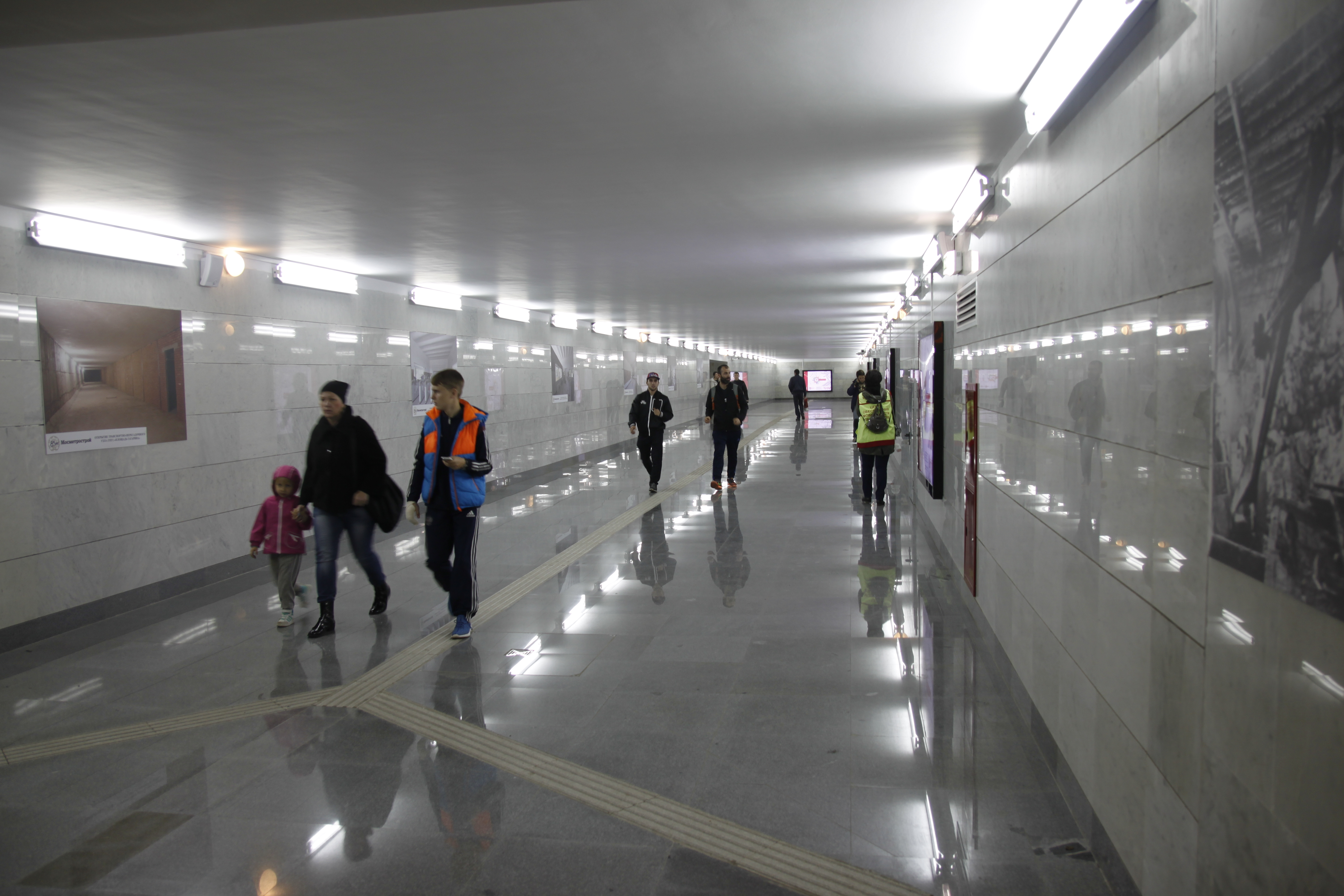
Underground interchange to Leninsky Prospekt station (Line 6)

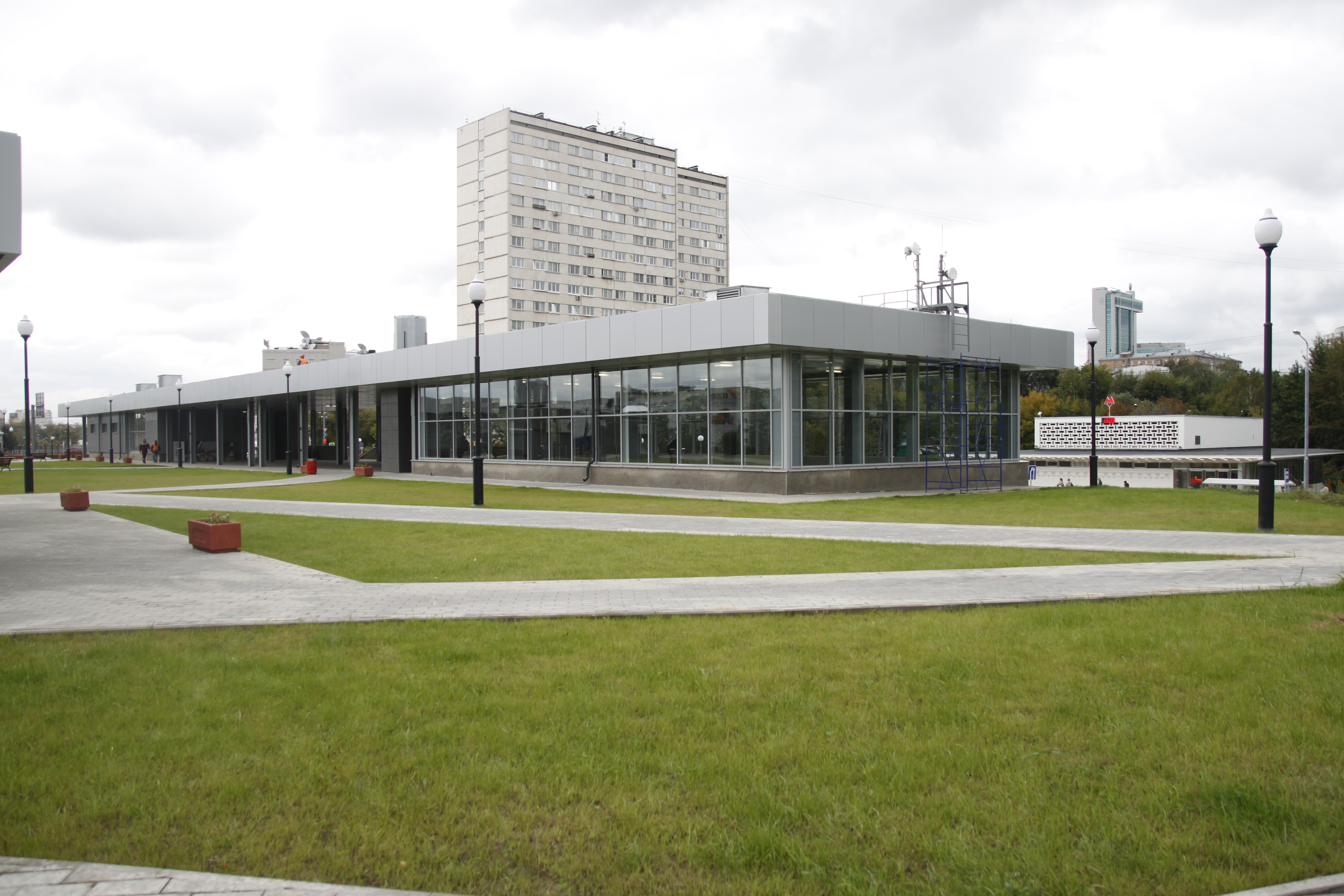
Standalone entrance to the station

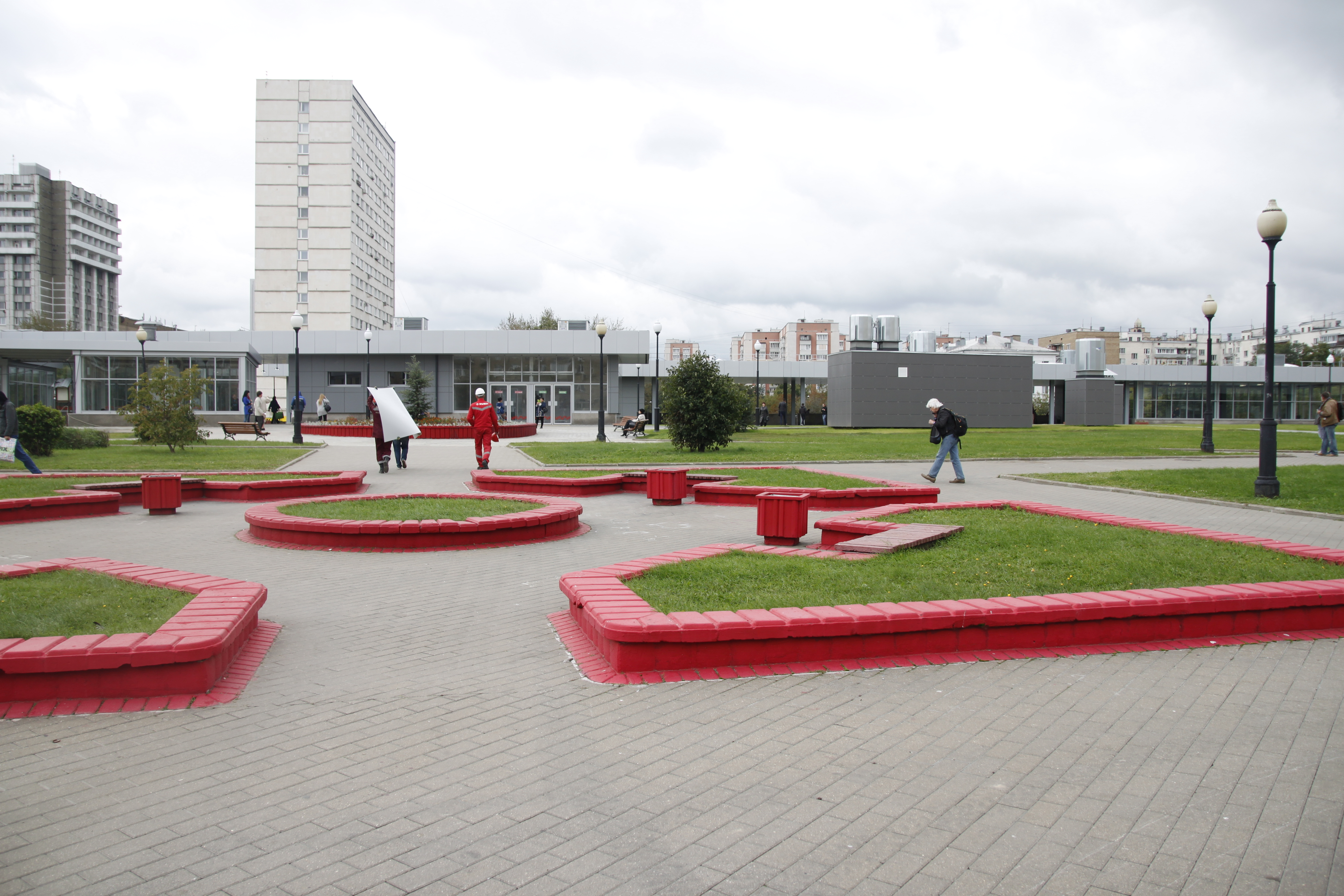
Park-like setup of benches near the entrance (the park is elevated above the surrounding streets)
