= Vorobyovy Gory (Moscow Metro) =

Moscow Metro station

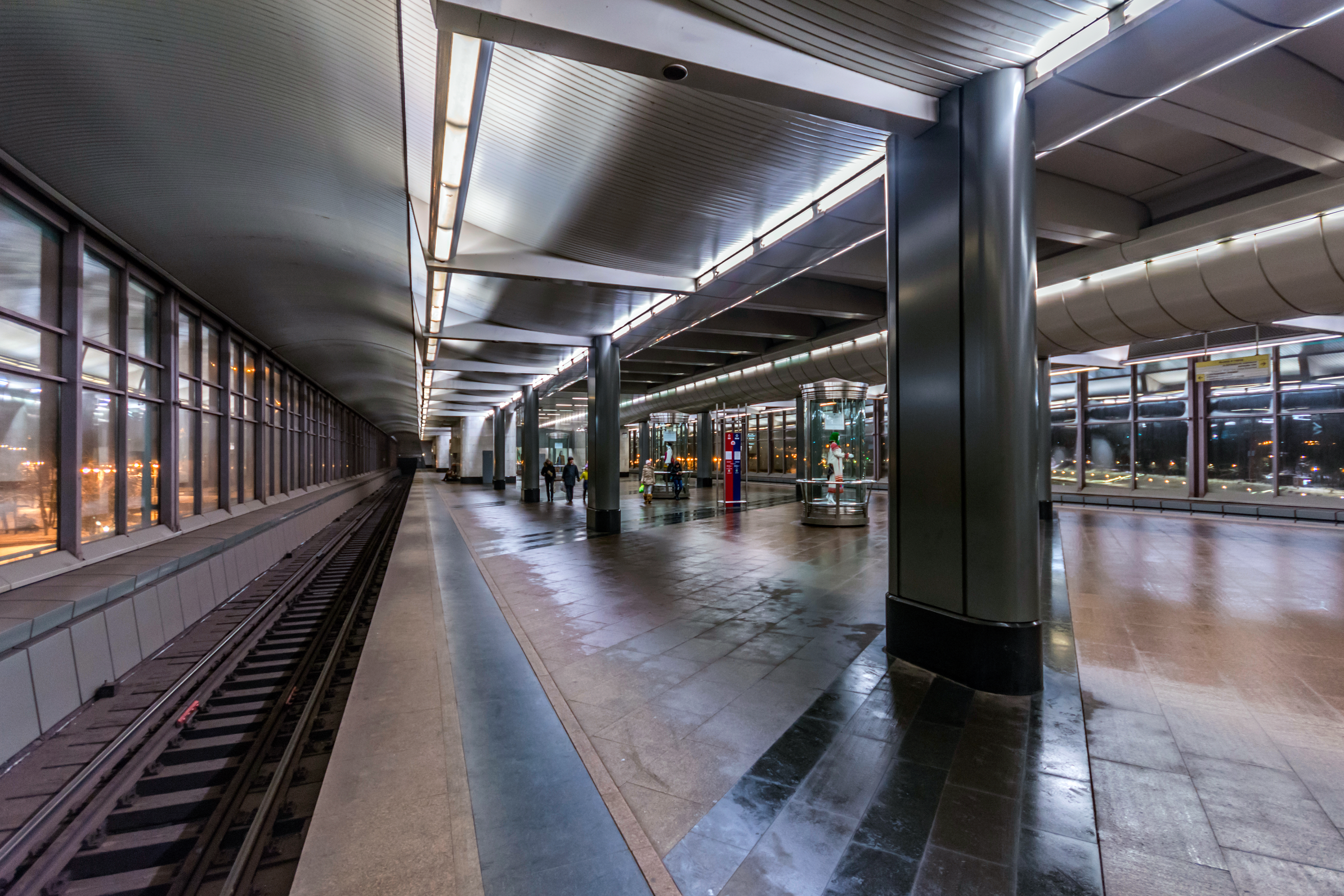

General information
- Location: Gagarinsky District; Ramenki District; Khamovniki District; Western Administrative Okrug; Central Administrative Okrug; South-Western Administrative Okrug; Moscow; Russia
- Coordinates: 55.7103°N 37.5592°E
- System: Moscow Metro station
- Owner: Moskovsky Metropoliten
- Line: Sokolnicheskaya line
- Platforms: 1 island platform
- Tracks: 2

Construction
- Platform levels: 1
- Parking: No
- Cycle facilities: No

Other information
- Station code: 016

History
- Opened: 12 January 1959; 67 years ago
- Rebuilt: 20 October 1983; 43 years ago to 14 December 2002; 23 years ago
- Former names: Leninskye Gory

Services
Preceding station	Moscow Metro	Following station
Universitet towards Potapovo	Sokolnicheskaya line	Sportivnaya towards Bulvar Rokossovskogo
Route map
Location
- Location within Moscow Metro

Vorobyovy Gory (Russian: Воробьёвы го́ры, lit. Sparrow Hills) is a Moscow Metro station. It is on the Sokolnicheskaya Line, between Universitet and Sportivnaya stations. Its name originates from a nearby elevated area literally translated as Sparrow Hills.

== History ==
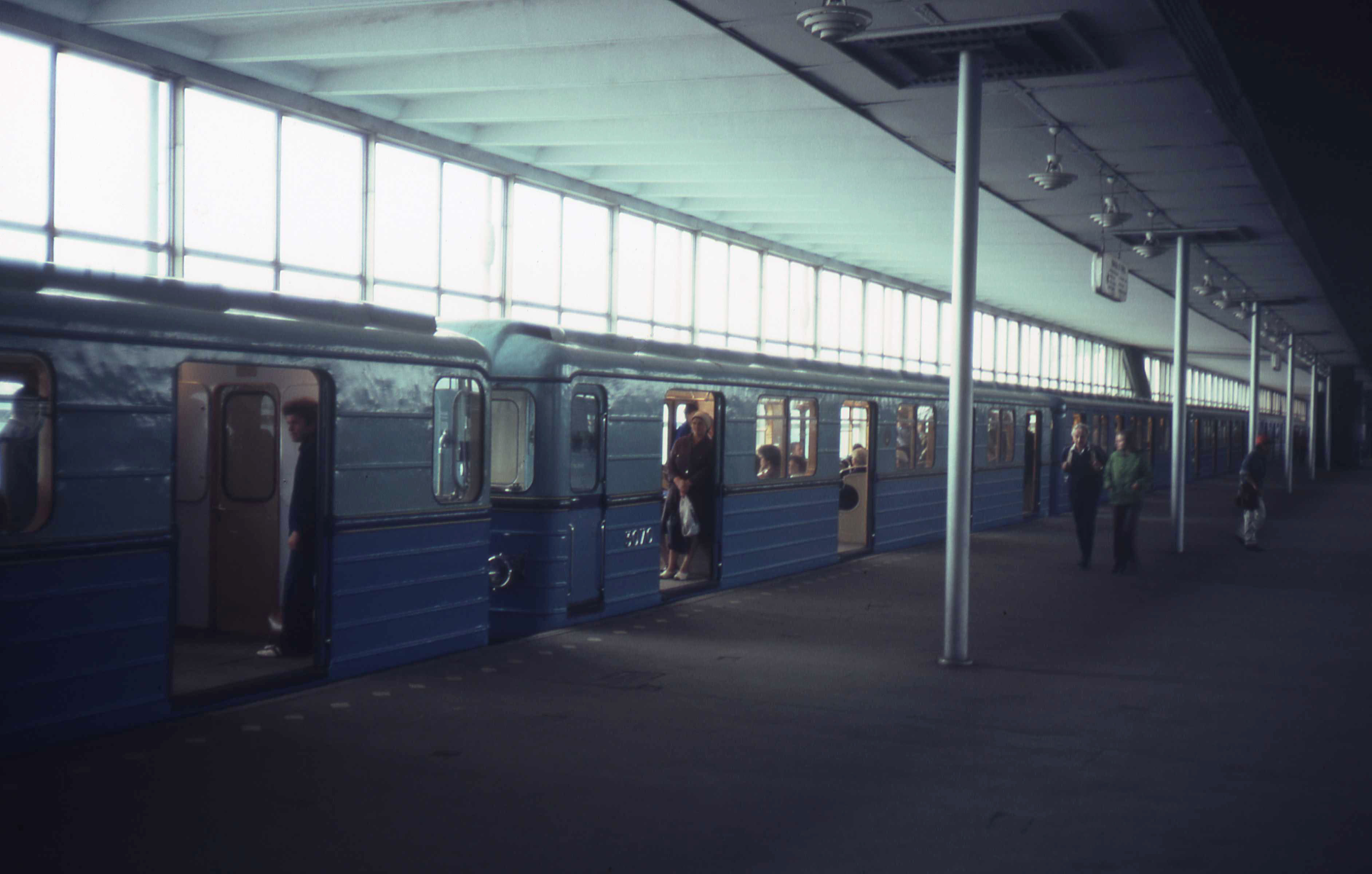
In 1982 before reconstruction

The bridge, which is known as the Luzhniki Metro Bridge, or simply "Metromost", and spans the Moskva River, was originally built in 1958. The architects for the project were M. P. Bubnov, A. S. Markelov, M. F. Markovsky, A. K. Ryzhkov, and B. I. Tkhor. The bridge, hastily built, was plagued by corrosion and seeping water and fell into disrepair. It was deemed structurally unsound by 1984, so the station (at the time called Leninskiye Gory) was "temporarily" closed for repairs and trains were rerouted to temporary bridges alongside. Eighteen years later on December 14, 2002, the newly renovated station was opened to the public once again. As the historic name of Sparrow Hills (Vorobiovy Gory) (renamed Lenin Hills in 1935) was restored in 1999, the station was named in honor of the landmark.

== Design ==
Built into the lower level of a bridge, it is unique in the city. At 282 metres (925 ft) in length, the platform is the longest in the system as the station needed to be accessible from both sides of the river. It is also the highest station above ground level at 15 metres (50 ft), though this is less remarkable since all but a handful of Metro stations are underground. Apart from its dimensions, Vorobyovy Gory is also notable in being the only Moscow Metro station with windows.
