= Kakhovskaya (Moscow Metro) =

Moscow Metro station

Kakhovskaya Каховская
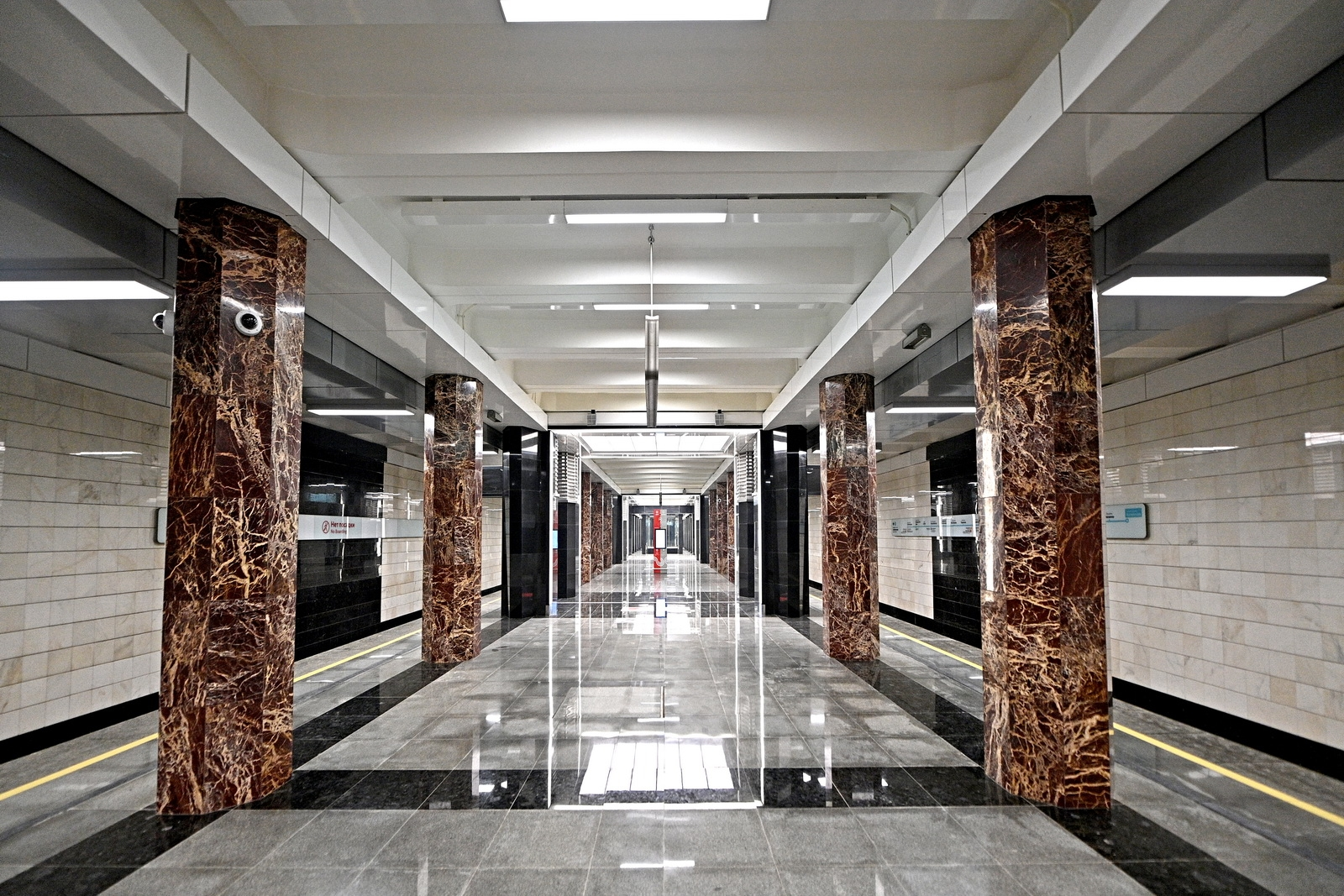
- Station after reconstruction.

General information
- Location: Zyuzino District; South-Western Administrative Okrug; Moscow; Russia
- Coordinates: 55.6530°N 37.5983°E
- System: Moscow Metro station
- Owner: Moskovsky Metropoliten
- Line: Bolshaya Koltsevaya line
- Platforms: 1
- Tracks: 2
- Connections: Bus: 57, 168, 189, 218, 218к, 222, 224, 651, 786, 826; Trolleybus: 60, 72

Construction
- Depth: 8 metres (26 ft)
- Platform levels: 1
- Parking: No

Other information
- Station code: 026

History
- Opened: 11 August 1969; 57 years ago
- Closed: 30 March 2019; 7 years ago
- Rebuilt: 7 December 2021; 4 years ago

Services
Preceding station	Moscow Metro	Following station
Varshavskaya anticlockwise / outer	Bolshaya Koltsevaya line	Zyuzino clockwise / inner
Nakhimovsky Prospekt towards Altufyevo	Serpukhovsko-Timiryazevskaya line transfer at Sevastopolskaya	Chertanovskaya towards Bulvar Dmitriya Donskogo
Route map
Location
- Location within Moscow Metro

Kakhovskaya (Russian: Каховская) is a station of the Moscow Metro's Bolshaya Koltsevaya line. It was temporarily closed for reconstruction on 30 March 2019. It was opened on 11 August 1969 as the southern terminus of the Zamoskvoretskaya line, and from 1983 until 1995 was the terminus of the Kahovskaya branch of this line. Since the detachment of the future Bolshaya Koltsevaya line on 30 March 2019, the station has been its western terminus.

== History ==
The station was designed by architects Nikolay Demchinsky and Yuliya Kolesnikova. The station's design is that of a standard 1960s Moscow pillar-trispan "sorokonozhka" (centipede) with two rows of 40 concrete octagonal pillars faced with brown marble. The floor is laid with great granite and labradorite, as well as asphalt on the platform edge. The station's walls are covered with white ceramic tiles with a pink socle near the tracks. In addition to that the station features a set of metallic plates depicting various episodes from the Russian Civil War (artists and sculptors: V. Gorchakov, L. Soshinskaya, V. Karpov). As part of the reconstruction of the Kakhovskaya line and its future inclusion in the Bolshaya Koltsevaya line, work is underway to replace the entire finish.

The station is located on the Kakhovka Square, where several roads meet up including the Azovskaya Street, Chongarsky Boulevard and the Kakhovka Street. The station's eastern vestibule is located underneath it, with subways exiting to the square, whilst the western vestibule is located under the Chongarsky Boulevard. In 1983, the station Sevastopolskaya of the Serpukhovsko-Timiryazevskaya Line was constructed. This necessitated an arrangement for a transfer provision. Two staircases were opened up descending to the lower station that is located perpendicular to Kakhovskaya.

Behind the station is a set of reversal sidings that are used for train reversal and nighttime stands. In March 2019, this station was temporarily closed for the construction of the second phase of the new ring line, Bolshaya Koltsevaya line, which will include the Kakhovskaya line. In the Bolshaya Koltsevaya line, the Kakhovskaya station will be connected to the existing Kaluzhskaya of the Kaluzhsko-Rizhskaya line, with a new station, Zyuzino, in between. During its expected 2-year-closure, trains of Kakhovskaya line operated between Varshavskaya and Kashirskaya, closed two stations.

The station was reopened on 7 December 2021 as part of the section between Mnyovniki and Kakhovskaya.
