= Nagorny =

Nagorny (masculine), Nagornaya (feminine), or Nagornoye (neuter) may refer to:

== Places in Russia ==
- Nagorny (inhabited locality) (Nagornaya, Nagornoye), name of several inhabited localities in Russia
- Nagorny District in Southern Administrative Okrug of Moscow
- Nagornaya (Moscow Metro), a station of the Moscow Metro
- Nagorny Park in Barnaul, Altai Krai
- Trade Union Sport Palace (KRK Nagorny), an ice sports arena in Nizhny Novgorod

== People ==
- Nagorny (surname)

== See also ==
- Nahirne (disambiguation) (Nagornoye), one of many villages in Ukraine
- Ludmyla Nagorna (1932–2013), Ukrainian scientist
