= Serpukhovsko-Timiryazevskaya line =

Moscow Metro line

Overview
- Locale: Moscow
- Termini: Altufyevo (North); Bulvar Dmitriya Donskogo (South)
- Stations: 25

Service
- Type: Rapid transit
- System: Moscow Metro
- Operator(s): Moskovsky Metropoliten
- Rolling stock: 81-760/761; 81-760A/761A/763A
- Daily ridership: 1,108,800

History
- Opened: November 8, 1983; 42 years ago
- Last extension: 2002

Technical
- Line length: 41.2 kilometres (25.6 mi)
- Character: Underground
- Track gauge: 1,520 mm (4 ft 11 27/32 in)
- Electrification: Third rail

The Serpukhovsko-Timiryazevskaya line (Russian: Серпухо́вско-Тимиря́зевская ли́ния, IPA: [sʲɪrpʊˈxofskə tʲɪmʲɪˈrʲazʲɪfskəjə ˈlʲinʲɪjə]) (Line 9; Grey Line) sometimes colloquially referred to as Grey Line (Russian: серая линия), is a line of the Moscow Metro. Originally opened in 1983, it was extended throughout the 1980s and early 90s and again in the early 2000s. With its current length of 41.2 km (25.6 mi), it is among the longest lines of the Moscow Metro (all underground making it the world's 8th longest rapid transit tunnel). There are 25 stations on the line.

== History ==
The project of a north-south diameter was finalised in the 1971 Moscow General Development Plan, and construction began in the mid-1970s. The first stage, the southern Serpukhovsky radius, was opened in 1983 which brought the Metro to the southern districts of Danilovsky, Nagorny, Ziuzino and Chertanovo Severnoye. Starting at Serpukhovskaya square, the radius follows the Varshavskoye Highway, twice crosses the Paveletsky suburban railway line, deviates slightly westwards passing Azovskaya street, where it meets the erstwhile terminus of the Gorkovsko–Zamoskvoretskaya (before 1984) and Kakhovskaya lines (1983–2019) – Kakhovskaya station. Afterwards, the line crosses the Chertanovo Severnoye's main intersection at Balaklavsky avenue and Sevastopolsky Boulevard and terminates in Chertanovo Tsentralnoye.

Some of the new technical methods employed in the construction of this section included passing from deep alignment to shallow in water-carrying soils. A new technique of contour freezing was applied, which then used explosives to bore through the unstable region. The stretch between Serpukhovskaya and Tulskaya was further made difficult due gasoline leaks from an above petrol station over the years sufficiently absorbed by the soil such that the high concentration of fumes caused a fire in the unfinished tunnel, this introduced a new practice of adding additional boreholes in areas of difficult ventilation.

In November 1985 the line had its first extension southwards to Prazhskaya. This station was designed by Czechoslovak engineers and specialists from the Prague Metro. Simultaneously, the station Moskevská was built in Prague by Soviet engineers.

In the mid-1980s work started on extending the line northwards through the city centre. This very deep section passed the areas of Yakimanka and Arbat where the first 4-station-transfer in Moscow (nicknamed ABBA, by the first letters of its stations: Aleksandrovsky sad–Borovitskaya–Biblioteka imeni Lenina–Arbatskaya) was set up at in 1986. In 1987, the Chekhovskaya station followed, located near the Pushkin Square and offering transfers to Pushkinskaya and Gorkovskaya (now Tverskaya) stations of Zhdanovsko-Krasnopresnenskaya and Gorkovsko-Zamoskvoretskaya lines, respectively. In 1988 the final extension through the centre first deviated eastwards to include Tsvetnoy Bulvar and then crossed the Koltsevaya line at Novoslobodskaya before terminating at Savyolovsky Rail Terminal.

Afterwards, construction of the Timiryazevsky radius followed and in 1991 the major five station extension brought the line along the Dmitrovskoye Highway to the northern districts of Timiryazvesky, Butyrsky, Marfino and Otradnoye while providing three links to the stations of Savyolovsky suburban railway line. The station Timiryazveskaya is the only one in Moscow that has a deep single-vault (Leningrad) design. Two more stations were built north of Otradnoye, Bibirevo in 1992 and Altufyevo in 1994, making the line the northernmost in the system.

On the opposite Serpukhovsky radius, three more stations were built in the early 2000s in southern part of Chertanovo district: Ulitsa Akademika Yangelya (2000), Annino (2001) and Bulvar Dmitriya Donskogo (2002). The latter carried the line into Severnoye Butovo District, making it the first line to cross the MKAD beltway. Today the line is the only one in Moscow for which no extension plans or proposals exist.

=== Timeline ===
Segment	Date opened	Length
Serpukhovskaya–Yuzhnaya	November 11, 1983	13.0 km
Yuzhnaya–Prazhskaya	November 6, 1985	1.1 km
Serpukhovskaya–Borovitskaya	January 23, 1986	2.8 km
Borovitskaya–Chekhovskaya	December 31, 1987	1.6 km
Chekhovskaya–Savyolovskaya	December 31, 1988	4.2 km
Savyolovskaya–Otradnoye	March 3, 1991	8.5 km
Otradnoye–Bibirevo	December 31, 1992	2.6 km
Bibirevo–Altufyevo	July 15, 1994	2.0 km
Prazhskaya–Ulitsa Akademika Yangelya	August 31, 2000	2.0 km
Ulitsa Akademika Yangelya–Annino	December 12, 2001	1.4 km
Annino–Bulvar Dmitriya Donskogo	December 26, 2002	2.0 km
Total		41.5 km

== Stations ==
Station Name		Transfer
English	Russian	Transfer
Altufyevo	Алтуфьево	
Bibirevo	Бибирево	
Otradnoye	Отрадное	
Vladykino	Владыкино	Vladykino
Petrovsko-Razumovskaya	Петровско-Разумовская	Petrovsko-Razumovskaya (cross-platform interchange); Petrovsko-Razumovskaya; Petrovsko-Razumovskaya (under construction)
Timiryazevskaya	Тимирязевская	Timiryazevskaya; Timiryazevskaya
Dmitrovskaya	Дмитровская	Dmitrovskaya; Dmitrovskaya (under construction)
Savyolovskaya	Савёловская	Savyolovskaya; Moscow Savyolovsky; Savyolovsky Terminal
Mendeleyevskaya	Менделеевская	Novoslobodskaya
Tsvetnoy Bulvar	Цветной бульвар	Trubnaya
Chekhovskaya	Чеховская	Tverskaya; Pushkinskaya
Borovitskaya	Боровицкая	Biblioteka Imeni Lenina; Arbatskaya; Aleksandrovsky Sad (via or)
Polyanka	Полянка	
Serpukhovskaya	Серпуховская	Dobryninskaya
Tulskaya	Тульская	
Nagatinskaya	Нагатинская	Verkhniye Kotly; Verkhnie Kotly
Nagornaya	Нагорная	
Nakhimovsky Prospekt	Нахимовский проспект	
Sevastopolskaya	Севастопольская	Kakhovskaya
Chertanovskaya	Чертановская	
Yuzhnaya	Южная	
Prazhskaya	Пражская	
Ulitsa Akademika Yangelya	Улица Академика Янгеля	
Annino	Аннино	
Bulvar Dmitriya Donskogo	Бульвар Дмитрия Донского	Ulitsa Starokachalovskaya

== Rolling stock ==
The line is served by the Varshavskoe (№ 8) and Vladykino (№ 14) depots. In 2005 it began a slow transition to eight carriage trains. As of November 2005, Vladykino completed its transition and presently has 43 eight-carriage trains assigned to them. Varshavskoe began later and completed its transition in March 2006 with 38 eight-carriage trains. The line received new 81-714/717 trains upon its opening in 1983. Due to its recent extensions various trains were added to its ever-growing stock, some surplus from other depots, others factory fresh 81-714.5/717.5 and 81-714.5M/717.5M.

Starting 2012, the line began receiving new 81-760/761 trains. 81-717/714 trains have been completely withdrawn and scrapped, 81-717.5/714.5 and 81-717.5M/714.5M were transferred to other lines where additional trains were needed. In November 2013, the Varshavskoe depot was fully upgraded to new trains, there were only a few old 81-717/714 carriages, which formed about three trains. Vladykino, as of November 2013, only had two new trains, but additional 81-760/761s came from the Varshavskoe depot in December 2013.

Subway car types used on the line over the years:

-Series 81-717: 1983 - March 2015

-Series 81-717.5: 1994 - March 2015

-Series 81-717.5M: 2003 - March 2015

-Series 81-760/761: 26 December 2012 – present

== Recent events and future plans ==
Second exits at Petrovsko-Razumovskaya, Savyolovskaya and Timiryazevskaya stations are planned. However, in terms of extensions, the line is considered to be complete. Although there is some need of connection to the south border parts of Moscow, it was decided that Butovskaya Light Metro Line will fulfil this need.
