= Chertanovskaya =

Moscow Metro station

Chertanovskaya Чертановская
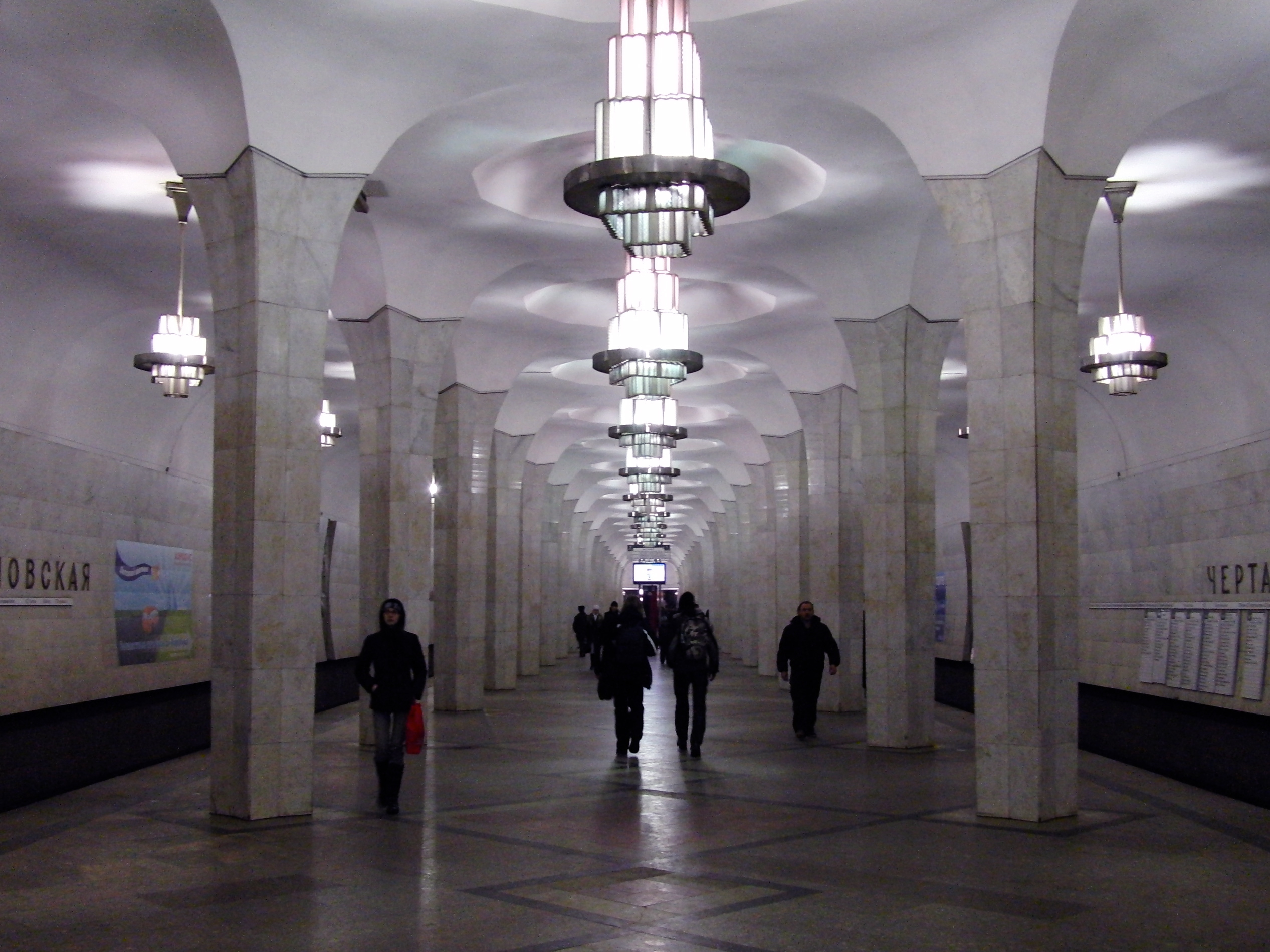

General information
- Location: Chertanovo Severnoye District; Zyuzino District; Southern Administrative Okrug; South-Western Administrative Okrug; Moscow; Russia
- Coordinates: 55.6405°N 37.6067°E
- System: Moscow Metro station
- Owner: Moskovsky Metropoliten
- Line: Serpukhovsko-Timiryazevskaya line
- Platforms: 1 island platform
- Tracks: 2

Construction
- Platform levels: 1
- Parking: No

Other information
- Station code: 148

History
- Opened: 8 November 1983; 42 years ago

Services
Preceding station	Moscow Metro	Following station
Sevastopolskaya towards Altufyevo	Serpukhovsko-Timiryazevskaya line	Yuzhnaya towards Bulvar Dmitriya Donskogo
Route map
Location
- Location within Moscow Metro

Chertanovskaya (Russian: Чертановская) is a station on the Serpukhovsko-Timiryazevskaya Line of the Moscow Metro. It was designed by architect Nina Alyoshina and opened in 1983.

== Gallery ==
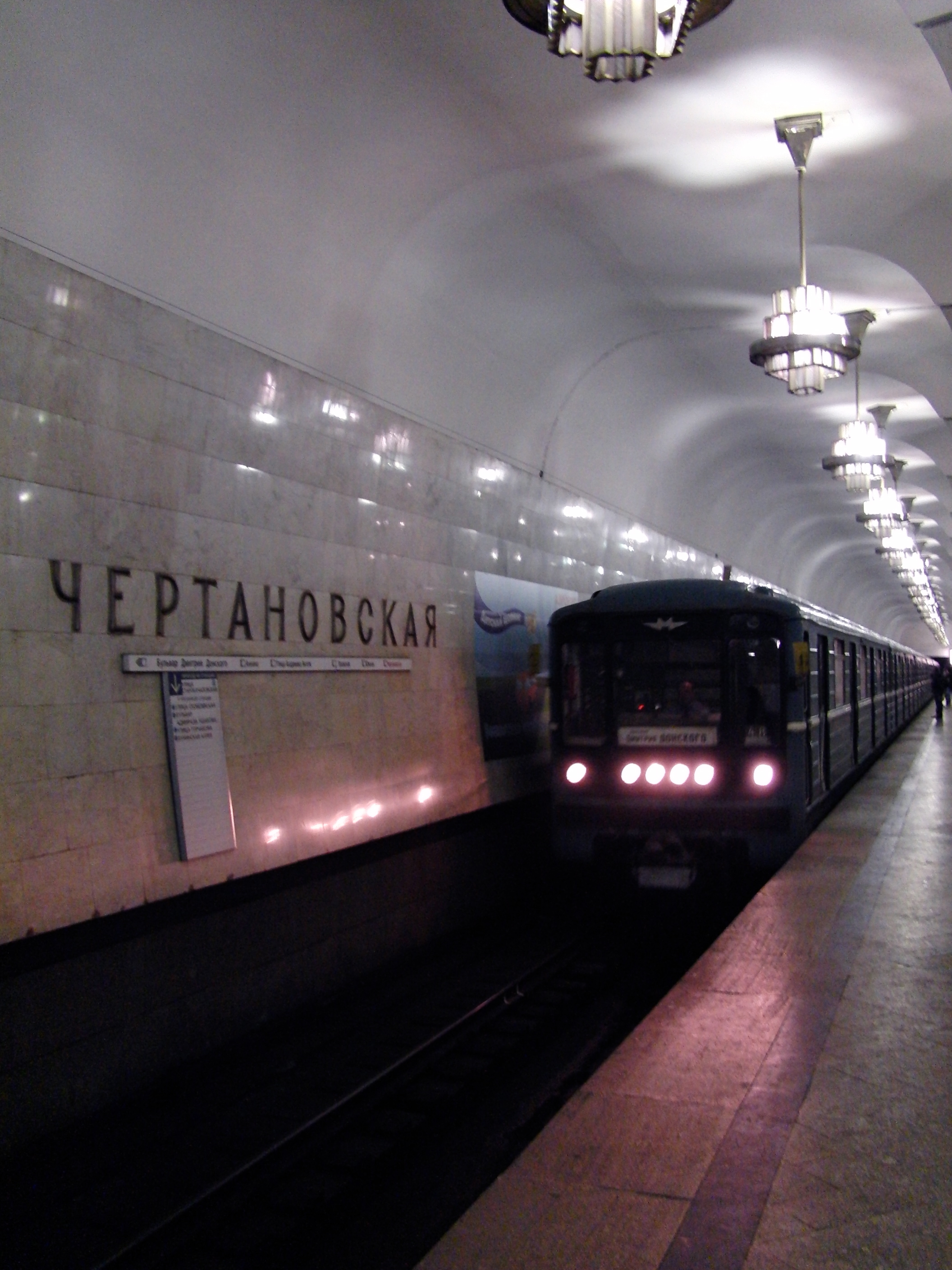
Arriving train on the platform

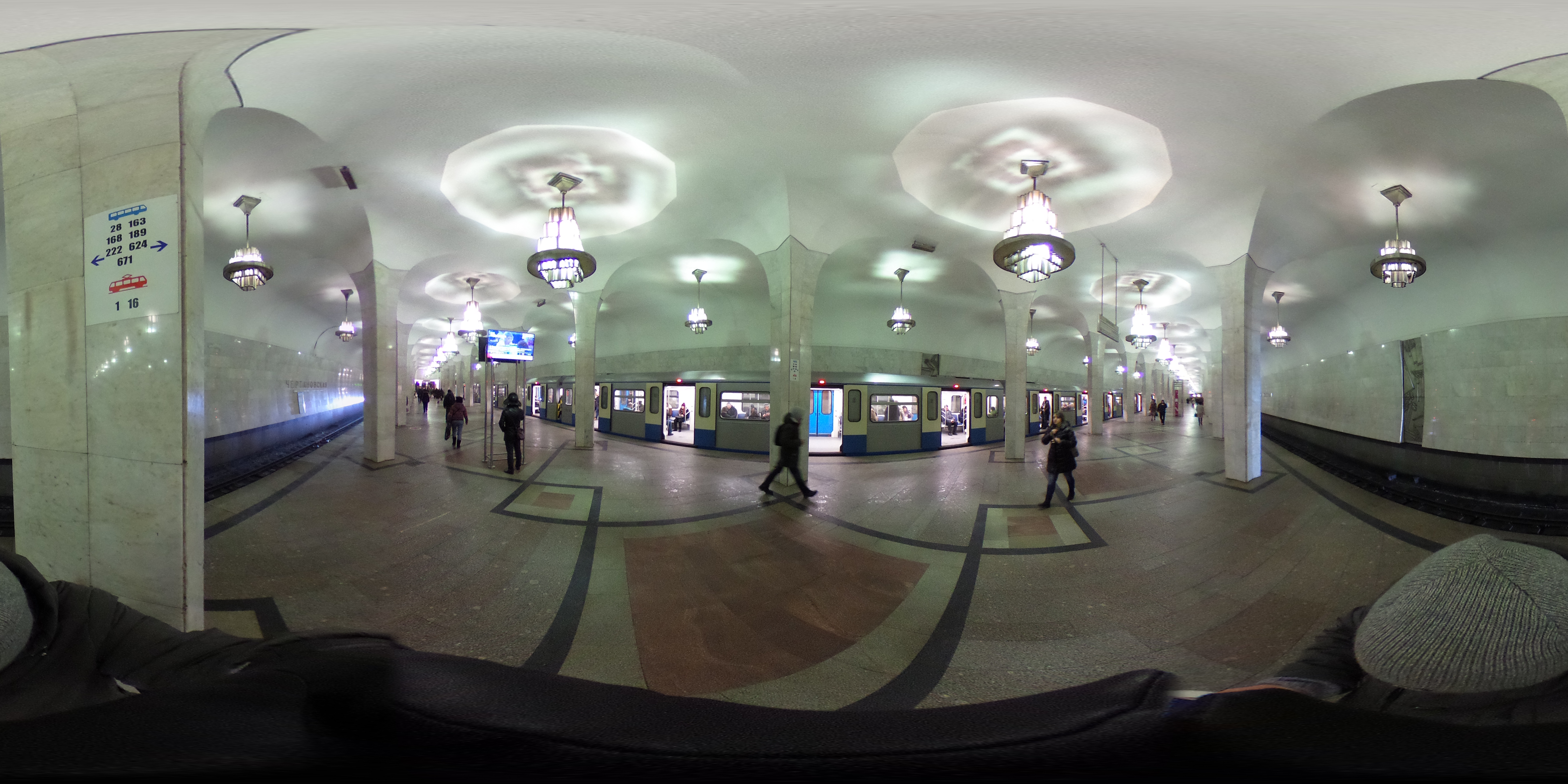
Spherical panoram of main hall (view as a 360° interactive panorama)
