= Yuzhnaya (Moscow Metro) =

Moscow Metro station

Yuzhnaya Южная
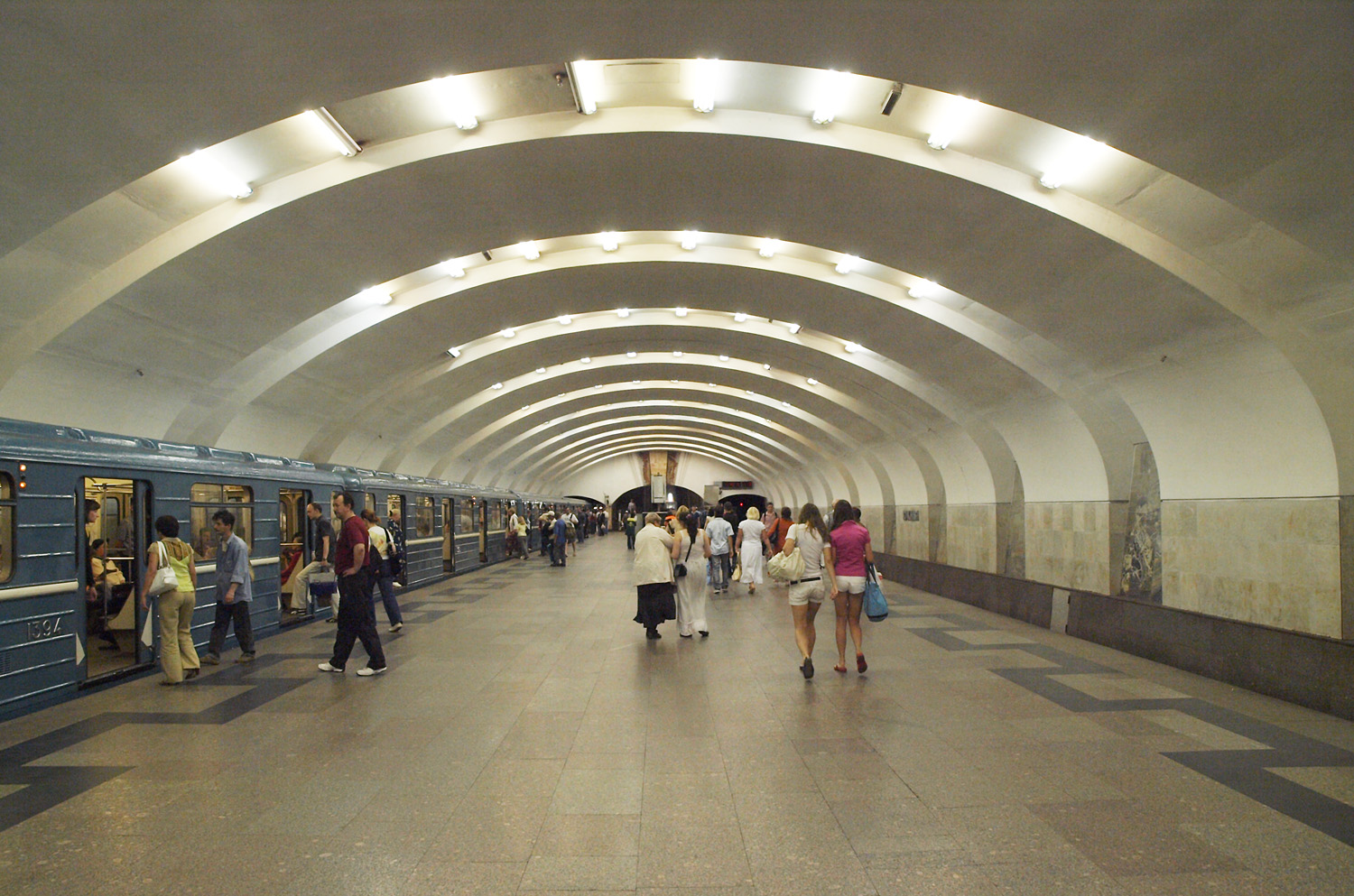

General information
- Location: Chertanovo Severnoye District; Chertanovo Tsentralnoye District; Southern Administrative Okrug; Moscow; Russia
- Coordinates: 55.6224°N 37.6090°E
- System: Moscow Metro station
- Owner: Moskovsky Metropoliten
- Line: Serpukhovsko-Timiryazevskaya line
- Platforms: 1 island platform
- Tracks: 2

Construction
- Platform levels: 1
- Parking: No

Other information
- Station code: 149

History
- Opened: 8 November 1983; 42 years ago

Services
Preceding station	Moscow Metro	Following station
Chertanovskaya towards Altufyevo	Serpukhovsko-Timiryazevskaya line	Prazhskaya towards Bulvar Dmitriya Donskogo
Route map
Location
- Location within Moscow Metro

Yuzhnaya (Russian: Южная, English: Southern) is a station on the Serpukhovsko-Timiryazevskaya Line of the Moscow Metro. It was designed by V. A. Cheremin and R. Bazhenov and opened in 1983.

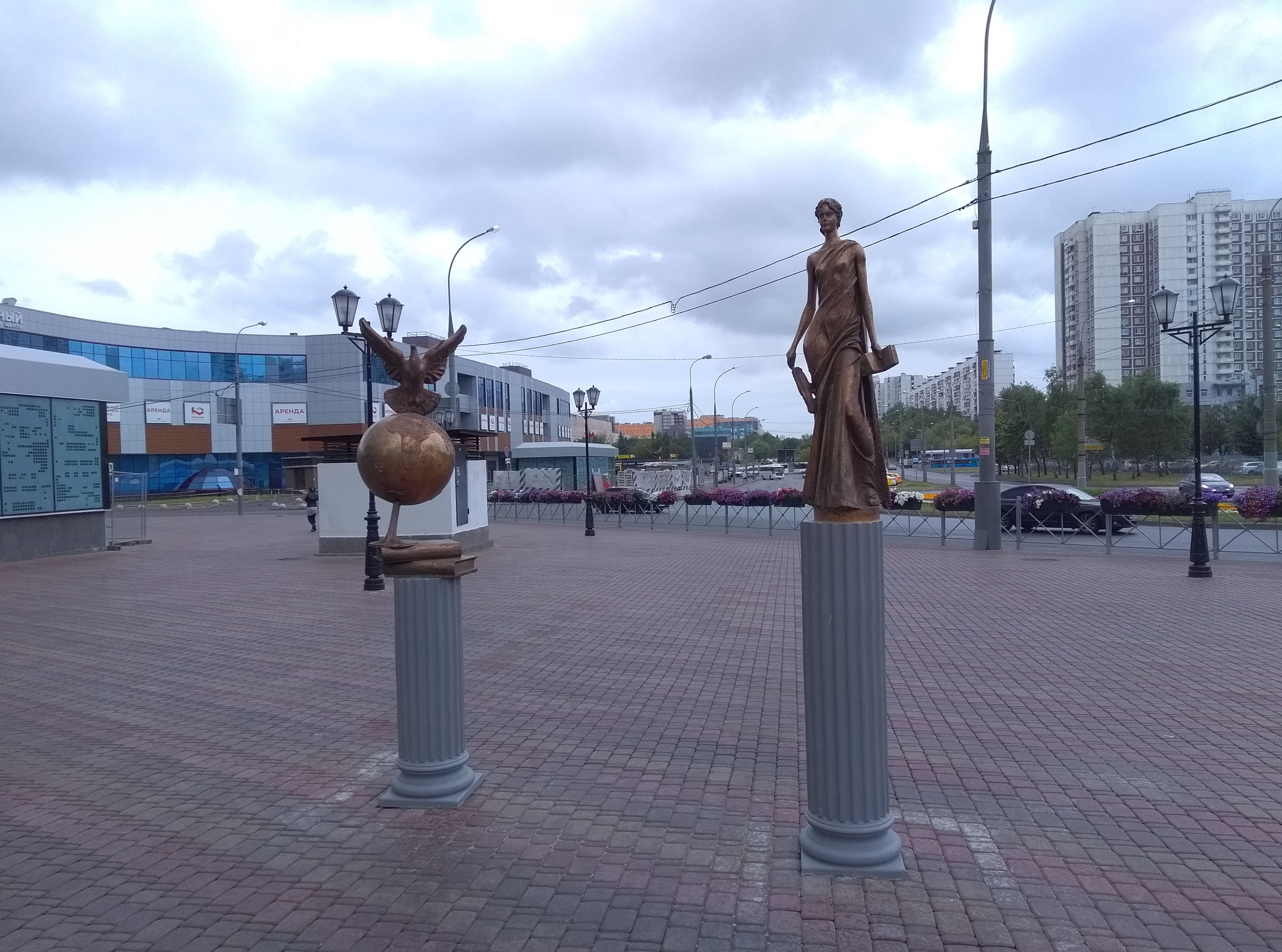
Sculptures near Yuzhnaya metro station
