= Prazhskaya =

Moscow Metro station

Prazhskaya Пражская
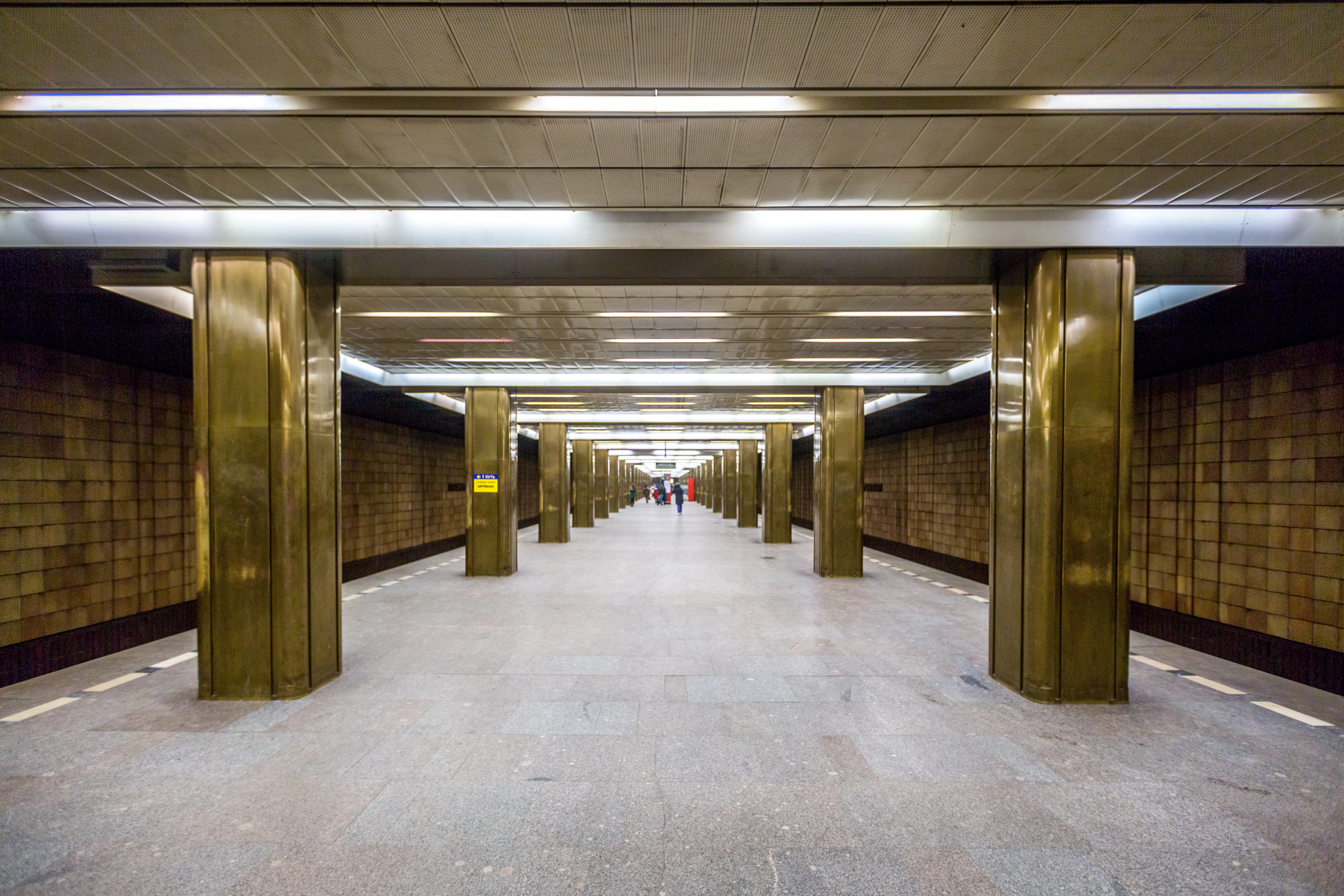

General information
- Location: Chertanovo Tsentralnoye District; Southern Administrative Okrug; Moscow; Russia
- Coordinates: 55.6124°N 37.6044°E
- System: Moscow Metro station
- Owner: Moskovsky Metropoliten
- Line: Serpukhovsko-Timiryazevskaya line
- Platforms: 1 island platform
- Tracks: 2

Construction
- Platform levels: 1
- Parking: No

Other information
- Station code: 150

History
- Opened: 6 November 1985; 40 years ago

Services
Preceding station	Moscow Metro	Following station
Yuzhnaya towards Altufyevo	Serpukhovsko-Timiryazevskaya line	Ulitsa Akademika Yangelya towards Bulvar Dmitriya Donskogo
Route map
Location
- Location within Moscow Metro

Prazhskaya (Russian: Пражская) is a station on the Serpukhovsko-Timiryazevskaya Line of the Moscow Metro. As part of a cultural exchange between the Soviet Union and Czechoslovakia, the station was designed in the style of the Prague Metro by Czech architects E. Kyllar, Z. Chalupa, and E. Břusková along with Soviet architect V. A. Cheremin. A corresponding station named Moskevská (currently named Anděl) in Prague was designed by Soviet architects and opened concurrently.

== Gallery ==
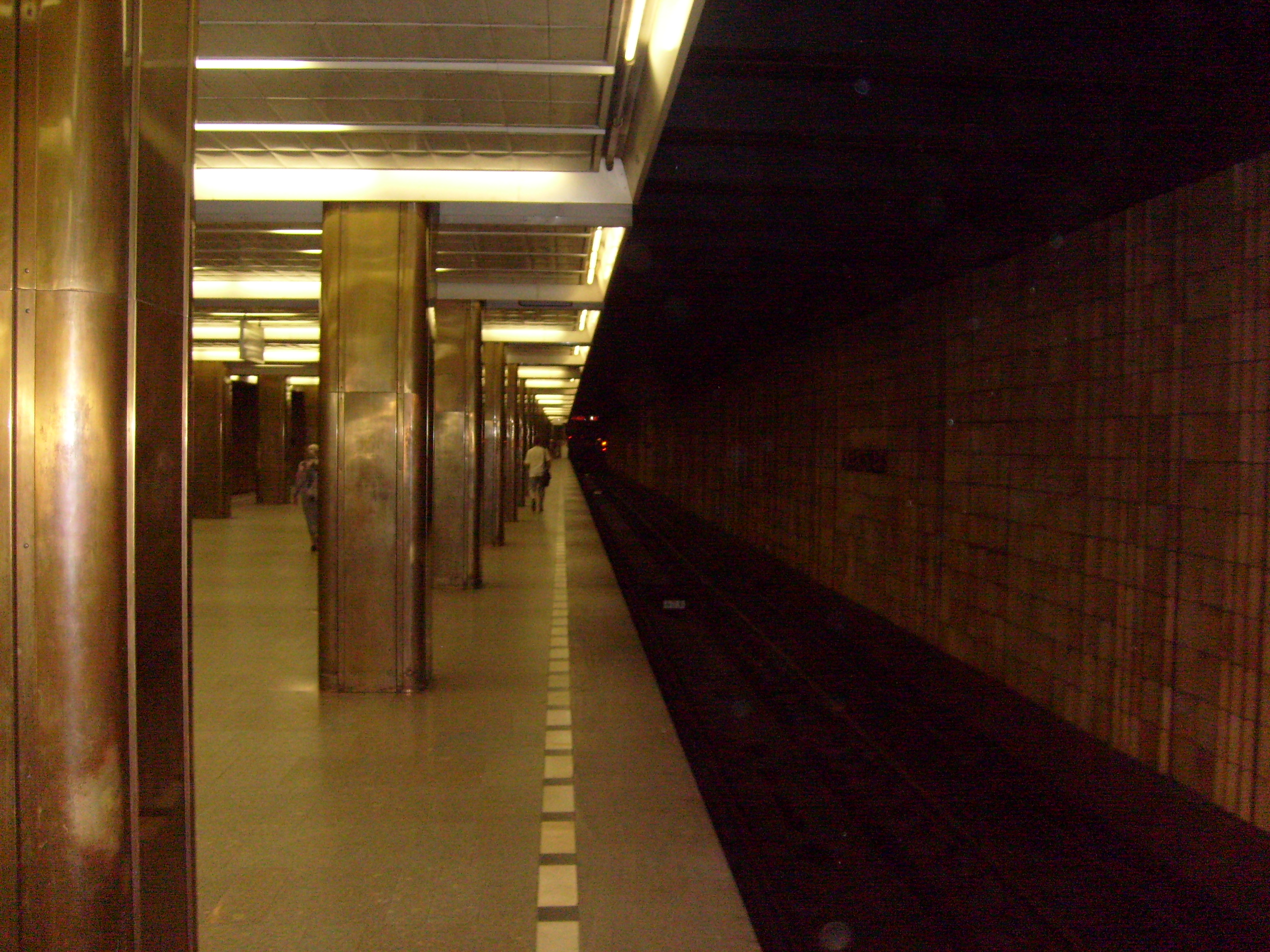
Station platform with the Prague Metro design
