= Vladykino (Serpukhovsko-Timiryazevskaya line) =

Moscow Metro station

Vladykino Владыкино
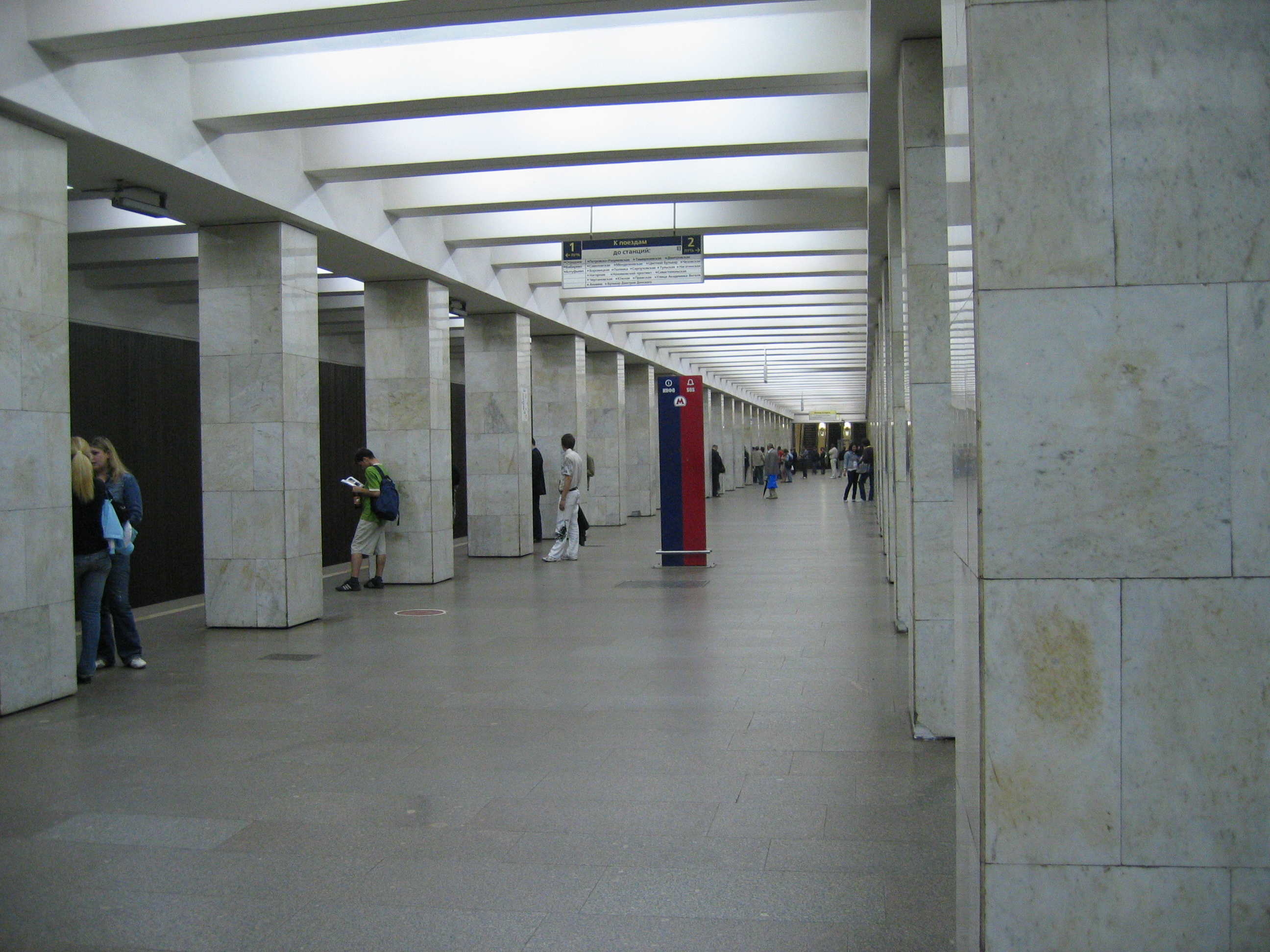

General information
- Location: Otradnoye District; Marfino District; North-Eastern Administrative Okrug; Moscow; Russia
- Coordinates: 55.8473°N 37.5899°E
- System: Moscow Metro station
- Owner: Moskovsky Metropoliten
- Line: Serpukhovsko-Timiryazevskaya line
- Platforms: 1 island platform
- Tracks: 2

Construction
- Structure type: shallow column station, triple-span
- Depth: 10.5 metres (34 ft)
- Platform levels: 1
- Parking: No

Other information
- Station code: 132

History
- Opened: 1 March 1991; 35 years ago

Services
Preceding station	Moscow Metro	Following station
Otradnoye towards Altufyevo	Serpukhovsko-Timiryazevskaya line	Petrovsko-Razumovskaya towards Bulvar Dmitriya Donskogo
Out-of-station interchange
Okruzhnaya anticlockwise / outer	Moscow Central Circle transfer at Vladykino	Botanichesky Sad clockwise / inner
Route map
Location
- Location within Moscow Metro

Vladykino (Russian: Владыкино) is a station on the Serpukhovsko–Timiryazevskaya line of the Moscow Metro. The station provides transfer to Vladykino station on the Moscow Central Circle. The Serpukhovsko-Timiryazevskaya line is 25.6 miles long and has 25 stations. Running north to south, it is the longest continuous underground line in the Moscow Metro, and the 8th longest in the world.

With the entire line being completely underground, it is quite densely populated, with no fewer than 9 different factions inhabiting it (a number only rivaled by the Arbatsko-Pokrovskaya line).

== History ==
The station was opened on March 7, 1991 as part of the section "Savelovskaya" - "Otradnoe", after the commissioning of which there were 148 stations in the Moscow Metro.

== Registration ==
The track walls are lined with brown corrugated sheet, which makes the station look dark and gloomy. There are several breaks with dark marble inserts decorated with medallions depicting architectural structures of various religions (author A. M. Mosiychuk).

- Venice - Church of San Giorgio Maggiore
- Japan - Matsumoto Castle
- India - Taj Mahal
- Vladykino — Church of the Nativity of the Virgin
- Kizhi - Chapel of Michael the Archangel
- Bukhara - Chor-Minor Madrasah
- Vladimir - Golden Gate
- Georgia - Nikortsminda Temple

White marble is used in the decoration of the columns. The floor is lined with dark granite.

The design of the station's track hall is partly similar to the design of the Shchukinskaya station hall.

== Lobbies and transplants ==
Exit to the city on both sides of the railway tracks through glazed lobbies in the form of a rotunda to Susokolovskoye highway and Signalny proezd. Near the station there is the central entrance to the Moscow Botanical Garden of Academy of Sciences and the Voskhod Hotel.

Free transfer between the metro station and the MCC station of the same name is possible.
