= Otradnoye (Moscow Metro) =

Moscow Metro station

Otradnoye Отрадное
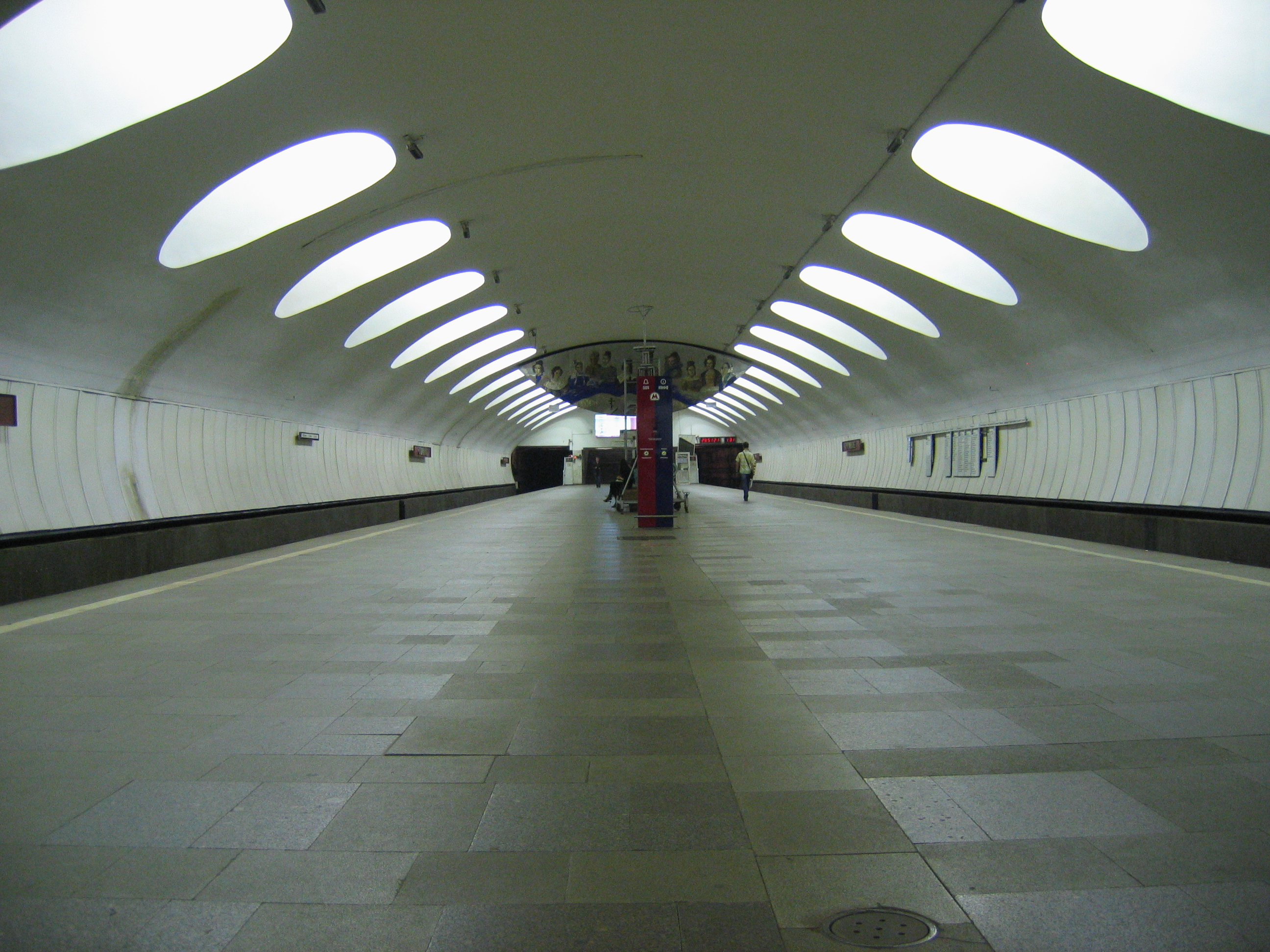

General information
- Location: Otradnoye District; North-Eastern Administrative Okrug; Moscow; Russia
- Coordinates: 55.8633°N 37.6047°E
- System: Moscow Metro station
- Owner: Moskovsky Metropoliten
- Line: Serpukhovsko-Timiryazevskaya line
- Platforms: 1 island platform
- Tracks: 2

Construction
- Structure type: Shallow level single-vault station
- Platform levels: 1
- Parking: No

Other information
- Station code: 131

History
- Opened: 1 March 1991; 35 years ago

Services
Preceding station	Moscow Metro	Following station
Bibirevo towards Altufyevo	Serpukhovsko-Timiryazevskaya line	Vladykino towards Bulvar Dmitriya Donskogo
Route map
Location
- Location within Moscow Metro

Otradnoye (Russian: Отрадное) is a station of the Serpukhovsko-Timiryazevskaya Line of the Moscow Metro. It was opened in 1991, being the last Metro station opened in Soviet Union, and built to a single-vault technology. The station contains several mosaic artworks.
