= Sevastopolskaya (Moscow Metro) =

Moscow Metro station

Sevastopolskaya Севастопольская
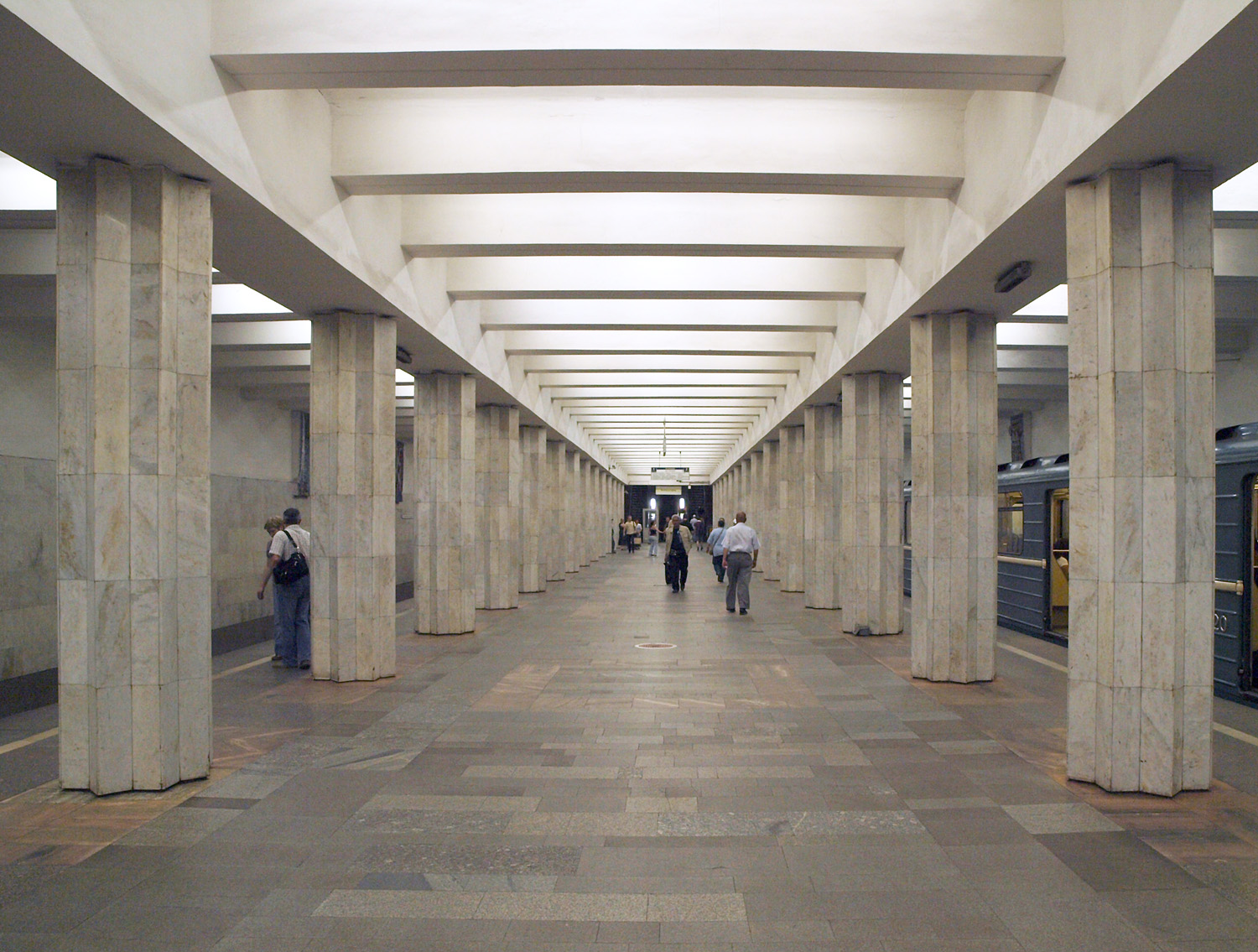

General information
- Location: Zyuzino District; South-Western Administrative Okrug; Moscow; Russia
- Coordinates: 55.6524°N 37.5984°E
- System: Moscow Metro station
- Owner: Moskovsky Metropoliten
- Line: Serpukhovsko-Timiryazevskaya line
- Platforms: 1 island platform
- Tracks: 2

Construction
- Structure type: Shallow column tri-vault
- Platform levels: 1
- Parking: No

Other information
- Station code: 147

History
- Opened: 8 November 1983; 42 years ago

Services
| Preceding station | Moscow Metro | Following station |
|---|---|---|
| Nakhimovsky Prospekt towards Altufyevo | Serpukhovsko-Timiryazevskaya line | Chertanovskaya towards Bulvar Dmitriya Donskogo |
| Varshavskaya anticlockwise / outer | Bolshaya Koltsevaya line transfer at Kakhovskaya | Zyuzino clockwise / inner |
Route map
Location
- Location within Moscow Metro

Sevastopolskaya (Russian: Севастопольская) is a station on the Serpukhovsko-Timiryazevskaya line of the Moscow Metro. It was designed by N. I. Demchinsky, Yu. A. Kolesnikova, and Nina Alyoshina, and opened in 1983.

From this station, riders can transfer to Kakhovskaya on the Bolshaya Koltsevaya line. Historically, this was the first interchange in the Moscow Metro outside of the Koltsevaya line.

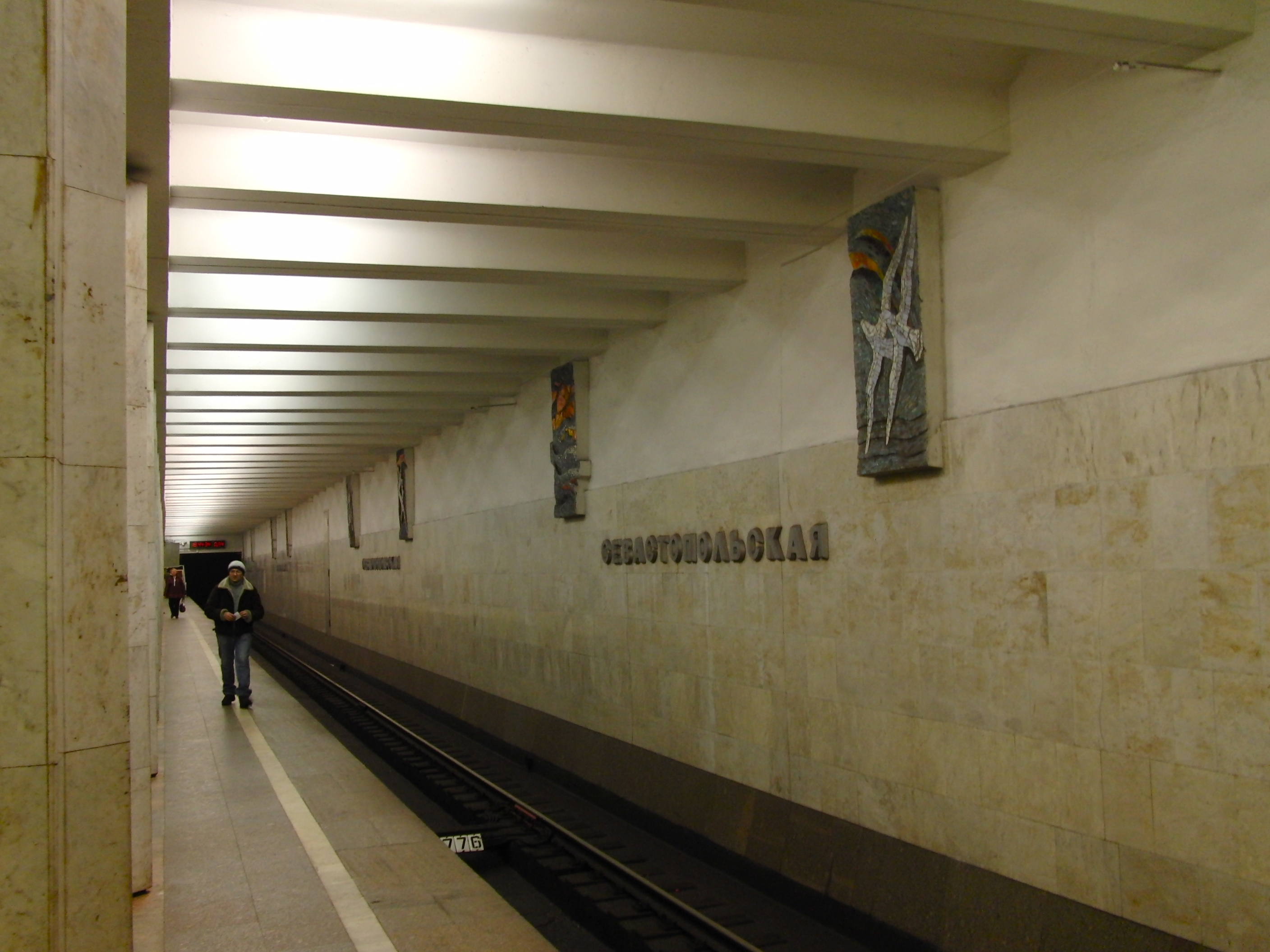
Station platform
