= Bibirevo =

Bibirevo may refer to:

- Bibirevo District, a district of North-Eastern Administrative Okrug of Moscow, Russia
- Bibirevo (village), a village in Tver Oblast, Russia
- Bibirevo (Metro), a station of the Moscow Metro, Moscow, Russia
