= Nahirne =

Nahirne (Ukrainian: Нагірне) can refer to:

- Nahirne, Crimea, a village in the Autonomous Republic of Crimea in Ukraine
- Nahirne, Kharkiv Oblast, a village in Kharkiv Oblast in Ukraine
- Nahirne, Odesa Oblast, a village in Odesa Oblast in Ukraine

== See also ==
- Nagorny (disambiguation), similar place name in the Russian language
