= Zyuzino District =

Zyuzino District район Зюзино (Russian)
- District
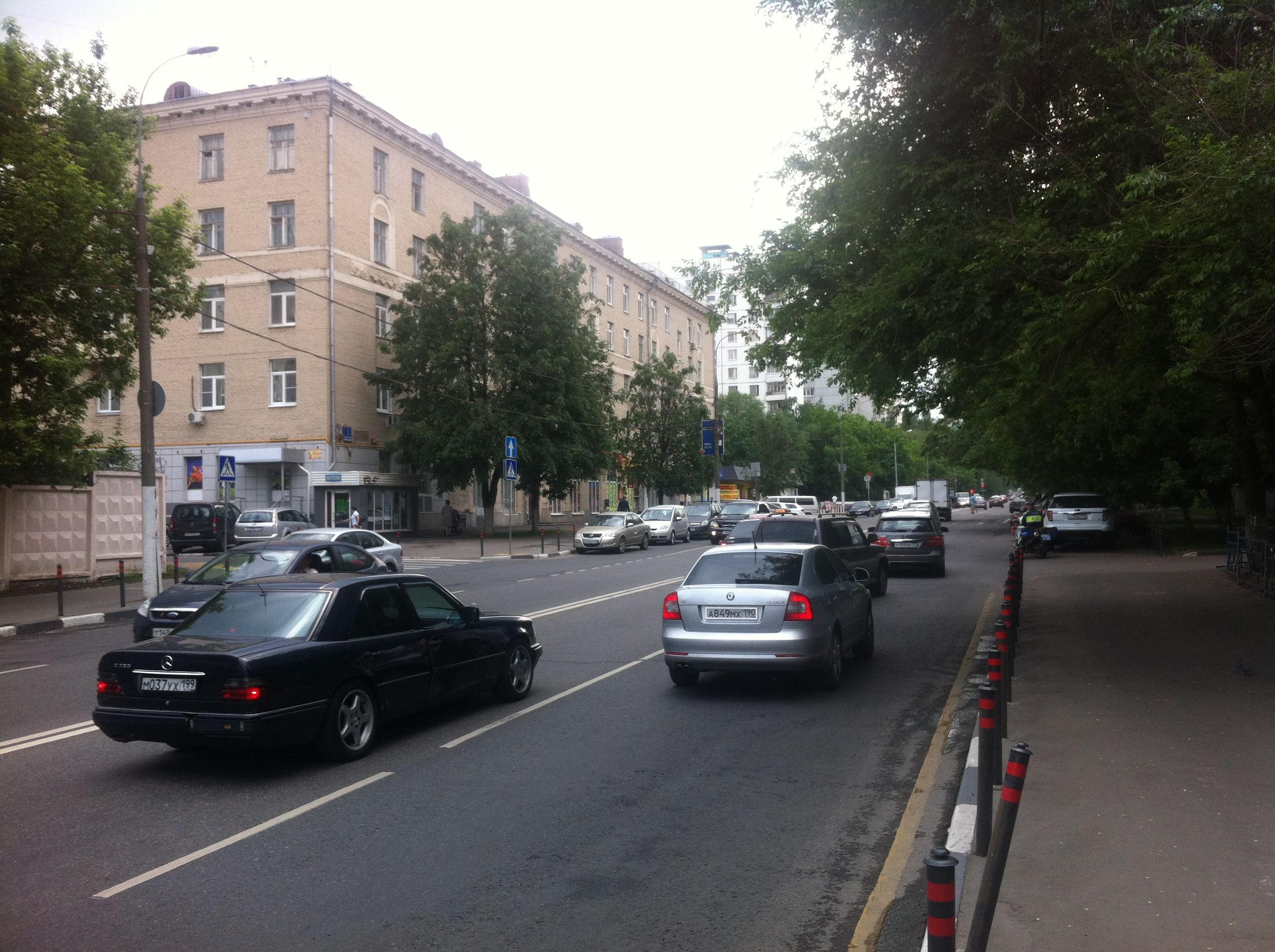
- Azovskaya Street in Zyuzino District

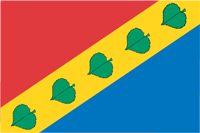
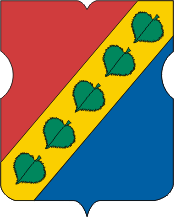
- Flag Coat of arms
- Location of Zyuzino District in Moscow (pre-2012 map)
- Coordinates: 55°39′N 37°35′E
- Country: Russia
- Federal subject: federal city of Moscow

Population (2010 Census)
  - Total: 123,003

Municipal structure
  - Municipally incorporated as: Zyuzino Municipal Okrug
- Time zone: UTC+
- OKTMO ID: 45901000
- Website: http://zuzino.mos.ru

Population of Zyuzino District
- 2010 Census: 123,003
- 2002 Census: 111,719

Zyuzino District (Russian: райо́н Зю́зино) is an administrative district (raion), one of the twelve in South-Western Administrative Okrug of the federal city of Moscow, Russia. As of the 2010 Census, the total population of the district was 123,003.

== Geography ==
The area of the district is 545.04 ha. The area of the housing stock is 2132.3 thousand m^{2} (2010). From the south, the district borders on the Bitsevsky Forest Park, and in the north, the Kotlovka River flows. The streets of the district are named after the cities of the Crimea and the Black Sea, as well as the Moscow metro stations located in the Zyuzino area - Nakhimovsky Prospekt, Sevastopolskaya, Kakhovskaya, and Zyuzino metro stations, (The Big Circle Line of the Moscow Metro was recently constructed here). There are three ponds on the territory of the district, one of which has natural banks. There are many squares, boulevards and alleys in the area. In 2014, Zyuzino Park was equipped as part of the city greening program, further enhancing the area as a green and relatively central place to live in the city, well connected to the city centre by a range of transportation options.

== Municipal status ==
As a municipal division, it is incorporated as Zyuzino Municipal Okrug.

== Transport ==
There are a range of transport options available in the Zyuzino District, including the Moscow Metro and tramway routes. The Serpukhovsko - Timiryazevskaya line, colloquially referred to as Grey Line, serves the district with two metro stations, including Sevastopolskaya and Nakhimovsky Prospekt. The Bolshaya Koltsevaya line, also known as the Big Circle Line, serves the district with two metro stations, including the Kakhovskaya and Zyuzino metro stations. Zyuzino also has a 24 - hour tramway connection to Moscow centre (Tram line 3) which runs from Tretyakovskaya metro to Bolotnikovskaya Street.

== See also ==
- Moscow children's ecological and biological center
