= Anděl (Prague Metro) =

Czech metro station

Coordinates: 50.074°N 14.405°E

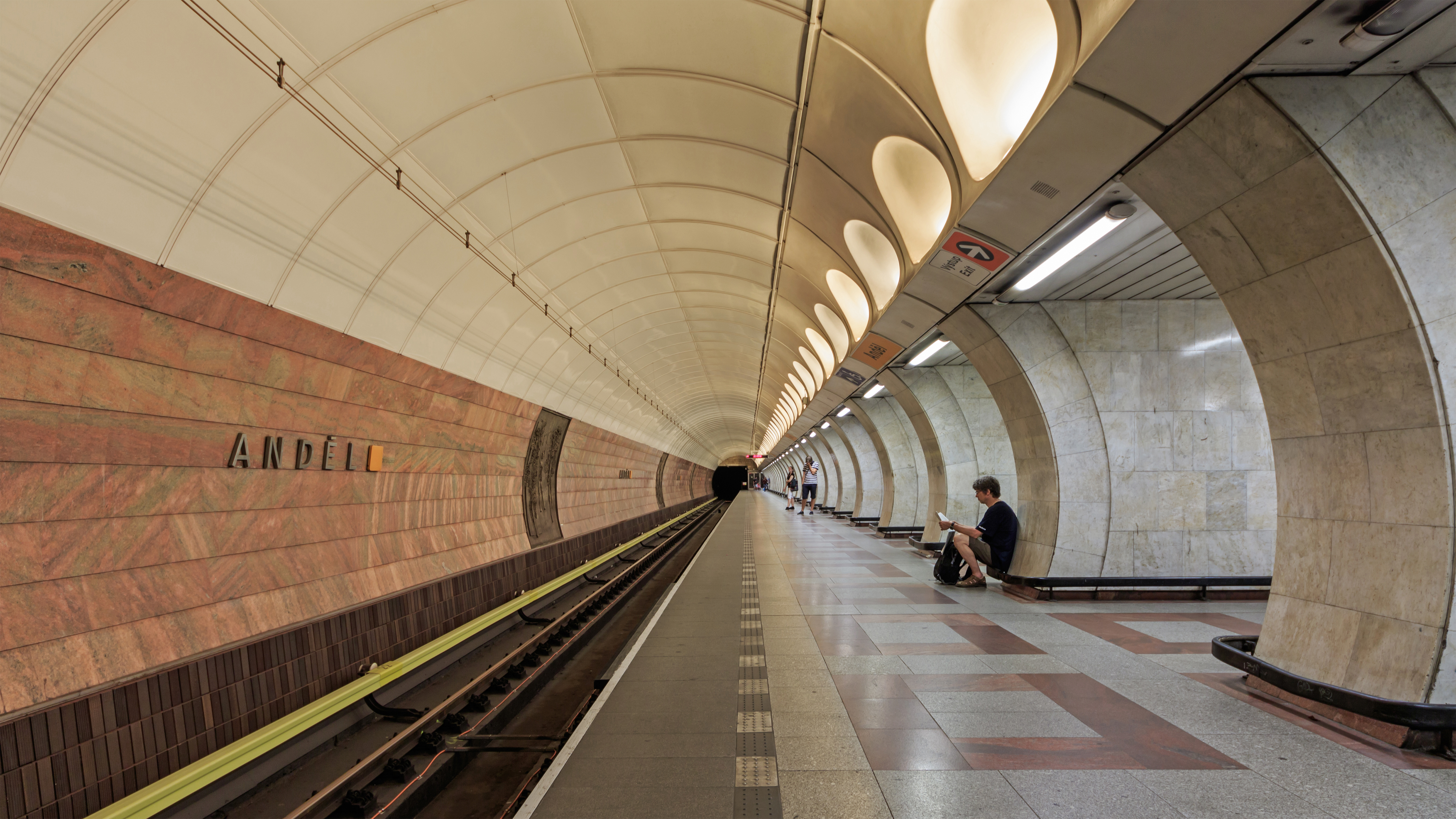

General information
- Location: Nádražní street Smíchov, Prague 5 Prague; Czech Republic
- System: Prague Metro
- Platforms: 1 island platform
- Tracks: 2

Construction
- Structure type: Underground
- Depth: 354 m (1,161 ft)
- Accessible: Yes

Other information
- Fare zone: PID: Prague

History
- Opened: 2 November 1985; 40 years ago

Services
Preceding station	Prague Metro	Following station
Smíchovské nádraží toward Zličín	Line B	Karlovo náměstí toward Černý Most
Location

Anděl (Czech pronunciation: [ˈʔanɟɛl], meaning "Angel") is a Prague Metro station on Line B, located in Smíchov, Prague 5. The station was built between 1977 and 1985, designed in the Soviet style, by Soviet architects and dedicated to the Czechoslovak–Soviet friendship. It was opened on 2 November 1985, as part of the inaugural section of Line B between Sokolovská and Smíchovské nádraží. The station was renamed in 1990 to Anděl, after the nearby Anděl neighborhood. At present it is one of the busiest stations on line B.

Its original name was Moskevská, after the city of Moscow. In the same year the Czechoslovak Metrostav designed the station Prazhskaya, named after Prague, it was opened on the Serpukhovsko-Timiryazevskaya Line of the Moscow Metro, which resembles the ceramic-tiled stations on the C line's Jižní Město segment. The Anděl station still contains one of the last pieces of art promoting Czechoslovak-Soviet friendship.

Anděl station has two exits, leading to the two underground vestibules. One vestibule is directly in the Anděl neighborhood, next to the shopping mall and the other is at "Na Knížecí", a large bus station serving as a terminus for local and intercity buses.

The station was renovated in 2015.

== Gallery ==
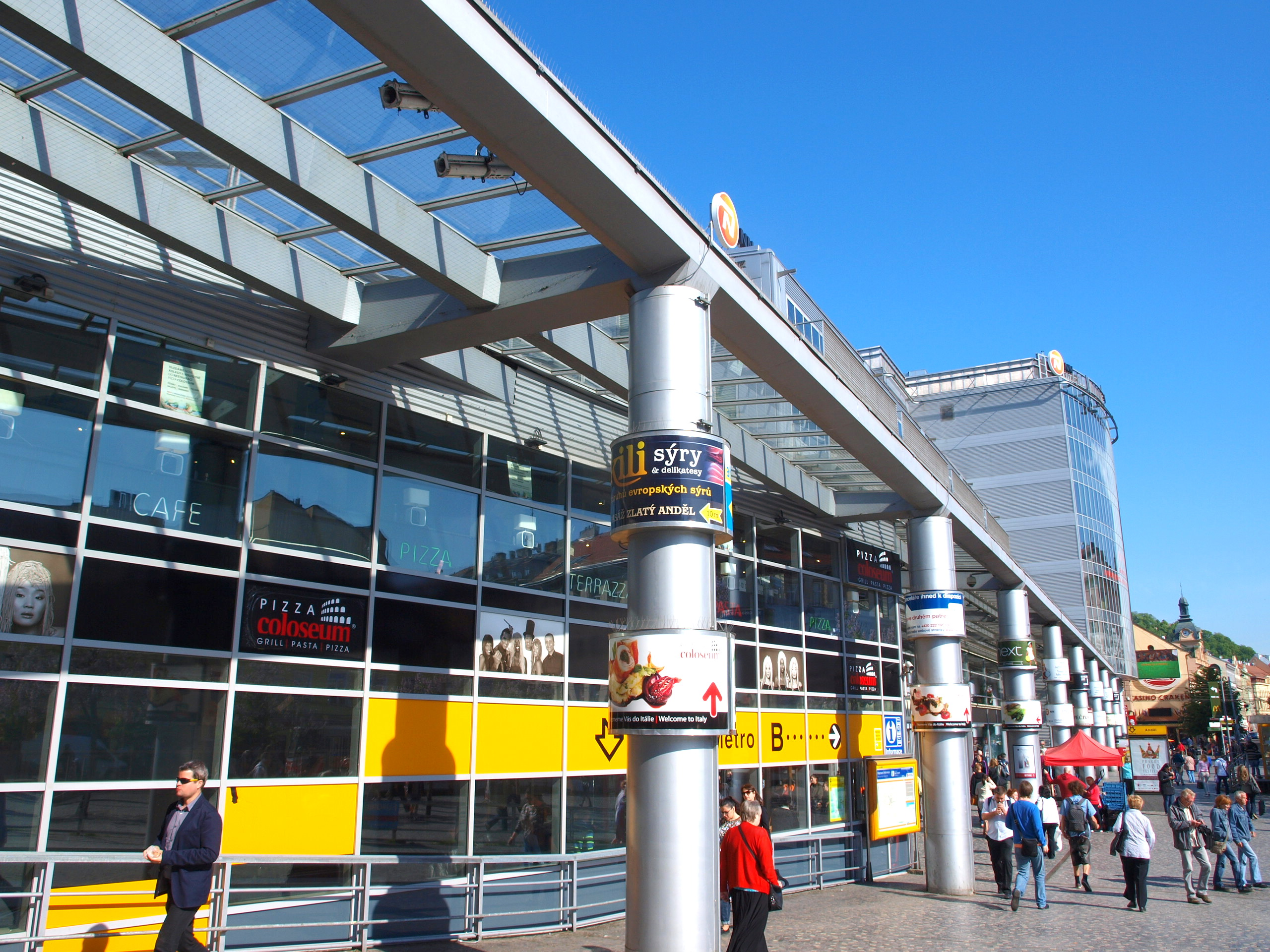
Entrance building

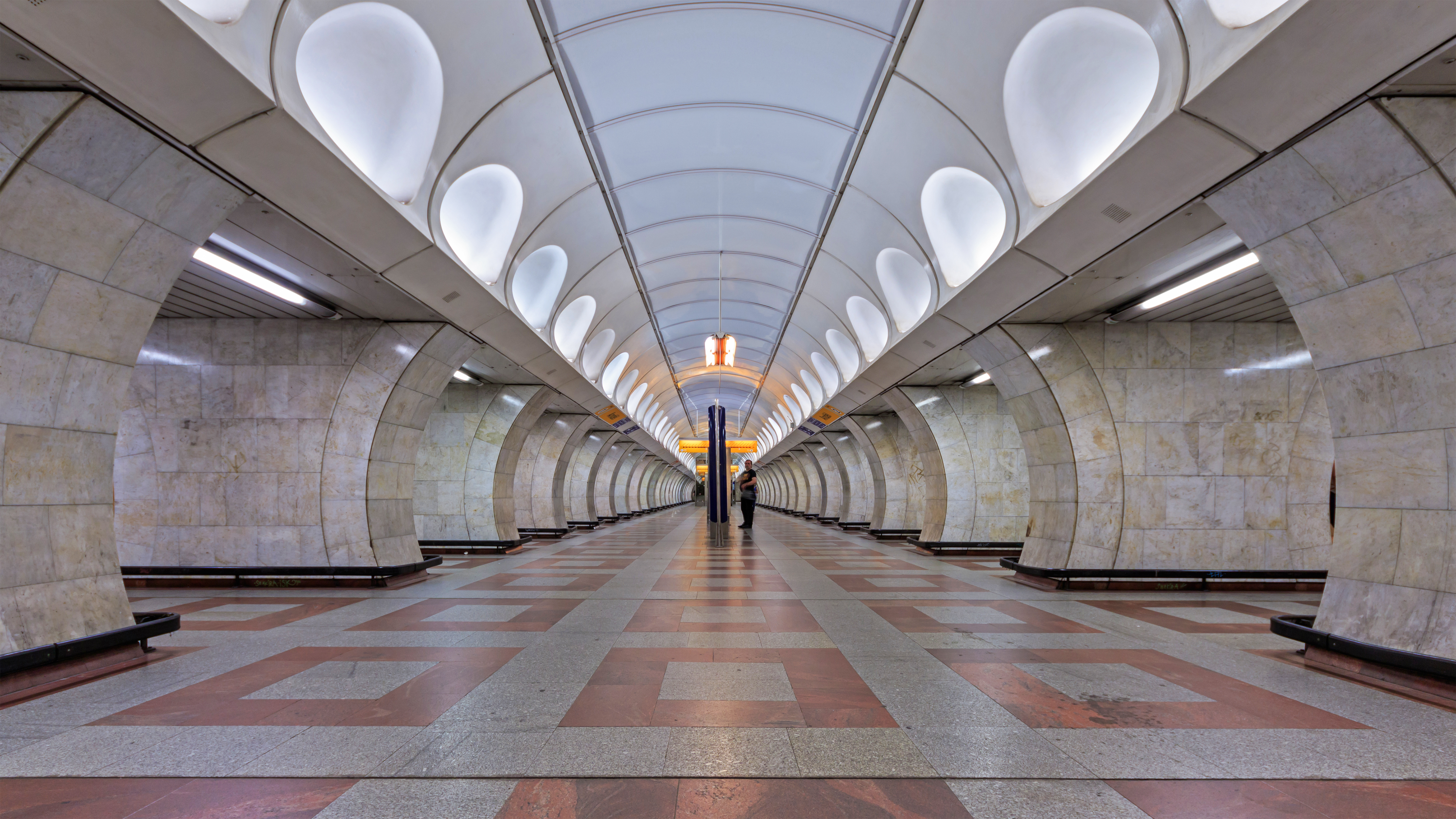
Platform hall

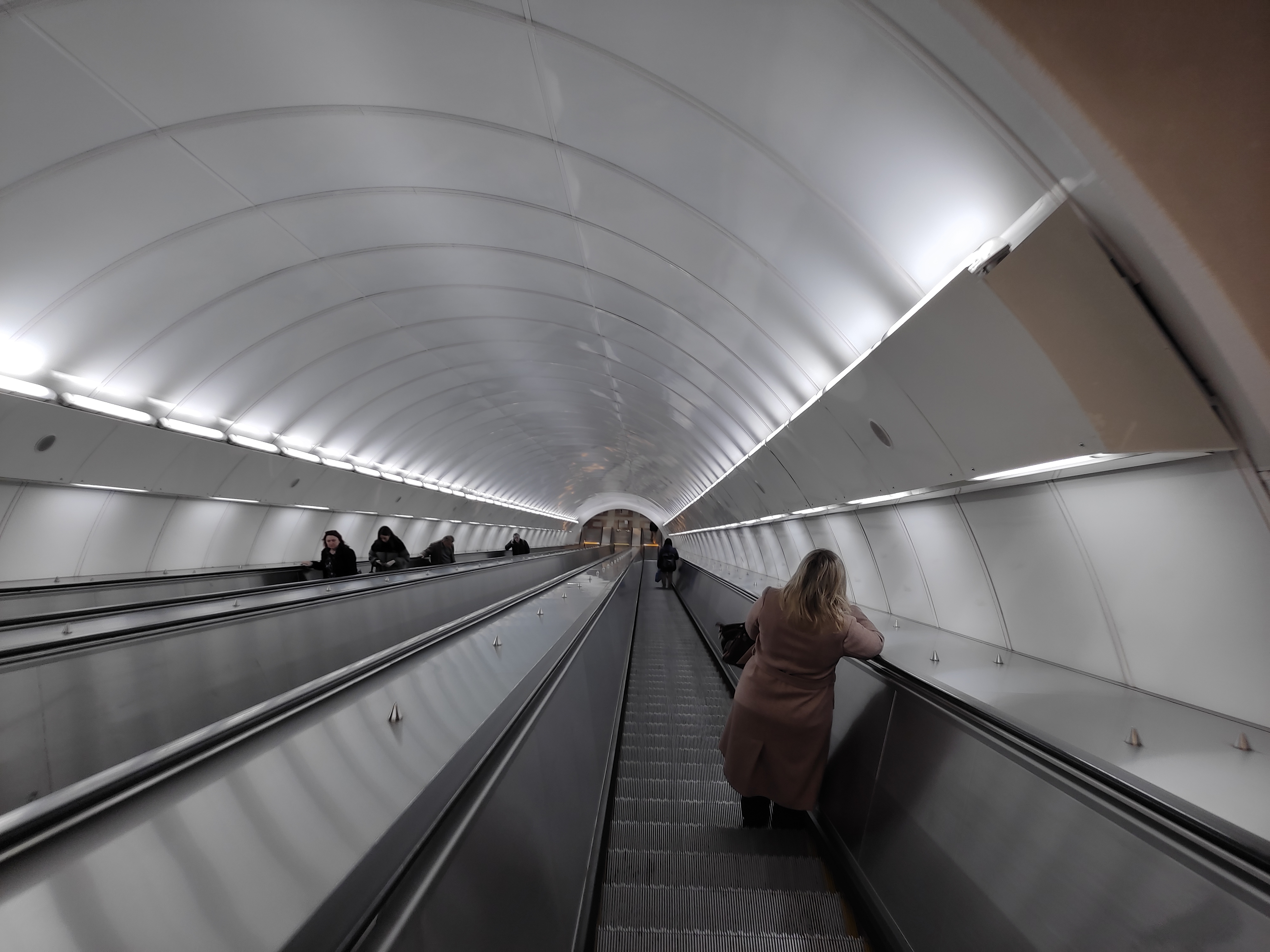
Escalators

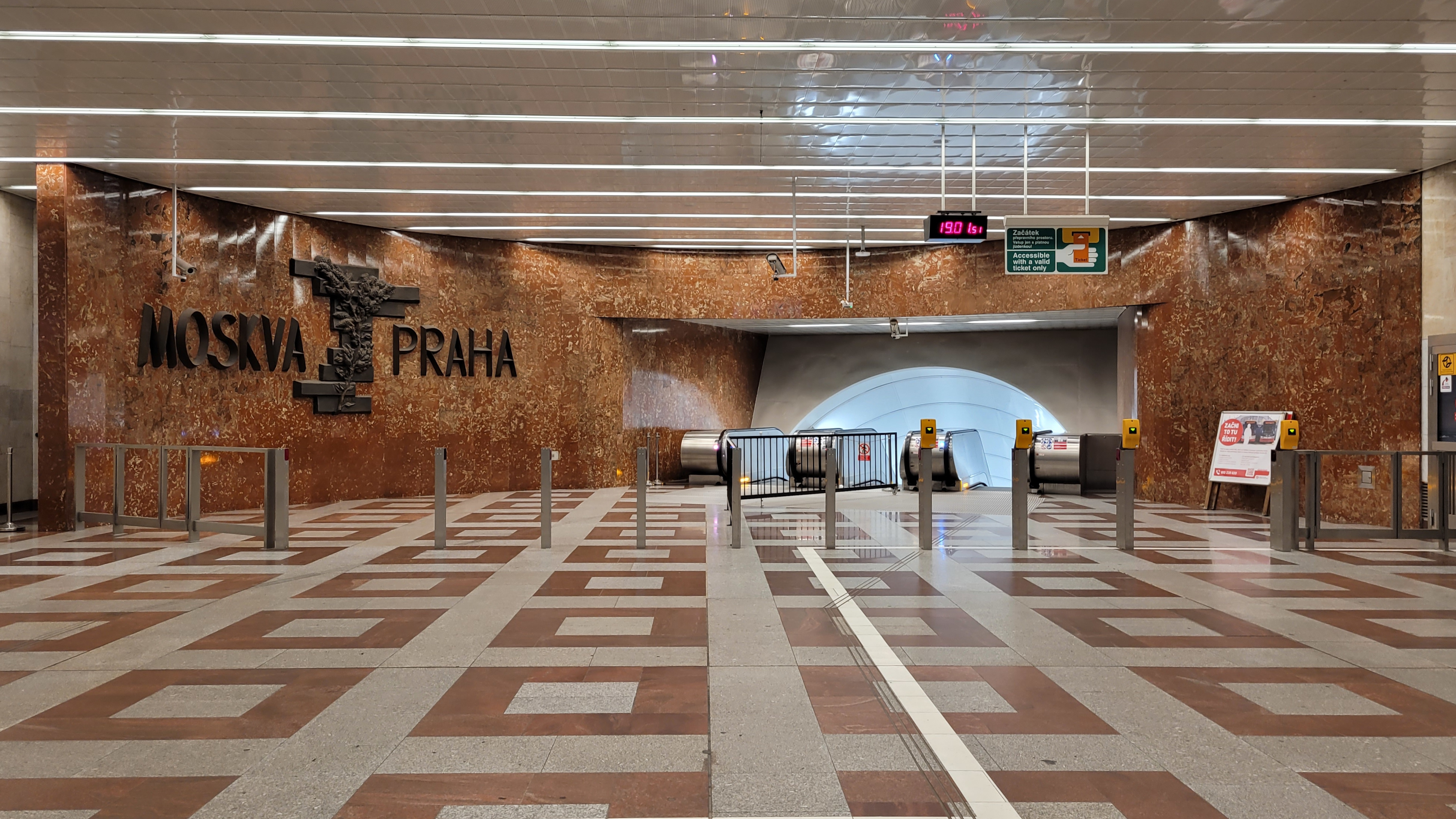
Southern vestibule with Moscow–Prague relief, referring to its former name

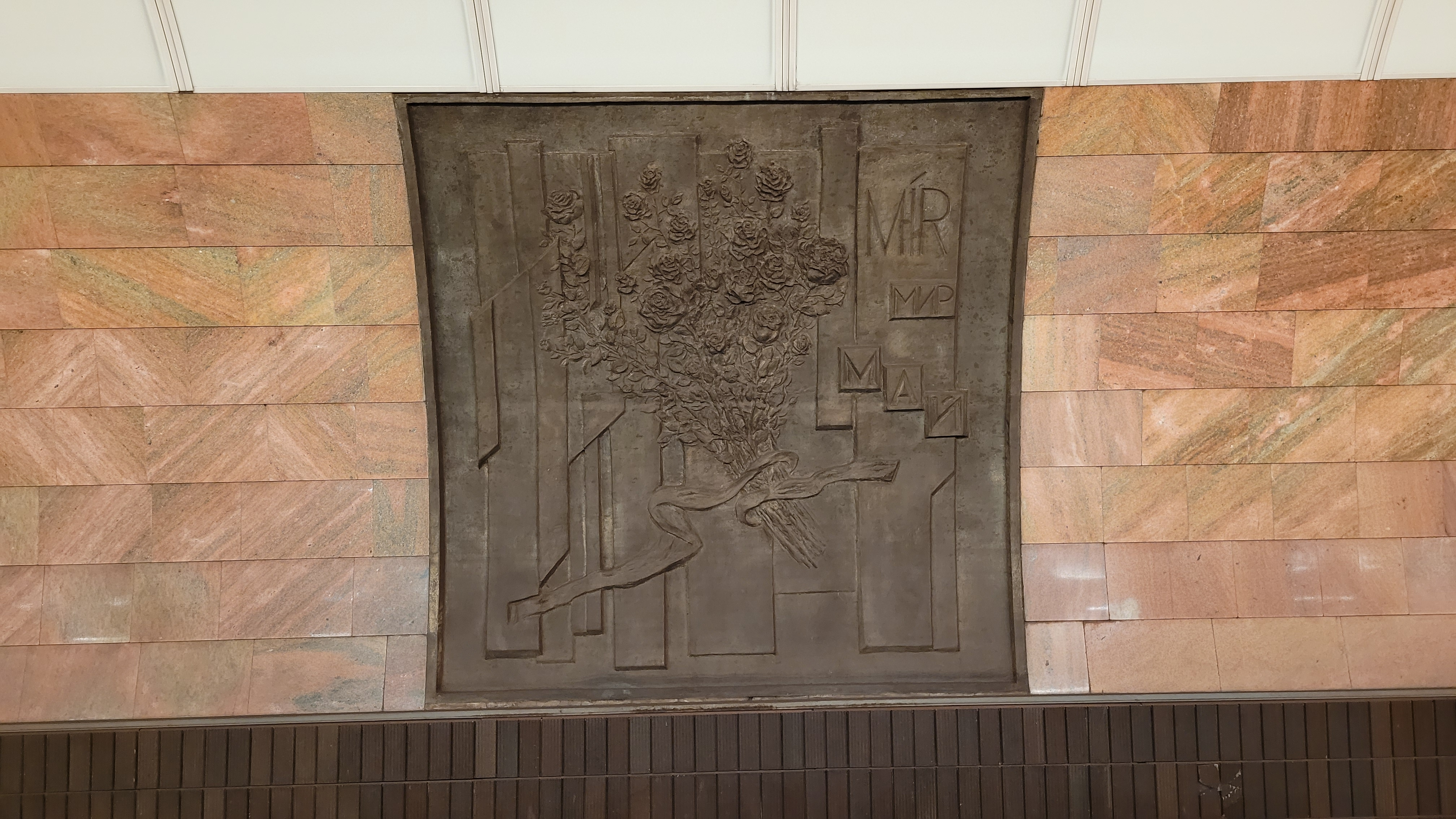
A relief in Anděl station
