= Nagornaya (Moscow Metro) =

Moscow Metro station

Nagornaya Нагорная
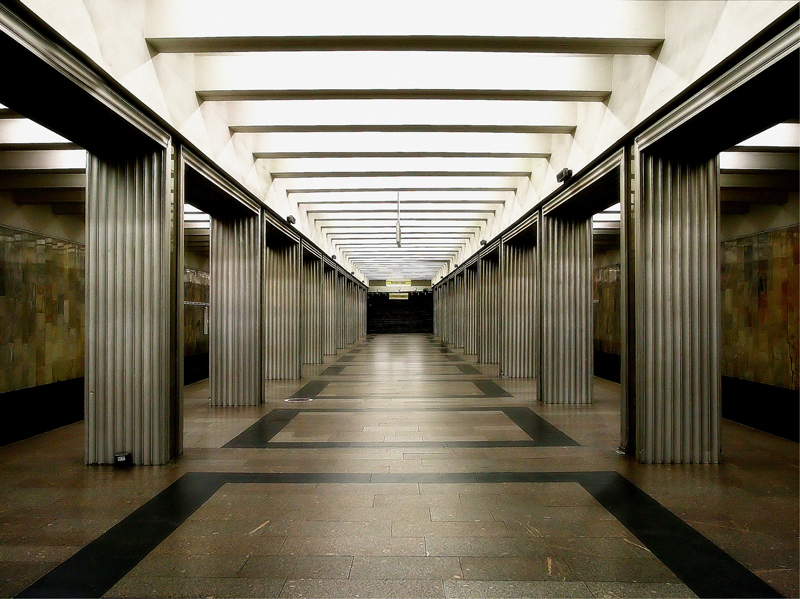

General information
- Location: Nagorny District; Southern Administrative Okrug; Moscow; Russia
- Coordinates: 55.6724°N 37.6104°E
- System: Moscow Metro station
- Owner: Moskovsky Metropoliten
- Line: Serpukhovsko-Timiryazevskaya line
- Platforms: 1
- Tracks: 2

Construction
- Depth: 9 metres (30 ft)
- Platform levels: 1
- Parking: No

Other information
- Station code: 145

History
- Opened: 8 November 1983; 42 years ago

Services
Preceding station	Moscow Metro	Following station
Nagatinskaya towards Altufyevo	Serpukhovsko-Timiryazevskaya line	Nakhimovsky Prospekt towards Bulvar Dmitriya Donskogo
Route map
Location
- Location within Moscow Metro

Nagornaya (Russian: Нагорная) is a Moscow Metro station on the Serpukhovsko-Timiryazevskaya Line dug at a depth of 9 meters, which handles about 17,200 people each day.

== Design ==
Between Nagornaya and Nagatinskaya stations there is a dead end spur between the tracks used for diversion of traffic in case of power failure and for technical vehicles traffic at night. Nagornaya was built according to the typical project of that times, with 26 columns in two rows at the distance 6.5 meters between columns.

== Exit ==
The exit to the city from Nagornaya is through an underground passage to the Electrolytnaya Passage and Krivoy Rog street.

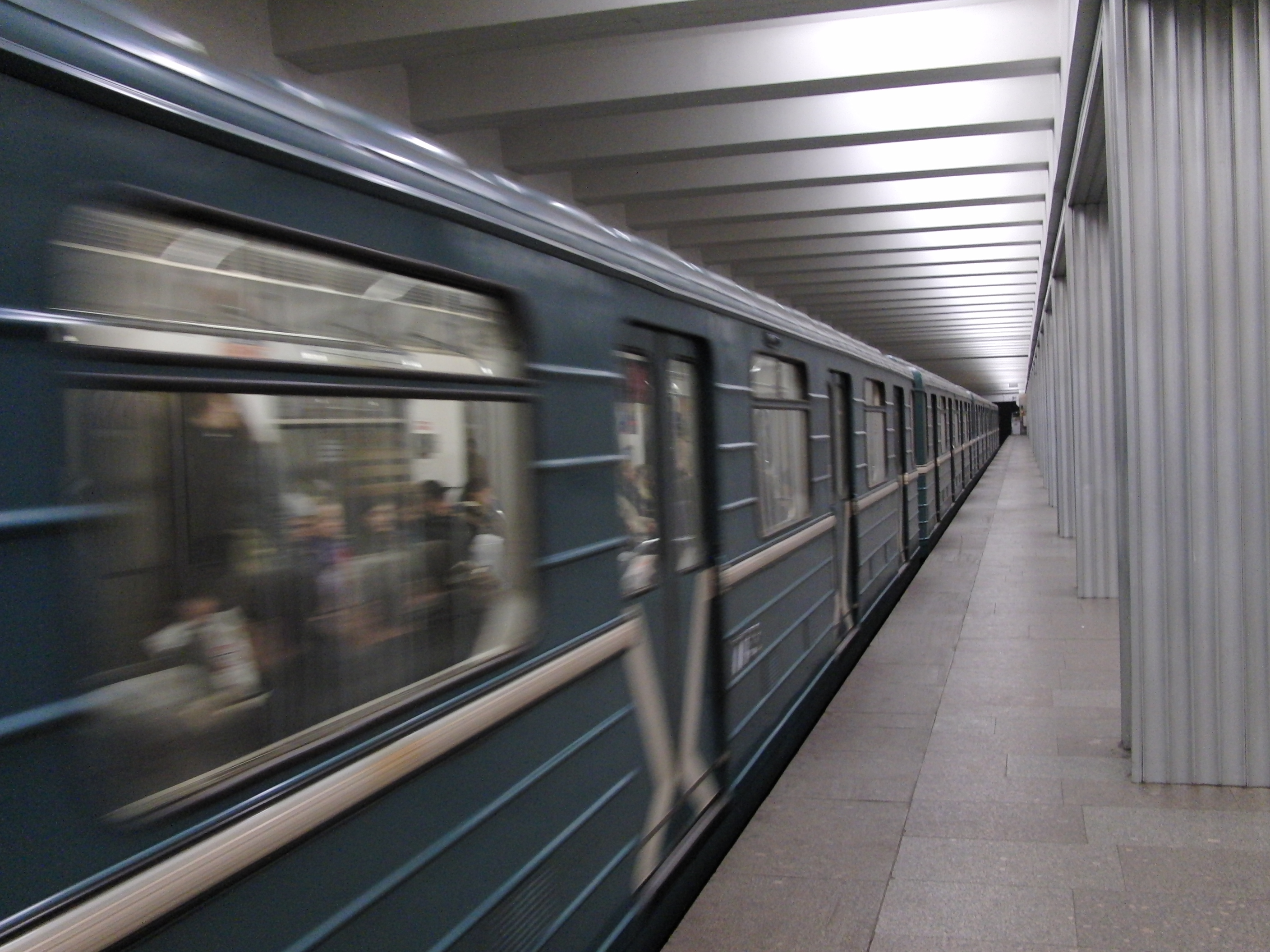
Train arriving on the platform
