= Nakhimovsky Prospekt (Moscow Metro) =

Moscow Metro station

Nakhimovsky Prospekt Нахимовский проспект
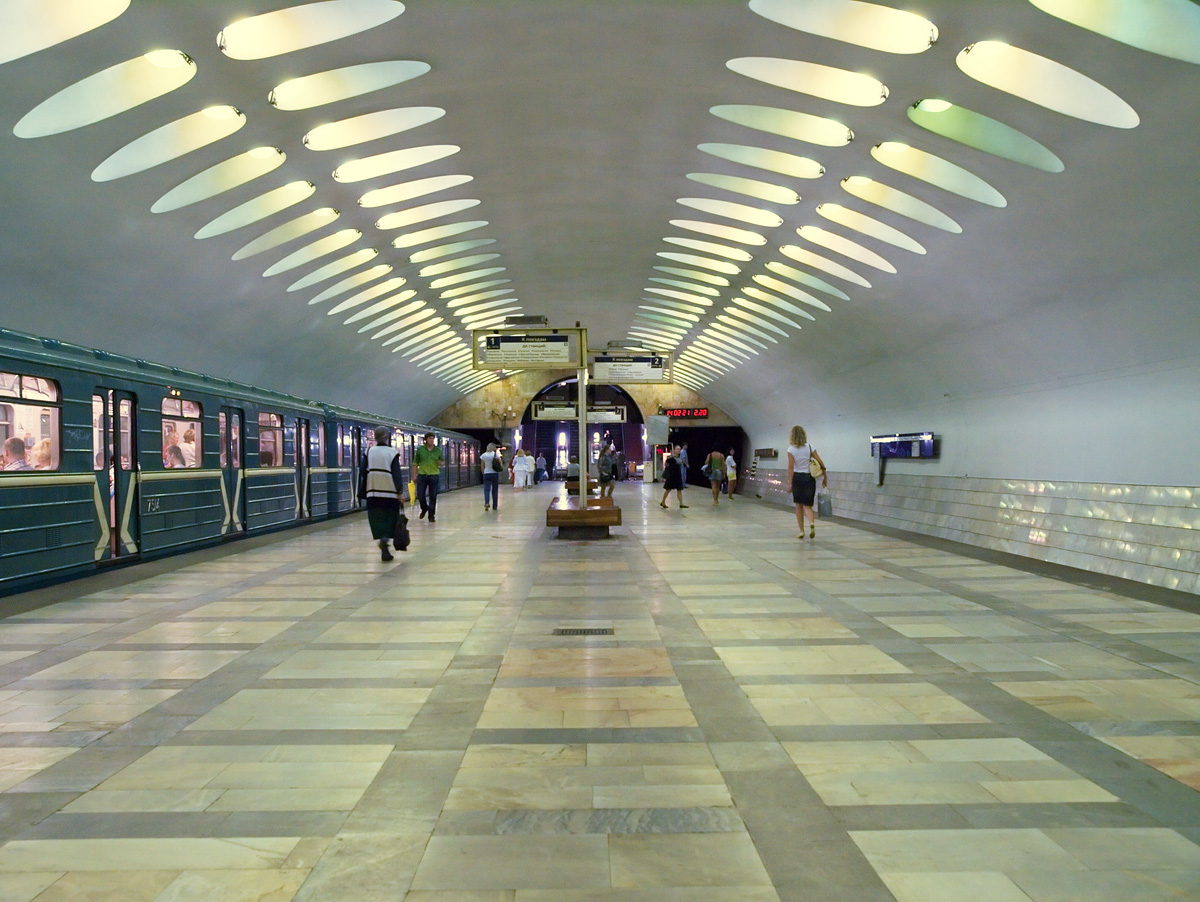

General information
- Location: Zyuzino District; South-Western Administrative Okrug; Moscow; Russia
- Coordinates: 55.6627°N 37.6055°E
- System: Moscow Metro station
- Owner: Moskovsky Metropoliten
- Line: Serpukhovsko-Timiryazevskaya line
- Platforms: 1 island platform
- Tracks: 2

Construction
- Structure type: shallow-level single-vault station
- Platform levels: 1
- Parking: No

Other information
- Station code: 146

History
- Opened: 8 November 1983; 42 years ago

Services
Preceding station	Moscow Metro	Following station
Nagornaya towards Altufyevo	Serpukhovsko-Timiryazevskaya line	Sevastopolskaya towards Bulvar Dmitriya Donskogo
Route map
Location
- Location within Moscow Metro

Nakhimovsky Prospekt (Russian: Нахимовский Проспект) is a station of Serpukhovsko-Timiryazevskaya Line of Moscow metro between Nagornaya and Sevastopolskaya. It was designed by V. S. Volovich, L. N. Popov, V. I. Klokov, and G. S. Mun.
