= Nagorny (surname) =

Nagorny, Nagornyi, Nagornyy or Nahorny (Russian: Нагорный, Ukrainian: Нагорний) is a Slavic masculine surname, its feminine counterpart is Nagornaya. It may refer to

- Aleksandr Nagorny (born 1982), Russian football manager and former player
- Nikita Nagornyy (born 1997), Russian gymnast
- Serhei Nahorny (born 1956), Soviet sprint canoeist
- Vitus Nagorny (born 1978), German football striker
- Yevgeny Nagorny (born 1972), Russian serial killer
