= Moscow children's ecological and biological center =

- Московский детский эколого-биологический центр
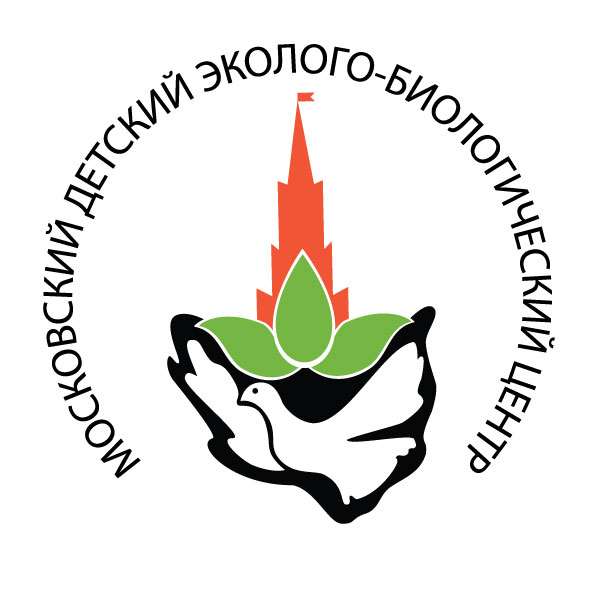
- MCEBC logo
- Abbreviation: MCEBC
- Formation: 1960s
- Type: state budgetary education institution
- Legal status: state
- Purpose: development of ecological culture of learning person through additional education (according to the statute)
- Headquarters: Moscow, Odesskaya st., 12A
- Region served: Moscow, Russia
- Fields: Ecology, Biology
- Official language: Russian
- Manager: D.V. Morgun
- Scientific director: G.A. Yagodin
- Parent organization: The Department of Education of Moscow
- Staff: 115 teachers
- Volunteers: about 3000 pupils
- Formerly called: Moscow City Station of Young Naturalists

Moscow children's ecological and biological center (MCEBC) (Russian: ГБОУ Московский детский эколого-биологический центр (МДЭБЦ) is a state budgetary institution of additional education for children in the field of ecological and biological education, promotion of environmental protection and a health promotion and the development of ecological culture. Parent organization is the Department of Education of Moscow. Previous name was the Moscow City Station of Young Naturalists (until 2008) (Russian: Московская городская станция юных натуралистов)

Scientific director is Gennadiy Alekseevich Yagodin, corresponding member of the Russian Academy of Sciences. Manager of MCEBC is Dmitriy Vladimirovich Morgun, Candidate of Biological Sciences, Candidate of Philosophical Sciences, docent. Last manager was V.A. Maslov (from 1982 to 2012). Staff of MCEBC consists of 115 teachers, many of them are lecturers of Moscow State University with academic degree.

== Activity ==
- The teachers read lectures, organize hands-on training and excursions in 5 educational programs: culturology, art aesthetics, ecological and biological, natural history, tourist and local history.
- Also there are authoring programs of MCEBC teachers: "Land and Sky" of I.N. Khodakova, "Palaeontology" of R.R. Gabdullin, "Basic Geology" of S.V. Filimonov, "Landscape Ecology" of A.N. Guseynov, "the Fundamentals of Biogeocenology" of I.M. Gerasimova and others.
- Every year MCEBC organize about 10 educational research expeditions in many regions of Russia, in Baltic states, Ukraine and Moldavia, in which about 1000 children take part.
- Realization of city ecological education actions.
- Providing of the Moscow stage of All-Russian Ecological and Biological Olympiad for children "Nature of Russia", All-Russian Competition of young environment researchers, Moscow Open Olympiad of geology (together with Institute of Geology of Moscow State University) and others.
- MCEBC is a local section of All-Russian children's ecological movement "Green Planet"
- Publication of manual editions

== Sections ==
- Biology Section
- Ecology Section
- Сreativity Laboratory
- Natural History and Local History Section
- Equestrian Club
- Socialization and Upbringing Section
- The Station of Young Naturalists is a branch with about 500 pupils. Address: Moscow, Yunnatov st. ("Young Naturalist's street"), 13, building 1. Manager of the branch is Danila Vladimirovich Sorokin

== Material resources ==
- Natural History Museum of Central Russia (since 1996) is a collection of palaeontological materials in Natural History and Local Lore Section.
- The Museum of Nature is a biological collection
- Mini-zoo (nature corner)
- Winter botanical garden
- Aquarian exposition
- Library with about 5000 items and digital library
- Computer room and digital biological laboratory
- In the Station of Young Naturalists (branch): winter greenhouse, orchard, mini-zoo, weather station, entomological collection.
