= Bibirevo (Moscow Metro) =

Moscow Metro station

Bibirevo Бибирево
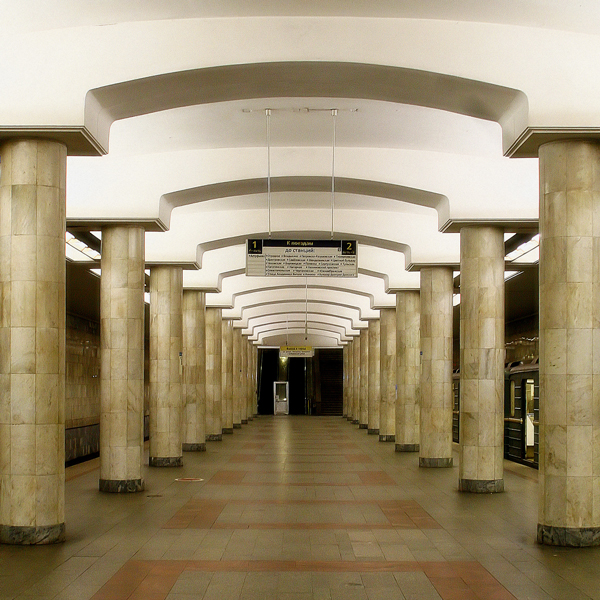

General information
- Location: Bibirevo District; North-Eastern Administrative Okrug; Moscow; Russia
- Coordinates: 55.8838°N 37.6034°E
- System: Moscow Metro station
- Owner: Moskovsky Metropoliten
- Line: Serpukhovsko-Timiryazevskaya line
- Platforms: 1 island platform
- Tracks: 2
- Connections: Trolleybus: А 31, 53, 92, 278, 282, 290, 618, 637, 705, 771

Construction
- Structure type: pylon tri-vault
- Platform levels: 1
- Parking: No

Other information
- Station code: 130

History
- Opened: 31 December 1992; 33 years ago

Services
Preceding station	Moscow Metro	Following station
Altufyevo Terminus	Serpukhovsko-Timiryazevskaya line	Otradnoye towards Bulvar Dmitriya Donskogo
Route map
Location
- Location within Moscow Metro

Bibirevo (Russian: Бибирево) is a station on the Serpukhovsko-Timiryazevskaya Line of the Moscow Metro. It opened on 31 December 1992, when the line was extended 2.6 kilometres (1.6 mi) north from Otradnoye. Bibirevo served as the northern terminus of the line until the 2-kilometre (1.2 mi) extension to Altufyevo opened on 15 July 1994.

The station is a shallow three-span column design, at a depth of 9.5 metres (31 ft). It was constructed to a modified standard design using prefabricated reinforced-concrete components.
