= Aleksandr Nagorny =

Russian footballer and manager

Personal information
- Full name: Aleksandr Vladimirovich Nagorny
- Date of birth: 11 September 1982 (age 44)
- Place of birth: Komsomolsky, Russian SFSR
- Position: Midfielder

Team information
- Current team: Ural Yekaterinburg (assistant coach)

Senior career*
Years	Team	Apps	(Gls)
1999	FC Bataysk		
2000	FC Rostselmash-3 Rostov-on-Don		
2004	FC Progress Rostov-on-Don		
2005	FC Biolog-Novokubansk (amateur)		
2006	FC Azov-Don Azov		
2007	FC Zernograd		

Managerial career
- 2010–2016: FC Krasnodar (academy)
- 2016–2017: FC Krasnodar-2 (assistant)
- 2017–2018: FC Krasnodar-2
- 2018–2019: FC Krasnodar-2
- 2019–2020: FC Krasnodar (academy)
- 2021–2022: FC Ufa (assistant)
- 2022–2023: Rotor Volgograd (assistant)
- 2024–2025: Sabah (assistant)
- 2026–: Ural Yekaterinburg (assistant)
- * Club domestic league appearances and goals

Aleksandr Vladimirovich Nagorny (Russian: Александр Владимирович Нагорный; born 11 September 1982) is a Russian football manager and a former player. He is an assistant coach for Ural Yekaterinburg.

== Career ==
On November 27, 2024, it was announced that he was appointed as an assistant coach alongside Vasili Berezutski at Sabah.
