= Otradnoye District =

Otradnoye District Отрадное
- District
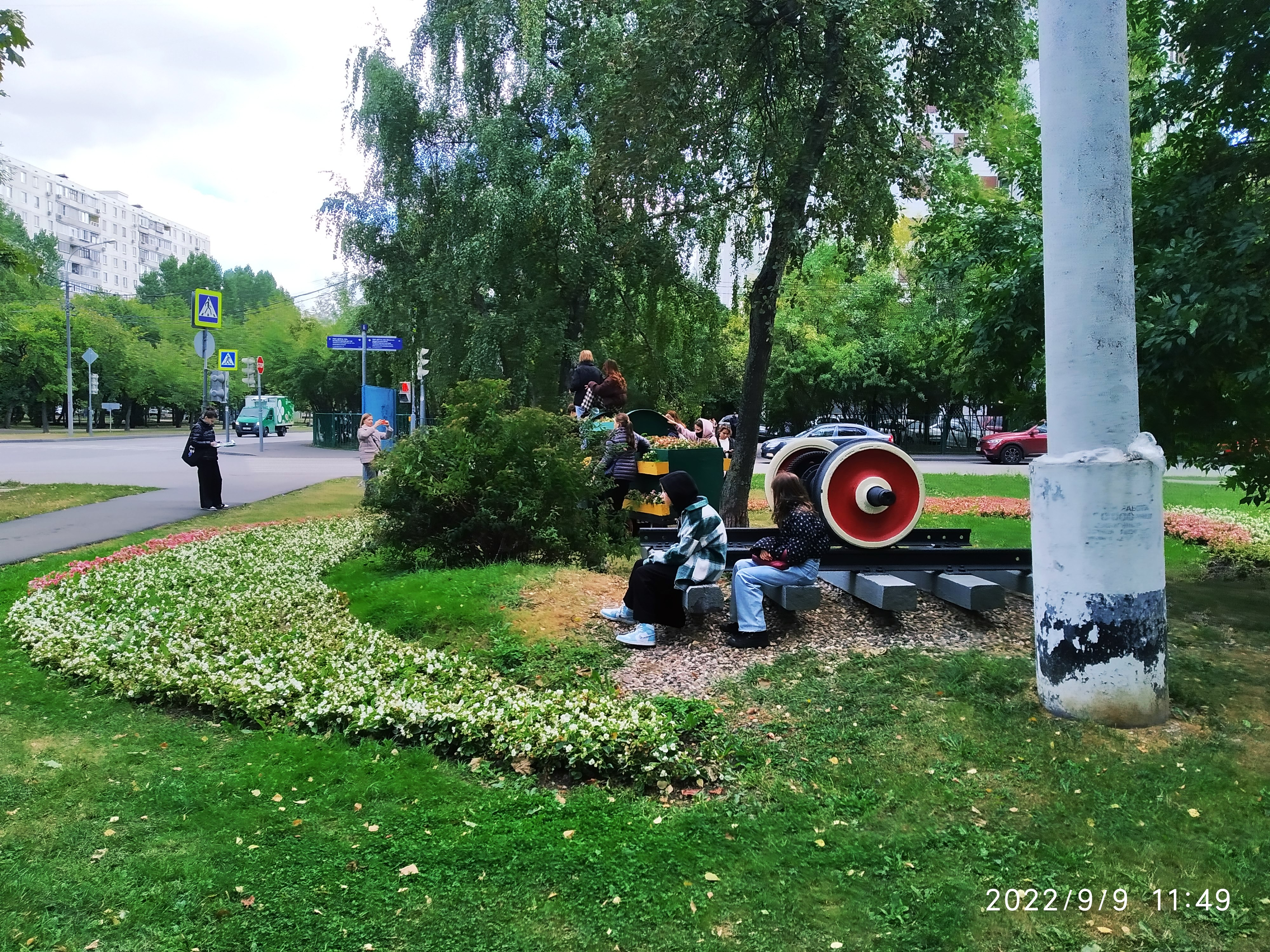

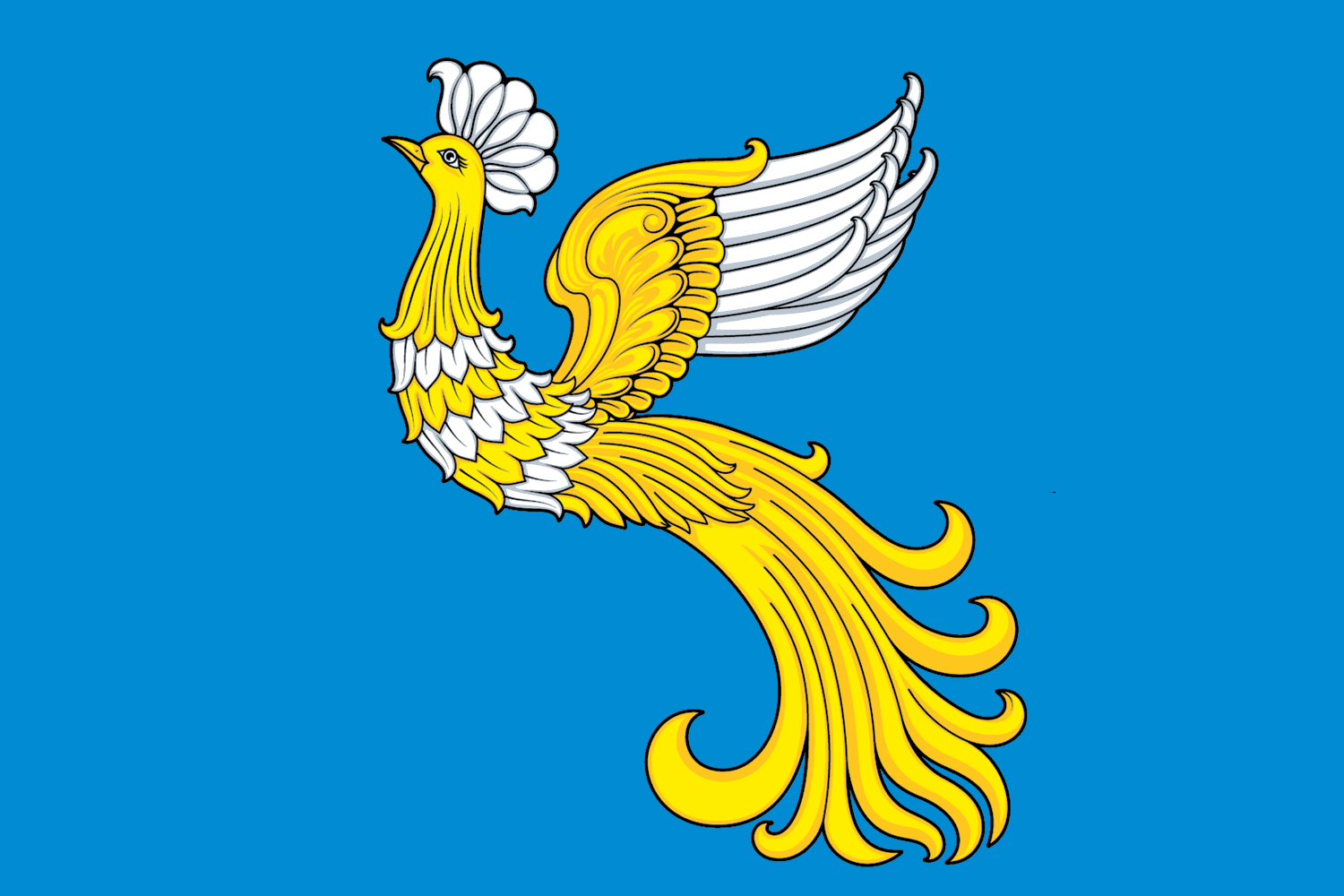
- Flag Coat of arms
- Location of Otradnoye District on the map of Moscow
- Coordinates: 55°51′37″N 37°36′08″E
- Country: Russia
- Federal subject: Moscow
- Time zone: UTC+3 (MSK)
- OKTMO ID: 45359000
- Website: http://otradnoe.mos.ru/

Otradnoye District (Russian: райо́н Отра́дное) is an administrative district (raion) of North-Eastern Administrative Okrug, and one of the 125 raions of Moscow, Russia. The area of the district is 10.16 square kilometers (3.92 sq mi).

== History ==
The territory of the modern Otradnoye District was once home to several settlements, the largest of which was the village of Vladykino. To the north of Vladykino lay the village of Slobodka, and to the east of Slobodka was the village of Kozeyevo. Otradnoye is mentioned in the first comprehensive reconstruction plan for Moscow, approved on July 10, 1935, by Decree No. 1435 of the Central Committee of the Communist Party and the Council of People's Commissars of the USSR "On the General Plan for the Reconstruction of the City of Moscow" (architects V. N. Semyonov and S. E. Chernyshev)[3]. The plan envisioned the inclusion of Otradnoye within Moscow's boundaries. However, the area that would become Otradnoye was officially incorporated into Moscow only after the construction of the Moscow Ring Road (MKAD) in 1960.

=== Modern History of the District ===
In 1974, large-scale construction of multi-story residential buildings began, transforming Otradnoye into a typical bedroom community. In 1975, to mark the 150th anniversary of the Decembrist uprising, several streets in Otradnoye were named after prominent figures of the movement, including Pestel, Bestuzhev, and Yakushkin. The central street of the district is Dekabristov Street. The area was divided by a railway line running parallel to Dekabristov Street, stretching from the Institute of Transport in Sviblovo to the Beskudnikovo station. The railway was dismantled in the late 1980s to make way for the construction of the Otradnoye metro station and new residential buildings on the even-numbered side of Dekabristov Street.

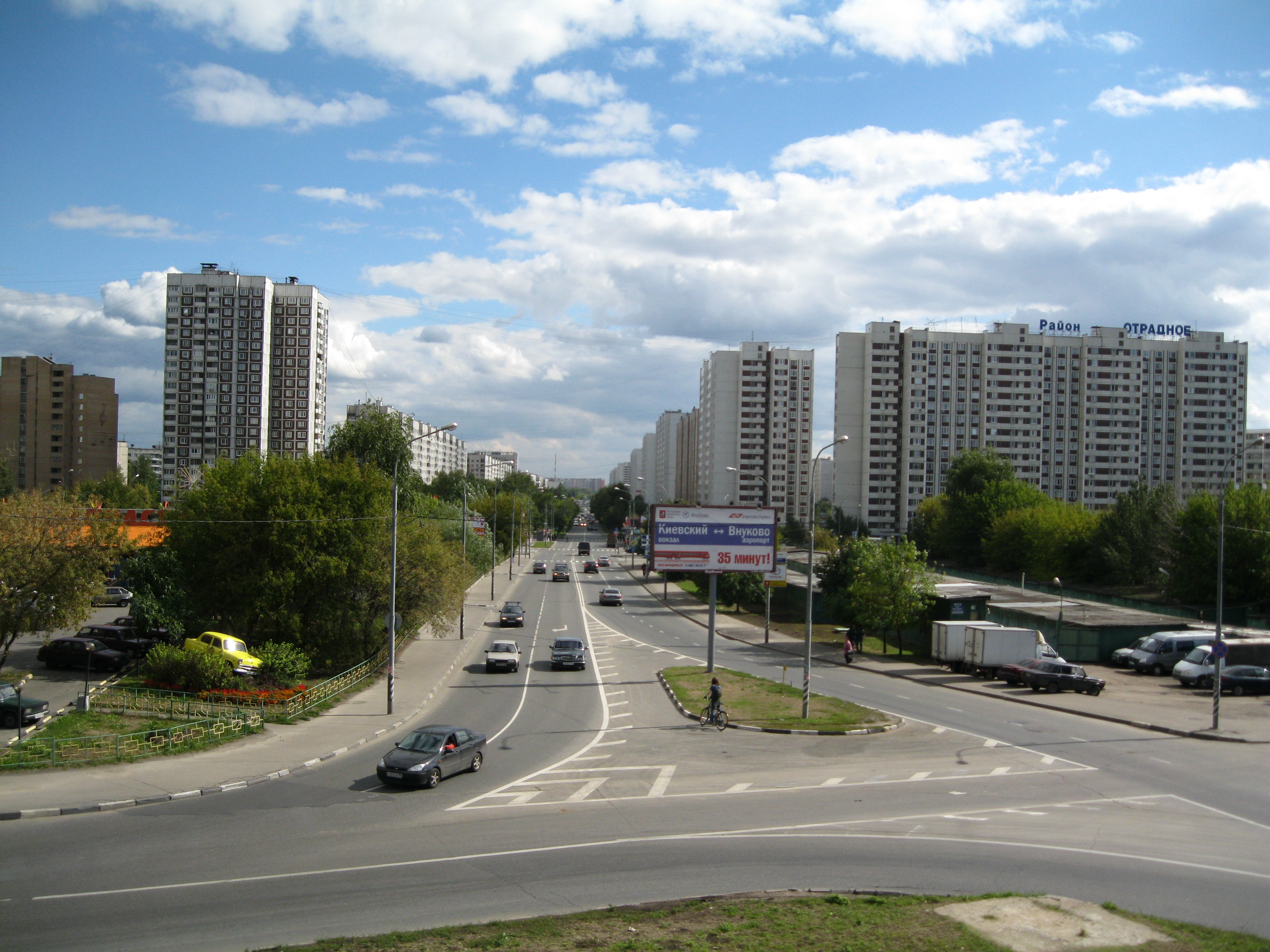
Dekabristov street, Otradnoe, Moscow

The last remaining wooden private houses of the former village of Vladykino, located at the beginning of Altufyevskoye Highway on its odd-numbered side, were demolished (some had burned down) in 1980. In their place, 12- and 16-story panel buildings were constructed as family dormitories for the Moscow City Police Department. The former village and its vanished streets were commemorated by bus stops named "Novovladykino" and "Vychegodskaya Street," which were renamed in the late 1980s to "Hotel Voshod" and "Altufyevskoye Highway, 12," respectively.

The district's name derives from the Otradnoye educational farm and state farm of the Timiryazev Agricultural Academy, located on the northern bank of the Likhoborka River. This state farm is marked on the 1931 "Map of the Environs of Moscow". The southern part of the future Otradnoye district was occupied by a vast apple orchard belonging to the state farm. In the early 1980s, the orchard was cleared, and in its place, the streets of Khachaturian, Kargopolskaya, and Sannikov were laid out, where multi-story panel buildings were constructed. Remnants of the apple orchard can still be found in some courtyards along Otradnaya Street and Khachaturian Street, near the beginning of Dekabristov Street, and around the MIT territory. Partial remains of the poplar alleys that once bordered the orchard have also been preserved. The district also housed the Otradnoye educational and experimental farm near Signalny Proyezd.

To serve low-income residents, the Otradnoye Social Service Center and the Municipal Department of Social Welfare operate in the district.

In terms of population, Otradnoye ranks fourth among Moscow's districts. As part of efforts to preserve Russian cultural traditions, Otradnoye maintains and develops ties with its sister city, Kargopol in the Arkhangelsk region, hosting creative groups from the region and organizing exhibitions of folk craft artists. On Kargopolskaya Street, master craftsmen of wooden architecture have built a wooden church dedicated to St. Nicholas.

According to Greenpeace, residents of Otradnoye are exposed to harmful emissions from the waste incineration plant (Special Plant No. 2) located at 33a Altufyevskoye Highway, near the district's border. However, former Moscow Mayor Yuri Luzhkov claimed that the city's waste incineration plants posed no danger to residents.

The district is served by two metro stations ("Otradnoye" and "Vladykino"), a stadium, and five fountains

== Education ==
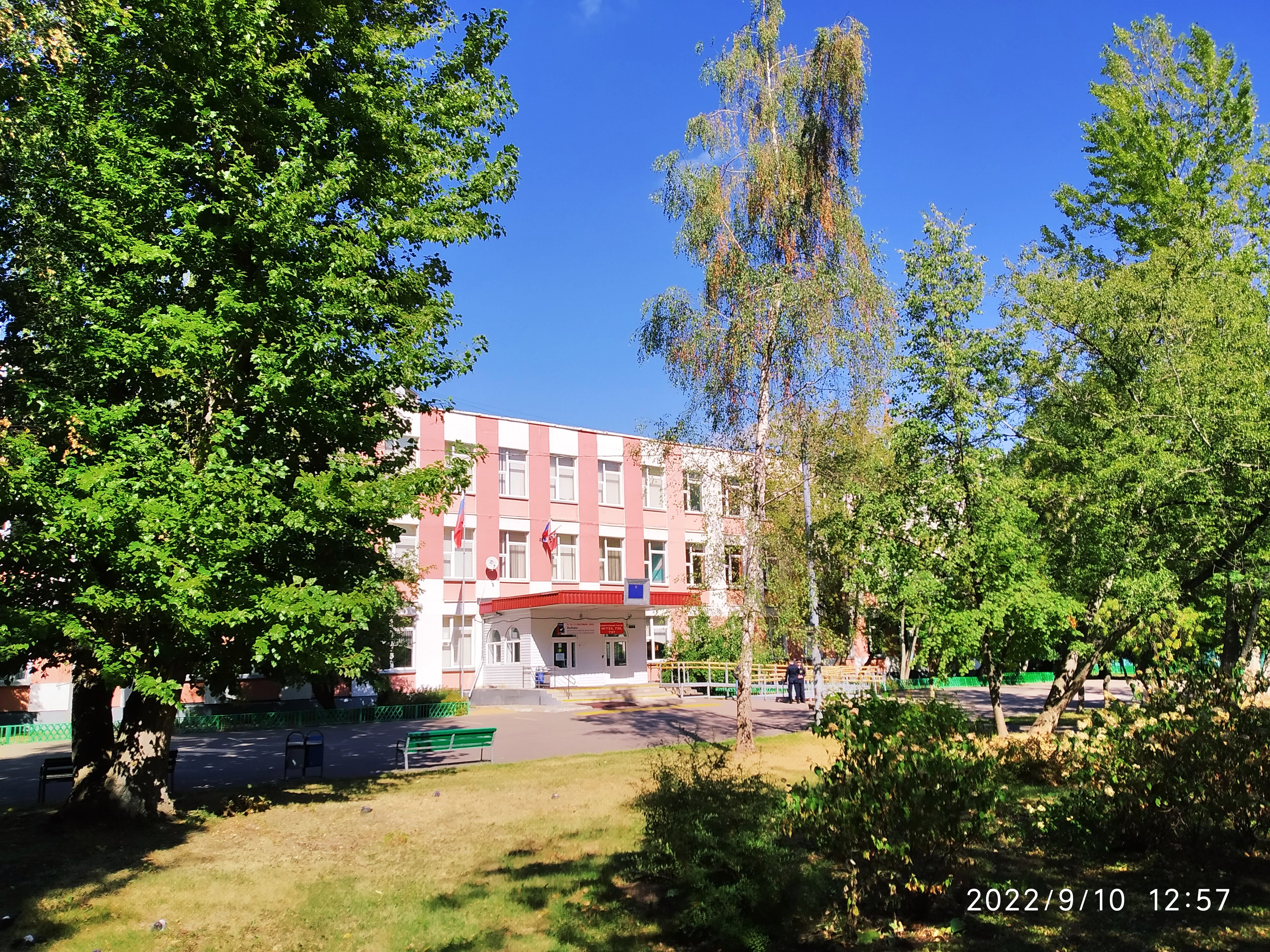
Former School No. 263

22 comprehensive secondary schools are located in this district, including School No. 263.

== See also ==
- Administrative divisions of Moscow
