= Chertanovo Severnoye District =

Chertanovo Severnoye District Район Чертаново Северное (Russian)
- District
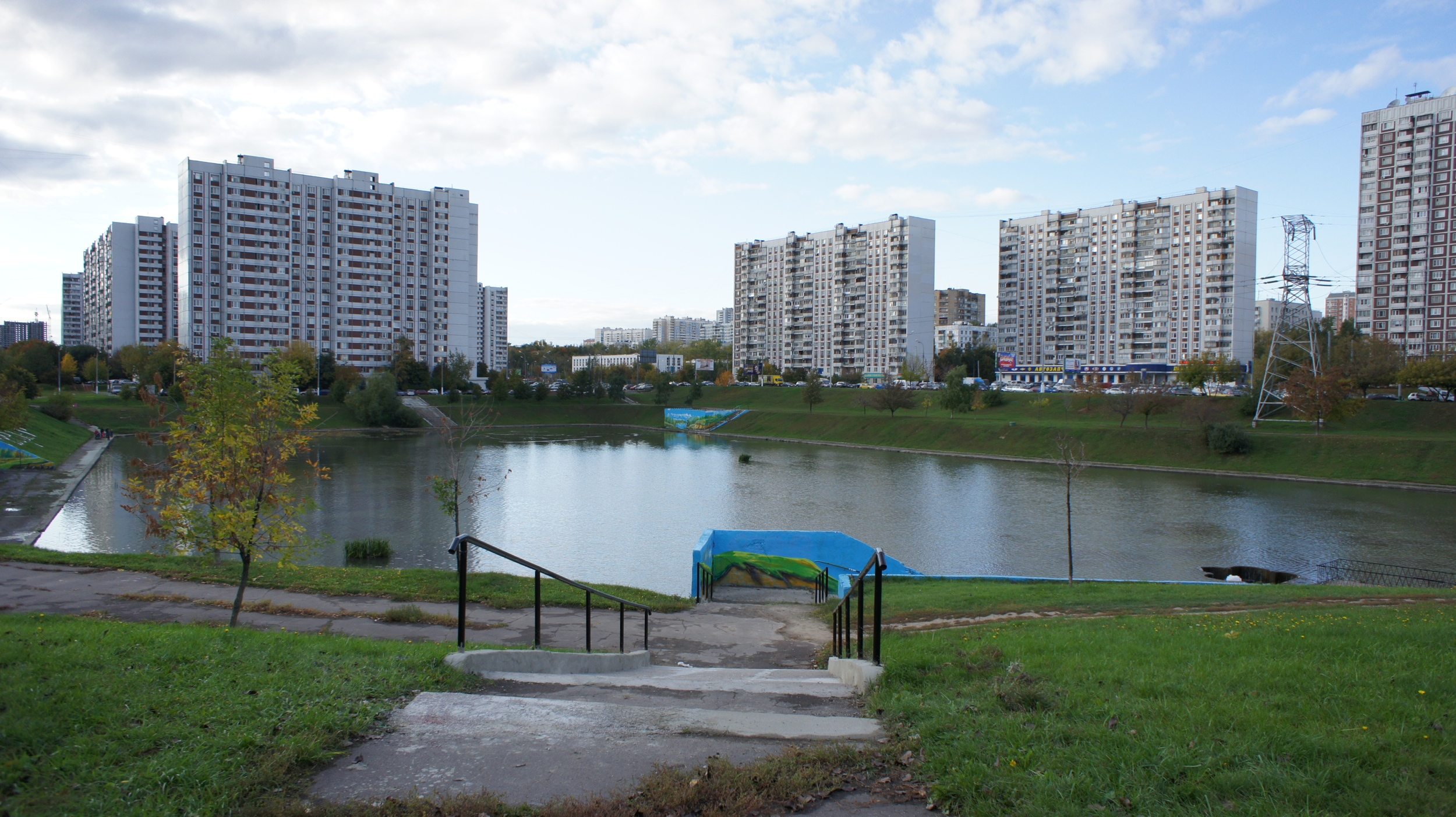
- Settling pond of Chertanovo River, Chertanovo Severnoye District

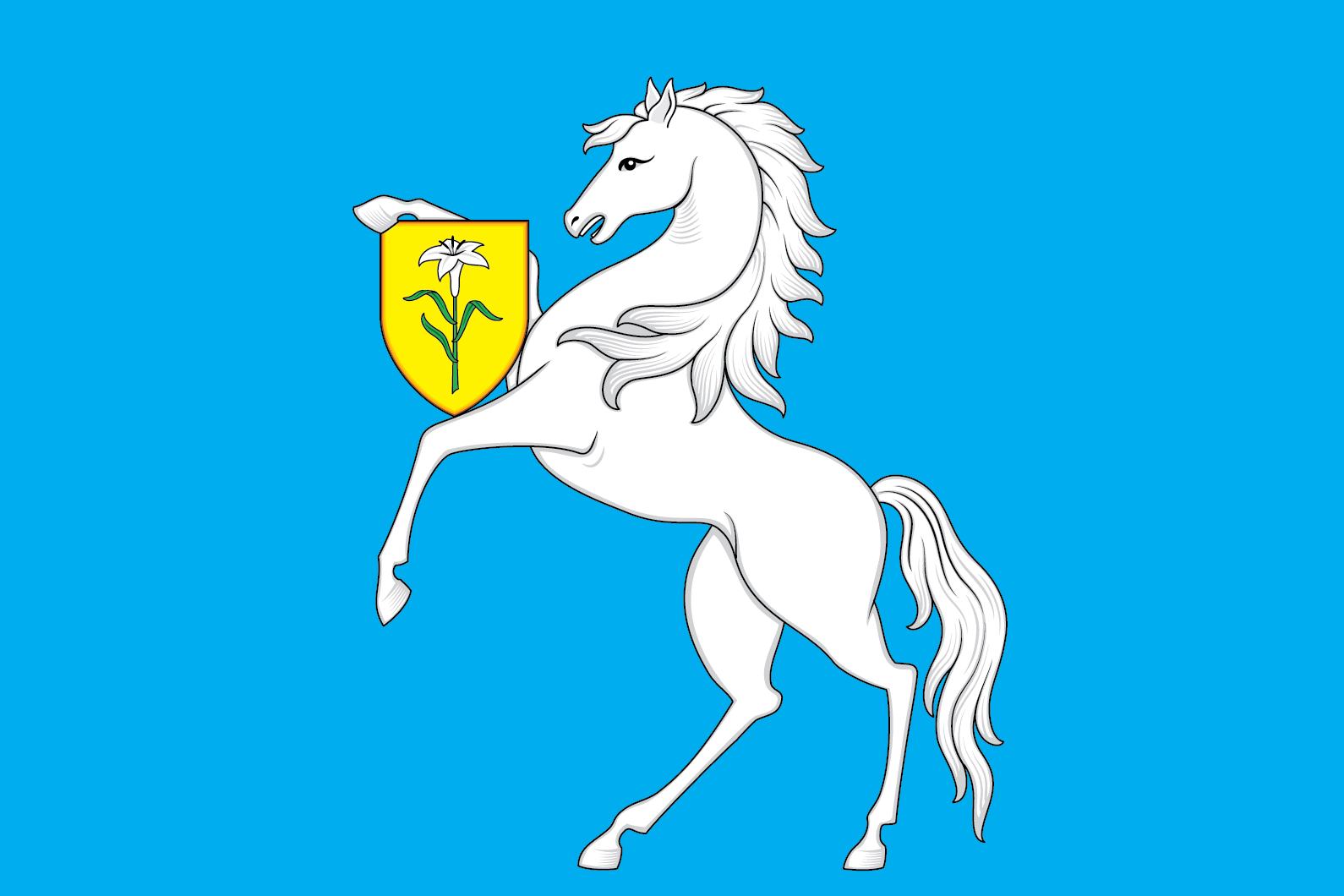
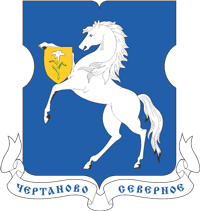
- Flag Coat of arms
- Location of Chertanovo Severnoye District in the federal city of Moscow (pre-2012 map)
- Coordinates: 55°38′N 37°36′E
- Country: Russia
- Federal subject: Federal city of Moscow
- Established: October 15, 2003

Area
  - Total: 5.4015 km^{2} (2.0855 sq mi)

Population (2010 Census)
  - Total: 111,875
  - Estimate (January 2013): 113,504
  - Density: 20,712/km^{2} (53,643/sq mi)

Municipal structure
  - Municipally incorporated as: Chertanovo Severnoye Municipal Okrug
- Time zone: UTC+
- OKTMO ID: 45924000
- Website: http://chertanovo-severnoe.mos.ru

Population of Chertanovo Severnoye District
- 2010 Census: 111,875
- 2002 Census: 104,613

Chertanovo Severnoye District (Russian: райо́н Черта́ново Се́верное) is a territorial division (a district, or raion) in Southern Administrative Okrug, one of the 125 in the federal city of Moscow, Russia. It is located in the south of the federal city. The area of the district is 5.4015 square kilometers (2.0855 sq mi). As of the 2010 Census, the total population of the district was 111,875.

== Municipal status ==
As a municipal division, the district is incorporated as Chertanovo Severnoye Municipal Okrug.
