= Altufyevo (Moscow Metro) =

Moscow Metro station

Altufyevo Алтуфьево
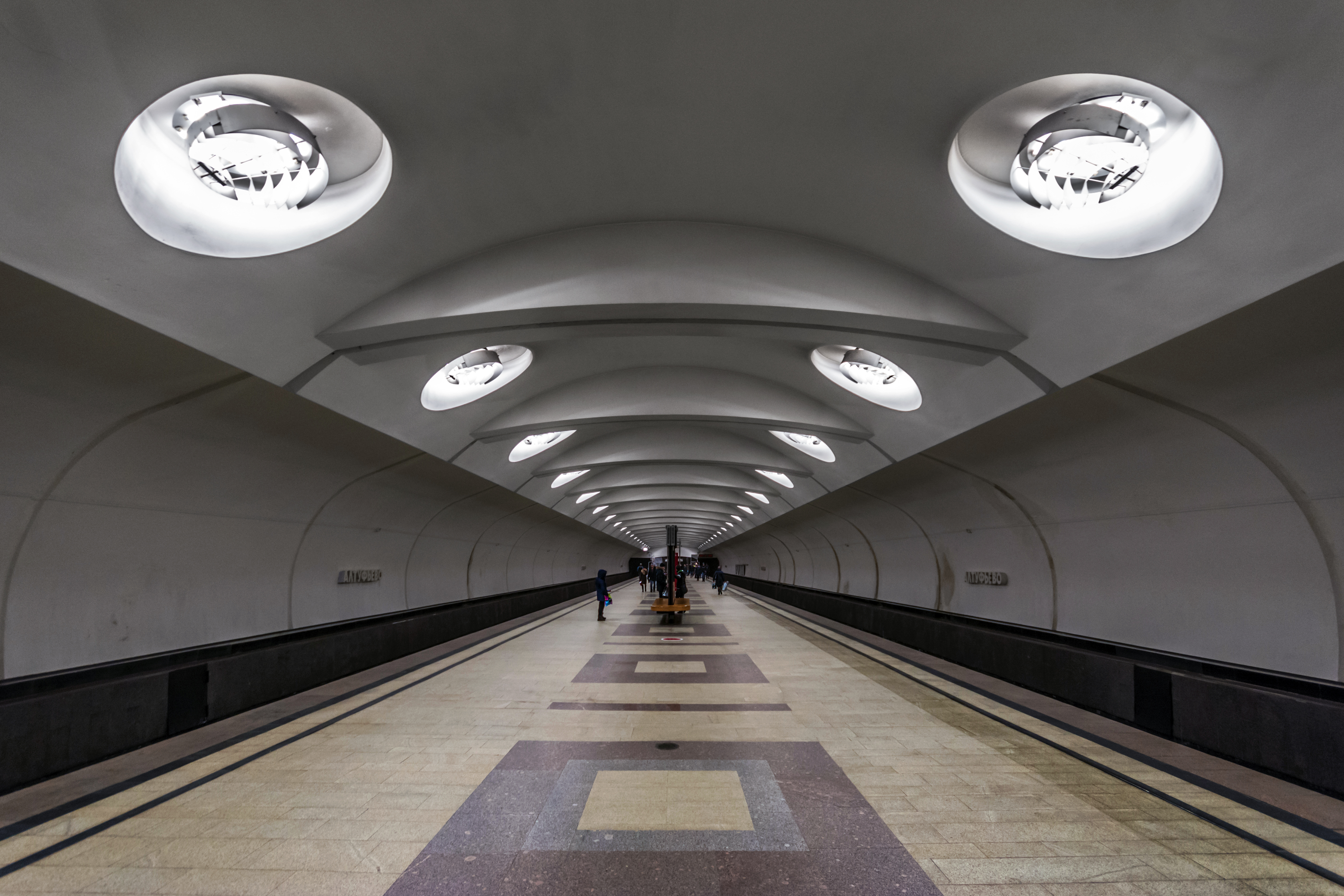

General information
- Location: Bibirevo District; Lianozovo District; North-Eastern Administrative Okrug; Moscow; Russia
- Coordinates: 55.8980°N 37.5870°E
- System: Moscow Metro station
- Owner: Moskovsky Metropoliten
- Line: Serpukhovsko-Timiryazevskaya line
- Platforms: 1 island platform
- Tracks: 2

Construction
- Structure type: shallow level single-vault station
- Depth: 9 metres (30 ft)
- Platform levels: 1
- Parking: No

Other information
- Station code: 129

History
- Opened: 15 July 1994; 32 years ago

Services
Preceding station	Moscow Metro	Following station
Terminus	Serpukhovsko-Timiryazevskaya line	Bibirevo towards Bulvar Dmitriya Donskogo
Route map
Location
- Location within Moscow Metro

Altufyevo (Russian: Алтуфьево, IPA: [ɐlˈtufʲjɪvə]) is the northern terminus of the Serpukhovsko-Timiryazevskaya Line of the Moscow Metro, and the northernmost station of the entire system. It was opened in 1994. The station is shallow: its depth is 9 meters. Its name corresponds to the name of the city district. The station is quite busy, with over 70,000 passengers entering per day, due to being located in a densely populated region, and being one of the stations serving the satellite town of Dolgoprudny. The station has experienced leaks from the unsuitable soil in its location. Although it might not happen, reconstruction of the station will treat the leakage.
