= Orekhovo–Borisovo constituency =

Russian legislative constituency

Orekhovo-Borisovo single-member constituency
- Constituency of the Russian State Duma

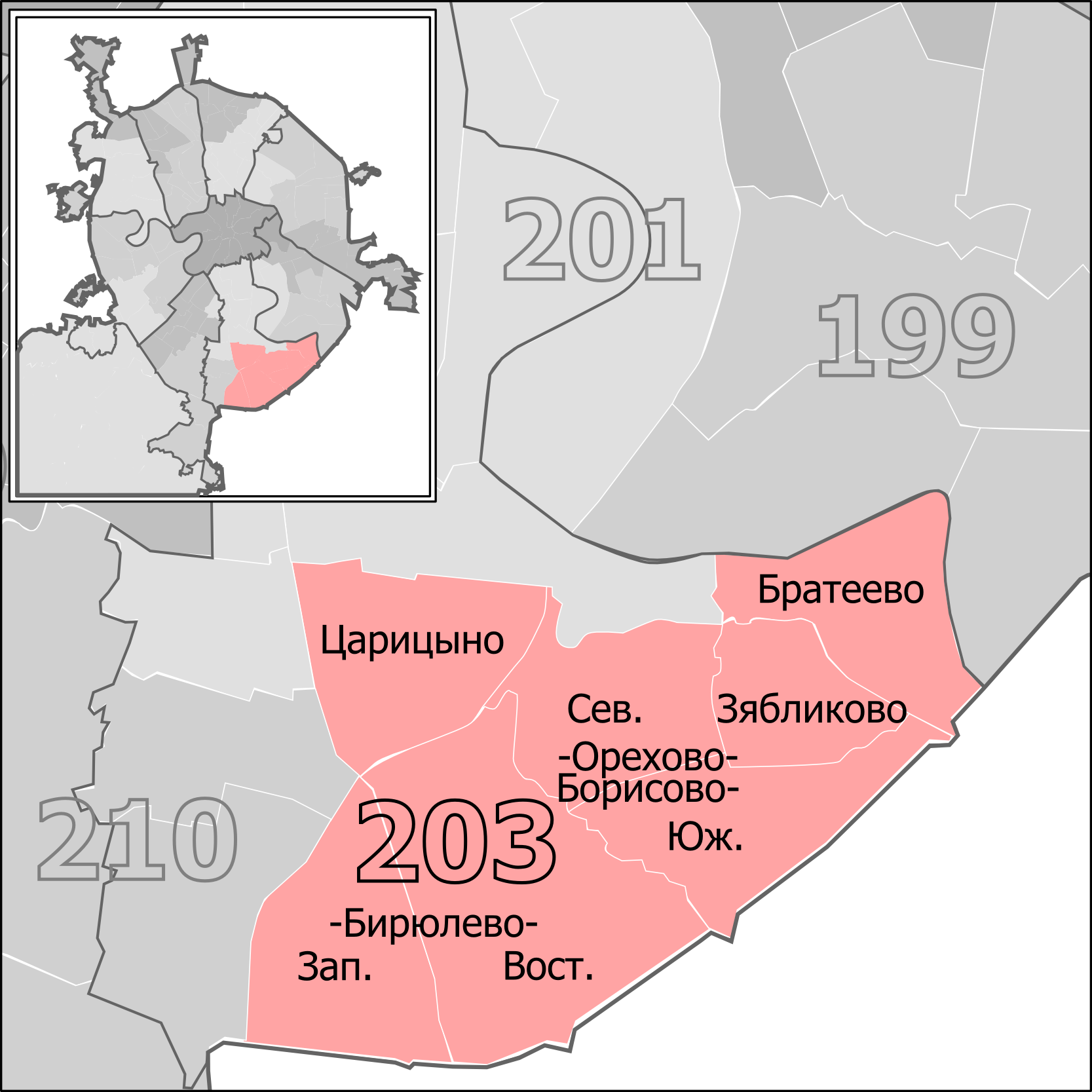
- Constituency boundaries since 2016
- Deputy: Yevgeny Nifantyev; United Russia
- Federal subject: Moscow
- Districts: Southern AO (Biryulyovo Vostochnoye, Biryulyovo Zapadnoye, Brateyevo, Orekhovo-Borisovo Severnoye, Orekhovo-Borisovo Yuzhnoye, Tsaritsyno, Zyablikovo)
- Voters: 512,258 (2026)

The Orekhovo-Borisovo сonstituency (No.202 (Note: No.194 Kashirsky constituency in 1993-1995, No.197 in 1995-2007, No.203 in 2016–2026)) is a Russian legislative constituency in Moscow. The constituency covers dense residential areas in outer Southern Moscow.

The constituency has been represented since 2021 by United Russia deputy Yevgeny Nifantyev, a billionaire pharmaceutical businessman, who won the open seat, succeeding one-term United Russia incumbent Lyubov Dukhanina.

== Boundaries ==
1993–1995 Kashirsky constituency: South-Eastern Administrative Okrug (Kapotnya District, Lyublino District, Maryino District, Pechatniki District), Southern Administrative Okrug (Brateyevo District, Orekhovo-Borisovo Severnoye District, Orekhovo-Borisovo Yuzhnoye District, Zyablikovo District)
The constituency covered residential areas in Southern and South-Eastern Moscow.

1995–2007: Southern Administrative Okrug (Biryulyovo Vostochnoye District, Brateyevo District, Moskvorechye-Saburovo District, Orekhovo-Borisovo Severnoye District, Orekhovo-Borisovo Yuzhnoye District, Tsaritsyno District, Zyablikovo District)
After the 1995 redistricting the constituency was significantly altered and renamed "Orekhovo-Borisovo constituency", losing its portion of South-Eastern Moscow to Lyublino constituency (Kapotnya, Lyublino and Maryino) and Avtozavodsky constituency (Pechatniki. This seat instead gained Biryulyovo Vostochnoye, Moskvorechye-Saburovo and Tsaritsyno to its east from the former Nagatinsky constituency.

2016–present: Southern Administrative Okrug (Biryulyovo Vostochnoye District, Biryulyovo Zapadnoye District, Brateyevo District, Orekhovo-Borisovo Severnoye District, Orekhovo-Borisovo Yuzhnoye District, Tsaritsyno District, Zyablikovo District)
The constituency was re-created for the 2016 election and retained most of its former territory, losing Moskvorechye-Saburovo to Nagatinsky constituency in exchange for Biryulyovo Zapadnoye from Chertanovo constituency.

== Members elected ==
Election	Member	Party
1993	Irina Khakamada (Note: in 1997 appointed as Head of State Committee on Support and Development of Small Business)	Independent
1995	Irina Khakamada	Common Cause
1998	Andrey Nikolaev	Independent
1999	Andrey Nikolaev	Andrey Nikolayev and Svyatoslav Fyodorov Bloc
2003	Konstantin Zatulin	United Russia
2007	Proportional representation - no election by constituency	
2011	Proportional representation - no election by constituency	
2016	Lyubov Dukhanina	United Russia
2021	Yevgeny Nifantyev	United Russia
2026	Yevgeny Nifantyev	United Russia

== Election results ==
=== 1993 ===
Summary of the 12 December 1993 Russian legislative election in the Kashirsky constituency
Candidate	Party	Votes	%
Irina Khakamada	Independent	62,956	27.61%
Igor Petrenko	Independent	22,017	9.66%
Sergey Druganov	Independent	20,161	8.84%
Alexander Ogorodnikov	Independent	15,410	6.76%
Grigory Rebrov	Communist Party	13,647	5.99%
Oleg Pilshchikov	Future of Russia–New Names	9,616	4.22%
Vera Stepanenko	Yavlinky–Boldyrev–Lukin	7,533	3.30%
Vladimir Boyarkin	Independent	7,161	3.14%
Grigory Chernikov	Agrarian Party	6,503	2.85%
Ilya Roitman	Russian Democratic Reform Movement	4,613	2.02%
against all		42,892	18.81%
Total		228,016	100%

=== 1995 ===
Summary of the 17 December 1995 Russian legislative election in the Orekhovo-Borisovo constituency
Candidate	Party	Votes	%
Irina Khakamada (incumbent)	Common Cause	98,835	33.95%
Anatoly Stankov	Independent	54,165	18.60%
Iona Andronov	Communist Party	27,060	9.29%
Andrey Volkov (incumbent) (Note: redistricted from Nagatinsky constituency)	Block of Djuna	12,202	4.19%
Valentina Rodionova	Cause of Peter the First	9,637	3.31%
Andrey Shcherbina	Congress of Russian Communities	9,232	3.17%
Stanislav Terekhov	Power to the People!	8,606	2.96%
Sergey Druganov	Ivan Rybkin Bloc	5,075	1.74%
Gennady Inzhutov	Independent	4,920	1.69%
Anton Sorokin	Independent	4,827	1.66%
Yury Spirin	Liberal Democratic Party	4,695	1.61%
Aleksandr Belyavsky	Christian-Democratic Union - Christians of Russia	4,228	1.45%
Yevgeny Kafyrin	Communists and Working Russia - for the Soviet Union	3,623	1.24%
Oleg Tarasenko	Party of Economic Freedom	3,248	1.12%
Sergey Volkov	Conservative Party	2,587	0.89%
Aram Shegunts	Independent	687	0.24%
against all		31,654	10.87%
Total		291,134	100%

=== 1998 ===
Summary of the 12 April 1998 by-election in the Orekhovo-Borisovo constituency
Candidate	Party	Votes	%
Andrey Nikolayev	Independent	102,862	64.52%
Oleg Sotnikov	Independent	24,637	15.45%
Yelena Bruk	Independent	6,804	4.27%
Ivan Silayev	Independent	4,614	2.89%
Svetlana Nosova	Independent	3,139	1.97%
Gennady Inzhutov	Independent	2,018	1.27%
Anatoly Stankov	Independent	1,327	0.83%
Nikolay Romanov	Independent	1,024	0.64%
Igor Chmurov	Independent	587	0.37%
against all		12,421	7.79%
Total		159,427	100%

=== 1999 ===
Summary of the 19 December 1999 Russian legislative election in the Orekhovo-Borisovo constituency
Candidate	Party	Votes	%
Andrey Nikolayev (incumbent)	Andrey Nikolayev and Svyatoslav Fyodorov Bloc	56,185	17.90%
Aleksandr Khinshtein	Independent	50,620	16.13%
Sergey Ivanov	Independent	31,424	10.01%
Sergey Ivanenko	Yabloko	29,685	9.46%
Oleg Sotnikov	Independent	23,481	7.48%
Natalia Belokhvostikova	Spiritual Heritage	21,692	6.91%
Valentina Boykova	Our Home – Russia	15,138	4.82%
Pyotr Burak	Independent	10,598	3.38%
Vladimir Belyayev	Social-Democrats of Russia	7,473	2.38%
Yury Kanatayev	Independent	6,296	2.01%
Sergey Novikov	Independent	4,155	1.32%
Viktor Ryzhov	Independent	2,191	0.70%
against all		46,707	14.88%
Total		313,821	100%

=== 2003 ===
Summary of the 7 December 2003 Russian legislative election in the Orekhovo-Borisovo constituency
Candidate	Party	Votes	%
Konstantin Zatulin	United Russia	125,050	44.36%
Andrey Nikolayev (incumbent)	People's Party	53,876	19.11%
Irina Yermakova	Great Russia – Eurasian Union	16,381	5.81%
Nikolay Nikolayev	Independent	9,465	3.36%
Marina Smirnova	Liberal Democratic Party	6,800	2.41%
Vadim Sukhmansky	Independent	2,316	0.82%
against all		61,010	21.64%
Total		283,751	100%

=== 2016 ===
Summary of the 18 September 2016 Russian legislative election in the Orekhovo-Borisovo constituency
Candidate	Party	Votes	%
Lyubov Dukhanina	United Russia	71,537	42.00%
Aleksandr Medvedev	Communist Party	25,036	14.70%
Boris Chernyshov	Liberal Democratic Party	15,005	8.81%
Darya Sorokina	A Just Russia	13,495	7.92%
Igor Drandin	Yabloko	10,606	6.23%
Yulia Misevich	The Greens	7,028	4.13%
Aleksandr Abramovich	Communists of Russia	5,394	3.17%
Sergey Yerokhov	People's Freedom Party	5,358	3.15%
Anatoly Polyakov	Patriots of Russia	4,917	2.89%
Rakhman Yansukov	Party of Growth	3,839	2.25%
Ibragim Khudayberdiyev	Rodina	2,437	1.43%
Total		170,330	100%

=== 2021 ===
Summary of the 17-19 September 2021 Russian legislative election in the Orekhovo-Borisovo constituency
Candidate	Party	Votes	%
Yevgeny Nifantyev	United Russia	92,484	38.59%
Vitaly Petrov	Communist Party	46,579	19.43%
Oleg Kazenkov	A Just Russia — For Truth	17,817	7.43%
Vasily Petrov	Communists of Russia	16,923	7.06%
Alisa Smolich	New People	15,001	6.26%
Yevgeny Turushev	Liberal Democratic Party	12,876	5.37%
Svetlana Anisimova	Russian Party of Freedom and Justice	10,941	4.56%
Ilya Gurevich	Yabloko	7,850	3.28%
Natalya Shushlebina	The Greens	5,442	2.27%
Ksenia Shlyamina	Green Alternative	3,734	1.56%
Lev Yudin	Civic Platform	2,679	1.12%
Pavel Penkin	Party of Growth	2,563	1.07%
Total		239,688	100%

=== 2026 ===
Summary of the 18-20 September 2026 Russian legislative election in the Orekhovo-Borisovo constituency
Candidate	Party	Votes	%
Yevgeny Nifantyev (incumbent)	United Russia	111,698	41.39%
Leonid Vorobyov	Communist Party	41,426	15.35%
Ivan Demidov	New People	29,202	10.82%
Sergey Parkhomenko	Yabloko	25,178	9.33%
Nikita Borisoglebsky	Liberal Democratic Party	22,466	8.32%
Andrey Ivanov	A Just Russia	16,146	5.98%
Leonid Andrusenko	Communists of Russia	13,734	5.09%
Pavel Chebotarev	The Greens	9,203	3.41%
Total		269,887	100%
