= Chertanovo =

Chertanovo Чертаново (Russian)
- District
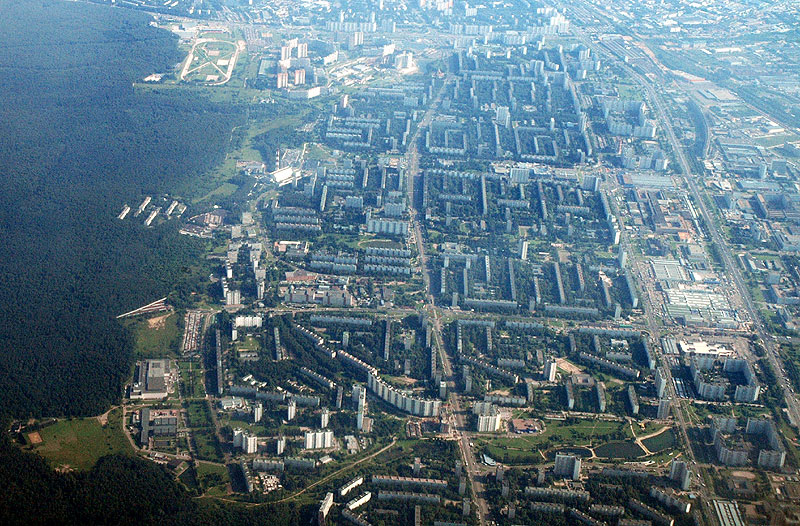
- View from the plane
- Chertanovo on Moscow map
- Coordinates: 55°37′14″N 37°35′47″E
- Country: Russia
- Federal subject: Moscow
- City: Moscow
- Established: before 1665

Area
  - Total: 21.2975 km^{2} (8.2230 sq mi)

Population (2010 Census)
  - Total: 364,693
  - Density: 17,123.7/km^{2} (44,350.3/sq mi)
- Website: www.chertanovo.info

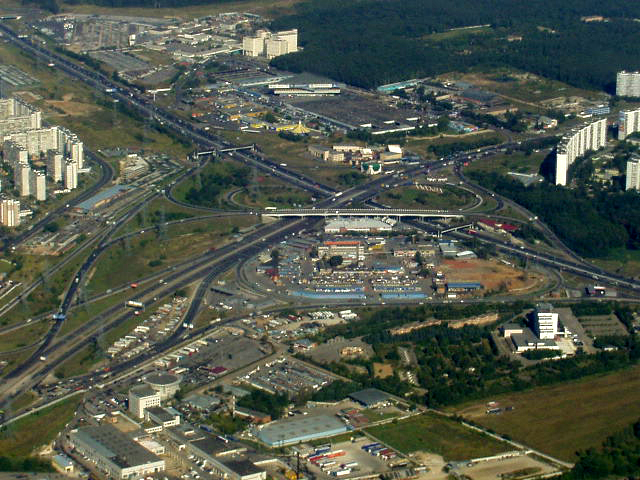
Modern view of Chertanovo: Moscow Ring Road interchange with M2 highway

Chertanovo (Russian: Чертаново) is a housing area in the Southern Administrative Okrug of Moscow, Russia. The name derives from Chertanovo village first mentioned in 1665. The territory became part of Moscow in 1960. The area is 21,3 km^{2} and has a population of 364,693 (census of 2010). There are three administrative districts of Moscow (raions), five metro stations, three railway stations, 25 streets and five parks.

== History ==
There are 10 groups of burial mounds of Vyatichi and one of the medieval Slavic tribes, dated 12 - 13th century.

There are many version of origin of the name Chertanovo. According to Vladimir Toporov, the name of Chertanovo village derives from name Chertanovka river and its name derives from medieval Finno-Ugric languages.

Chertanovo village was located on the territory of modern Northern Chertanovo district near Chertanovo railway platform.

Chertanovo village was mentioned for the first time in 1665 in the book by S.A. Belokurov "Daily notes of Prikaz of Secret Affairs" (Moscow, 1908): "On December 28, on Saturday, the great sovereign desired to go to Chertanovo in an hour before dawn" (Russian: "декабря в 28 день в субботу великий государь изволил итить в Чертаново за час до света"). However, it was not mentioned in census books in 1646. Therefore, Chertanovo village may have been built between 1646 and 1665.

Additionally, 8 other villages were situated on today's Chertanovo territory:

- Krasnoe sel`tso (сельцо Красное; Red village; sel`tso is a historical type of inhabited localities in Russia)
- Krasny Mayak sovkhoz (совхоз Красный Маяк; Red lighthouse state farm)
- Biryulyovo sel`tso (сельцо Бирюлёво)
- Pokrovskoye selo or Pokrovskoye-Gorodnya selo (село Покровское or село Покровское-Городня; Intercession village; "Pokrov" means Intercession of the Theotokos i.e. Protection of the Virgin; selo meant a village with a Church)
- Pokrovskiye Vyselki village (деревня Покровские Выселки; vyselki is a type of inhabited localities meaning "village of evicted people"; that is, a new village found by people who resettled)
- Krasny Stroitel` (Red Builder) workmen's settlement or Gazoprovod (Gas pipeline) workmen's settlement (рабочий посёлок Красный строитель or рабочий посёлок Газопровод)
- Mosstroyput` settlement (посёлок Мосстройпуть; meaning Moscow communications development), formerly known as settlement of Communications Department (посёлок МПС, Министерства Путей Сообщения)
- Annino village (деревня Аннино; "Ann`s village")

In 1960, Chertanovo and all territories right up to modern Moscow Ring Road became a part of Moscow.

Since the late 1960s intensive building of houses of mass (panel) series began. (architects: V. Voznesensky, T. Drozdova, V. Serzhantov, V. Gromoglasov, N. Suzdaleva). In the late 1970s, building of Exemplary Perspective Housing Area began in Northern Chertanovo (engineers: L. Dubek, architects M. Posokhin, A. Shapiro, L. Misozhnikov, A. Kegler, Yu. Ivanov, B. Malyarchuk, V. Loginov, V. Uborevich-Borovsky, V. Dadya etc.). In 1980, it was used as an Olympic village. Now this territory is called microrayon Chertanovo Severnoye (microdistrict Northern Chertanovo) and is part of Chertanovo Severnoye District.

== Geography and transport ==
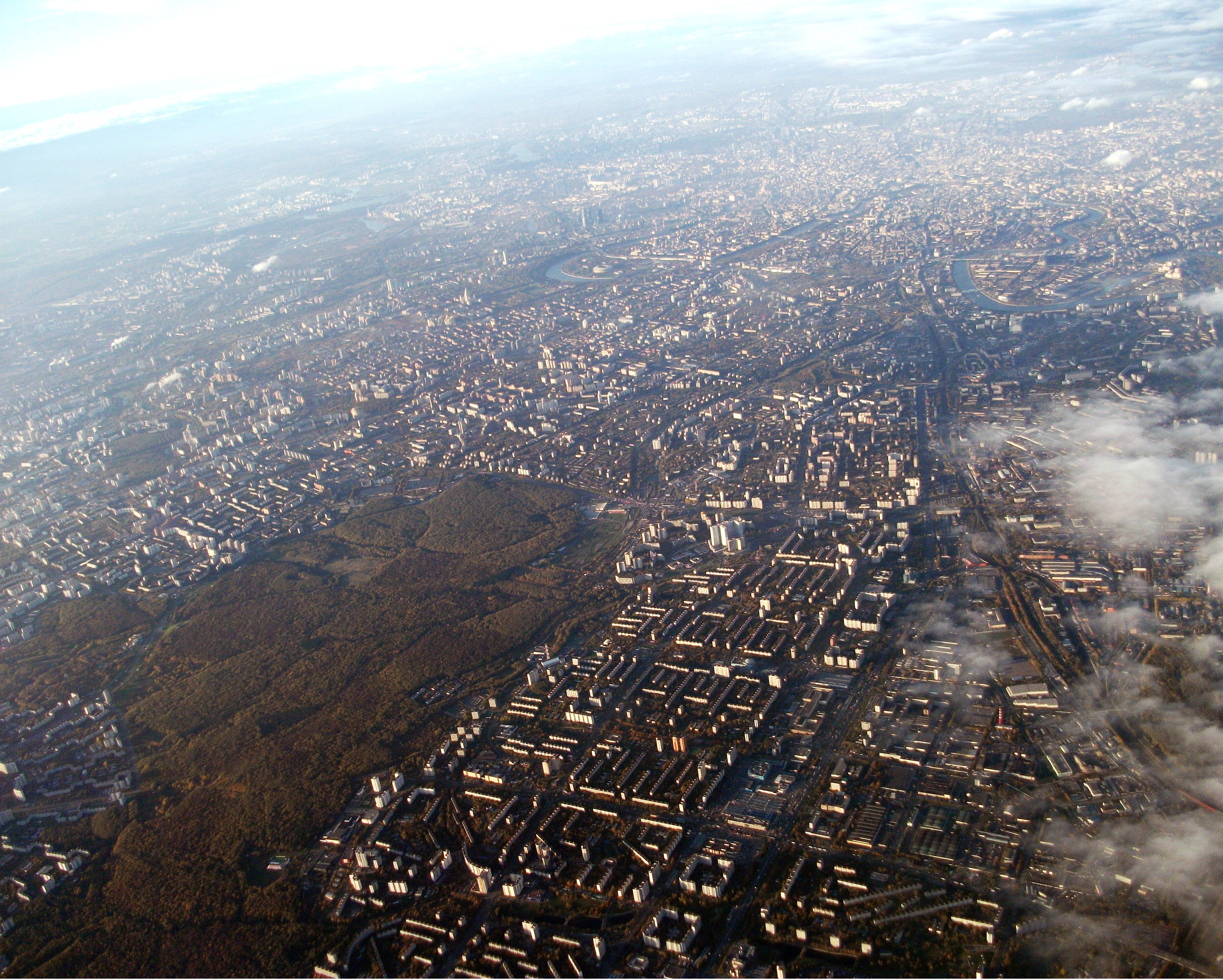
Chertanovo, Bitsa Park and neighbour Moscow districts

The northern border of the area is Balaklavsky (Balaklava) prospekt (avenue); the eastern border is Paveletsky and Kursky railway lines; the southern border is Moscow Ring Road; the western border is a border of Bitsa Park.

The territory of Chertanovo is a plain.

=== Rivers ===
Two main rivers:

- Chertanovka
- Gorodnya

Other rivers:

- Vodyanka, right tributary of Chertanovka (it may mean merely "Water river")
- Krasny (Red) creek, right tributary of Chertanovka
- Kotlyakovka, left tributary of Gorodnya
- Teplyakovsky creek

=== Ponds ===
16 ponds are located in Chertanovo, most of them are formed from two main rivers:

- Bol`shoy Chertanovsky (Big Chertanovo) pond
- Maly Chertanovsky (Small Chertanovo) pond
- Verkhny (Upper Chertanovo) Chertanovsky pond
- Krasny (Red) pond
- Kirovogradskiye (Kirovograd) ponds
- Varshavskiye (Warsaw) ponds
- Pokrovsky (Intercession) pond
- Sobachy (Dog`s) pond
- Khrulyov pond and others

=== Buildings ===
A large part of the territory is occupied by high-rise buildings. Apartment buildings can have anywhere from three (old houses in Annino historical region in South Chertanovo district) to 39 storeys (modern building "Avenue 77"). The majority of the buildings are blocks of flats of 9 or 17 storeys.

An industrial zone is situated in the eastern part of Chertanovo, however most of the plants do not work and its buildings are used for offices of different companies.

=== Administrative districts of Moscow ===
The territory of Chertanovo is divided among three Moscow administrative districts and Intra-city municipal territories as follows:

- Chertanovo Severnoye (Northern Chertanovo)
- Chertanovo Tsentralnoye (Central Chertanovo)
- Chertanovo Yuzhnoye (South Chertanovo)

=== Metro ===
Serpukhovsko-Timiryazevskaya Line ("Grey" branch) and the Butovskaya Line of Moscow Metro passes through Chertanovo.

Metro stations of Serpukhovsko-Timiryazevskaya Line:

- Chertanovskaya, since November 8, 1983
- Yuzhnaya, since November 8, 1983
- Prazhskaya, since November 6, 1985
- Ulitsa Akademika Yangelya, since August 31, 2000
- Annino, since December 12, 2001

Metro station of Butovskaya Line:

- Lesoparkovaya, since 27 February 2014

=== Railway ===
Paveletsky and Kursky railway lines run along the edge of Chertanovo (Russian Railways JSC). There are three railway stations:

- Chertanovo rail stop with a platform (In contrast to the railway station stopping point, the tracks don't branch) of the Paveletsky suburban line (Northern Chertanovo district), since 1936
- Pokrovskoye (Intercession station; Pokrovskoye was the name of the village) of Kursky suburban line (Central Chertanovo district), since 1949
- Krasny Stroitel station with a platform (Red Builder station. Red Builder was the name of the workmen's settlement) of Kursky suburban line (South Chertanovo district), since 1929

=== Other public transportation ===
Four bus parks, one of which is located in Cheratnovo (17th bus park), service 36 bus routes. Bus numbers: 28, 37, 118, 147, 160, 163, 168, 189, 218, 222, 225, 241, 249, 296, 624, 635, 643, 668, 671, 674, 675, 680, 682, 683, 784, 786, 796, 797, 819, 828, 831 and others

Trolleybus number: 40

Along Chertanovskaya street is a fenced tram line

Tram number: 1, 3, 16

Routing taxi (commercial microbuses) number: 225М, 328М, 518М.

From the metro station "Yuzhnaya" and "Annino", suburban and long-distance long-range buses go to the southern regions of Russia.

=== Streets ===
There are 25 streets (the date of official assignment name is given in parentheses).

Main roads:

- Varshavskoye Shosse (Warsaw highway) (1950)
- Moscow Ring Road (1960)
- Chertanovskaya (Chertanovo) street (24.12.1968)
- Balaklavsky prospekt (Balaklava avenue) (29.04.1965)
- Podolskikh Kursantov (of Podolsk cadets) street (9.08.1989) (Podolsk cadets are young heroes of Second World War who killed about 5 thousand Nazis)

Other roads:

- (Academician Yangel) street (27.12.1972)
- Gazoprovod (Gas pipeline) street (affirmed on 26.08.1960)
- Dnepropetrovskaya (Dnepropetrovsk) street (3.09.1968)
- Dnepropetrovsky proyezd (Dnepropetrovsk driveway; proyezd means a small street) (23.12.1971)
- Dorozhnaya (Road) street (1960) is in fact a three different streets
- Dorozhny 1st proyezd (Road 1st driveway) (23.12.1971)
- Dorozhny 3rd proyezd (Road 3rd driveway) (23.12.1971)
- Kirovogradskaya (Kirovograd) street (3.09.1968)
- Kirovogradsky bul`var (Kirovograd parkway) (2008) is a well-organized pedestrian street from Chertanovskaya metro station to Kirovogradskaya street, passing over the metro line.
- Kirovogradsky proyezd (Kirovograd driveway) (23.12.1971)
- Kirpichniye Vyemki (Brick excavation, literally "Brick seizures") street (1960)
- Krasnogo Mayaka (Red lighthouse) street (2.12.1969)
- Mosstroyput` (Moscow communications development) street (1938) now exists only in the documents of the Moscow Government
- Pokrovskaya (Intercession) 1st street goes through the yards; no home is not attributed to the street, but it is marked on many official maps.
- Pokrovskaya 2nd street (3.09.1968)
- Rossoshanskaya (Rossosh) street (2.12.1969)
- Rossoshansky proyezd (Rossosh driveway) (23.12.1973)
- Staropokrovsky proyezd (Old-Intercession driveway) (23.09.2013)
- Sumskaya (Sumy) street (24.12.1968)
- Sumskoy proyezd (Sumy driveway) (3.09.1968)

=== Parks ===
In Chertanovo, there are many parks, squares, green yards and streets.

- Bitsa forest-park (edge of the park) is a second-large natural park (forest) of Moscow.
- Park of the 30th Anniversary of the Victory, since October 29, 1974.
- Chertanovskoye podvorye (Chertanovo farmstead)
- Pokrovsky park (Intercession park)
- The alley or School alley

=== Cemetery ===
- Staropokrovskoye (Old-Intercession) cemetery, since 1858.

== Culture ==
=== Theatre ===
- Theatre "Small theatrical troupe", Sumskoy proyezd, 6A

=== Cinema ===
- Cinema of cinema circuit "Cinema park" (Interros), Dnepropetrovskaya street, 2 (shopping centre "Global City"), since April 2007.
- "Sezon Cinema" ("Season of Cinema"), Krasnogo Mayaka street, 2б (shopping centre «Prazhsky passage»).
- Cinema of cinema circuit "Formula Kino" ("Formula of movies"), microdistrict Chertanovo Severnoye, 1А (shopping centre "Aventura").

=== Memorials ===
- "Training airfield (fragment) in Cheratnovo": a monument to the pilots who died during World War II, Kirovogradskaya street, estate 10. In 1970 obelisk was opened. On May 9, 1995, at the initiative of front-line soldier and poet A.V. Tsvetkov and other members of district Council of Veterans, V.I. Bakhtin and L.I. Rappoport and subprefect of municipal formation "Chertanovo Severnoye" E.I. Mulenkov, opened the monument of memory. Authors: sculptor A.M. Ryleev and architect M.I. Sudakov. The memorial is dedicated to crew of bomber warplane SB-2 of 173st air regiment who was brought down on October 1, 1941 (during World War II):

- Yury Petrovich Tikhomirov, unit commander, pilot, lieutenant (1919-1941)

- Aleksey Yakovlevich Onchurov, gunner-bombardier-air sentry, lieutenant (1918-1941)

- Pavel Aleksandrovich Vorona, gunner-radio operator, sergeant (1919-1941)

- Memorial complex in Park of the 30th Anniversary of the Victory:

== Sport ==
The most significant sports facilities are

- Horse-Racing Complex "Bitsa"
- Moscow Center of Martial Arts
- FC Chertanovo Moscow
- Sport and Recovery Complex Krasny Mayak (Red lighthouse)
- Chertanovo Sport and Education Center
- Sport Complex Yuzhny (South)

== In the media ==
The 2017 Fedor Bondarchuk Sci-Fi film Attraction is set in the housing district, and revolves around the crash of an alien spaceship.

== Pictures ==
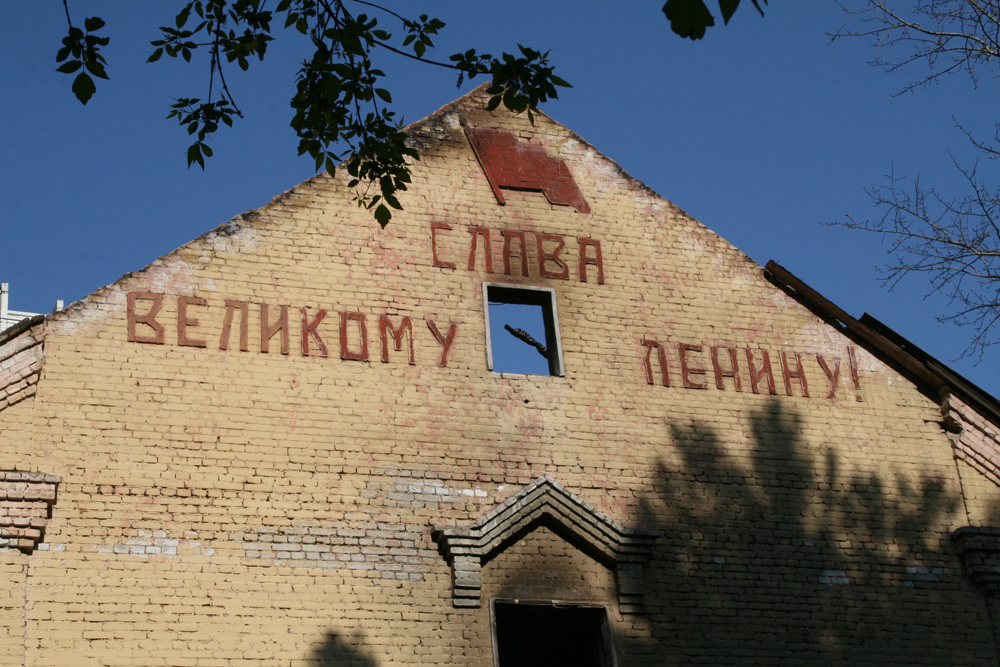
The forsaken caserne in Chertanovo. Inscription on the wall: Glory to the great Lenin

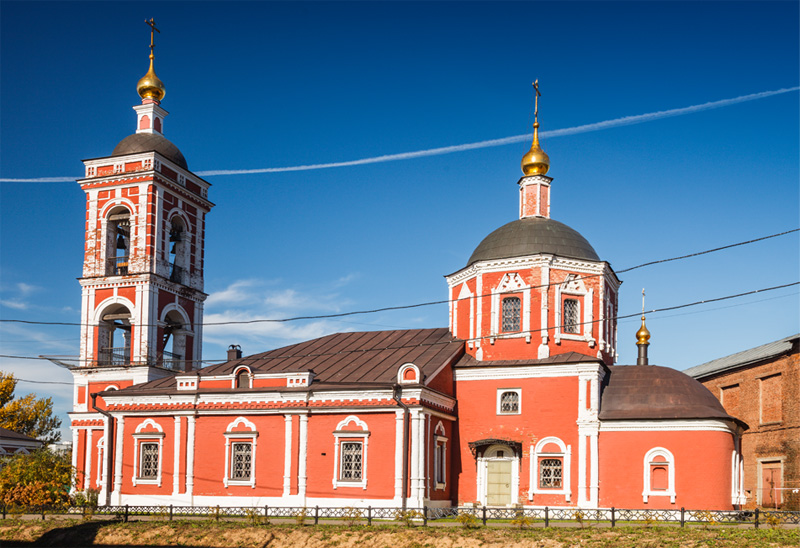
The Church of the Protection of the Blessed Virgin near Gorodnya river

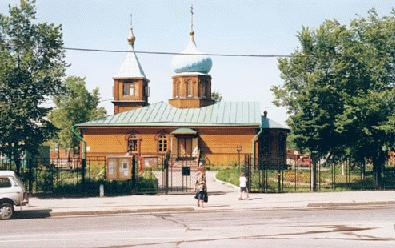
The Church of "Imperial" Icon of Mother of God, old building (was built in 1990s)

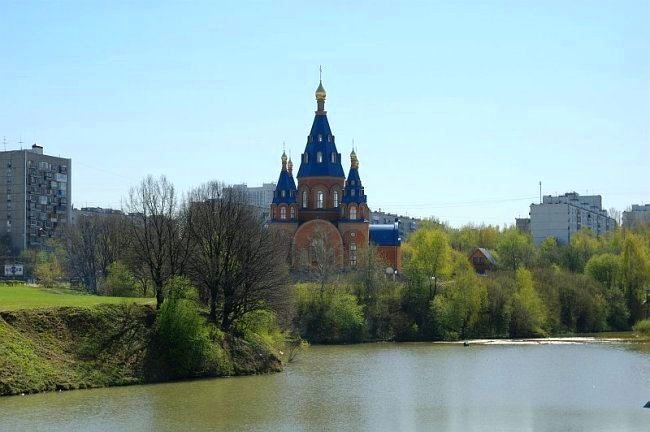
The Church of "Imperial" Icon of Mother of God, new building

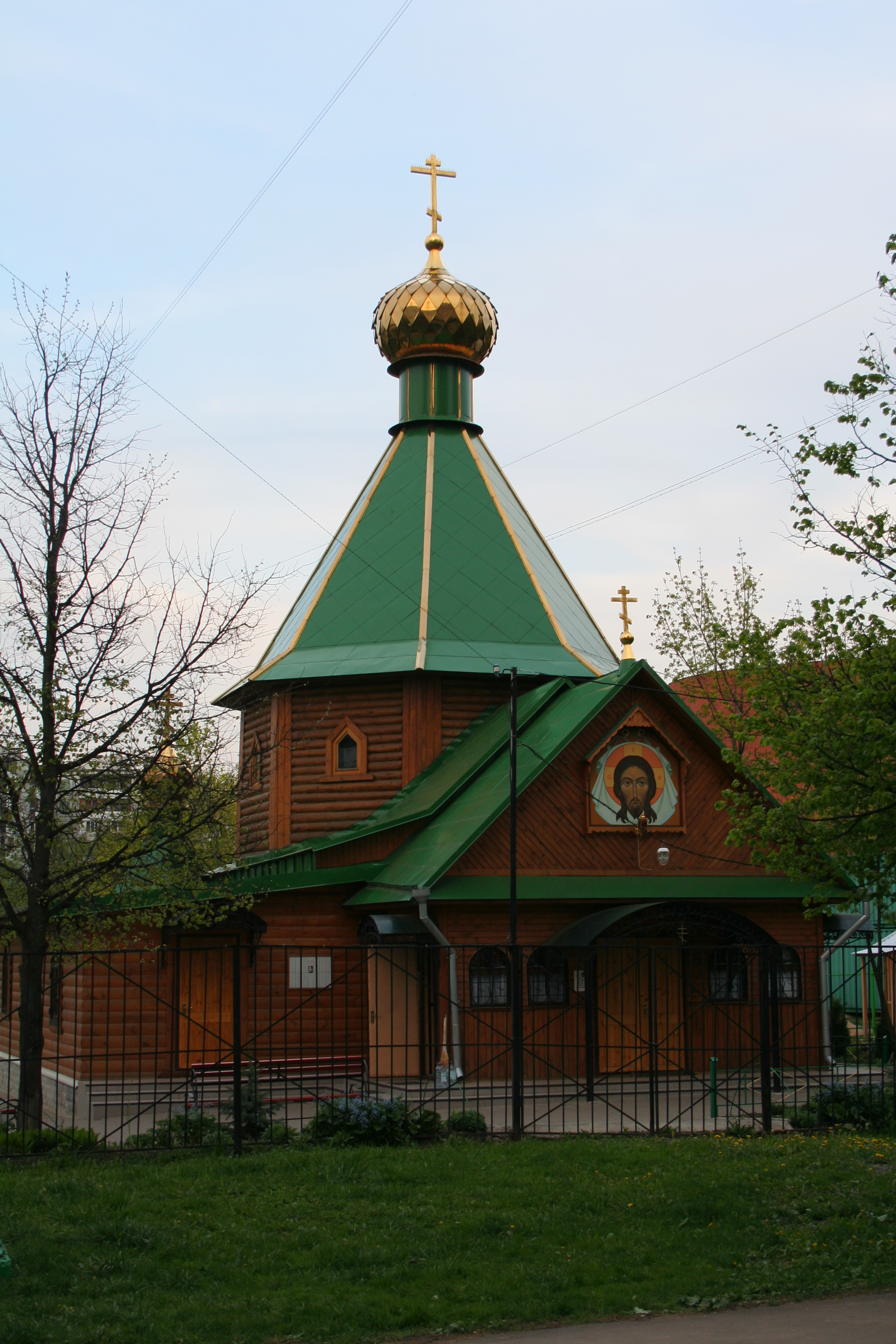
The Church of the Life-Giving Holy Trinity
