= Moscow City Duma District 27 =

Moscow City Duma electoral constituency

- Moscow City Duma constituency
- Deputy: Aleksandr Likhanov; United Russia
- Administrative Okrug: Southern
- Districts: part of Moskvorechye-Saburovo, Nagatinsky Zaton, Tsaritsyno
- Voters: 155,830 (2024)

Moscow City Duma District 27 is one of 45 constituencies in Moscow City Duma. Currently the district covers parts of Southern Moscow.

The district has been represented since 2024 by United Russia deputy Aleksandr Likhanov, a former Moscow Fairs director, who succeeded one-term United Russia incumbent and city polyclinic chief doctor Yelena Samyshina from District 28.

== Boundaries ==
District boundaries from 2014 to 2024

1993–1997: Severnoye Butovo, Yasenevo, Yuzhnoye Butovo
The district covered outer parts of South-Western Moscow.

1997–2001: Severnoye Butovo, Yasenevo, Yuzhnoye Butovo, TEOS Bitsa Park
The district was unchanged except for Bitsa Park being created into a separate administrative unit.

2001–2005: Severnoye Butovo, part of Yasenevo, Yuzhnoye Butovo, TEOS Bitsa Park (Note: merged into Yasenevo District in 2002)
The district continued to cover outer parts of South-Western Moscow but ceded part of Yasenevo to District 29.

2005–2014: constituency abolished
Prior to the 2005 election the number of constituencies was reduced to 15, so the district was eliminated.

2014–2024: Orekhovo-Borisovo Severnoye, part of Orekhovo-Borisovo Yuzhnoye
The district was created prior to the 2014 election, after Moscow City Duma had been expanded from 35 to 45 seats. It covers most of Orekhovo-Borisovo in Southern Moscow.

2024–present: part of Moskvorechye-Saburovo, Nagatinsky Zaton, Tsaritsyno
During the 2023–24 Moscow redistricting the district was placed entirely into District 26. In its new configuration the district covers most of former District 28 (part of Moskvorechye-Saburovo, part of Nagatinsky Zaton, Tsaritsyno) as well as the rest of Nagatinsky Zaton from District 32.

== Members elected ==
| Election | Member | Party |
|---|---|---|
| 1993 | Aleksandr Goroshko | Independent |
| 1997 | Andrey Shirokov | Independent |
| 2001 | Vladimir Gruzdev (Note: elected to the State Duma in December 2003) | Independent |
| 2004 | Aleksandr Semennikov | United Russia |
| 2005 | Constituency eliminated | |
| 2009 | Constituency eliminated | |
| 2014 | Stepan Orlov | United Russia |
| 2019 | Stepan Orlov | Independent |
| 2024 | Aleksandr Likhanov | United Russia |

== Election results ==
=== 2001 ===
Summary of the 16 December 2001 Moscow City Duma election in District 27
| Candidate | Party | Votes | % |
|---|---|---|---|
| Vladimir Gruzdev | Independent | 31,983 | 53.17% |
| Andrey Shirokov (incumbent) | Independent | 9,942 | 16.53% |
| Georgy Buslavin | Yabloko | 8,089 | 13.45% |
| Gennady Shirokov | Independent | 1,824 | 3.03% |
| against all | | 7,022 | 11.67% |
| Total | | 60,704 | 100% |

=== 2004 ===
Summary of the 14 March 2004 Moscow City Duma by-election in District 27
| Candidate | Party | Votes | % |
|---|---|---|---|
| Aleksandr Semennikov | United Russia | 60,058 | 48.24% |
| Gennady Shirokov | Independent | 17,250 | 13.85% |
| Igor Dyakov | Liberal Democratic Party | 10,273 | 8.25% |
| against all | | 33,918 | 27.24% |
| Total | | 124,508 | 100% |

=== 2014 ===
Summary of the 14 September 2014 Moscow City Duma election in District 27
| Candidate | Party | Votes | % |
|---|---|---|---|
| Stepan Orlov (incumbent) (Note: redistricted from District 11) | United Russia | 23,007 | 69.28% |
| Aleksey Dobrovolsky | Communist Party | 4,872 | 14.67% |
| Viktor Gogolev | Independent | 2,491 | 7.50% |
| Olga Shcherbakova | Liberal Democratic Party | 1,645 | 4.95% |
| Total | | 33,210 | 100% |

=== 2019 ===
Summary of the 8 September 2019 Moscow City Duma election in District 27
| Candidate | Party | Votes | % |
|---|---|---|---|
| Stepan Orlov (incumbent) | Independent | 12,943 | 41.26% |
| Aleksey Dryga | Communist Party | 11,044 | 35.20% |
| Sergey Korovin | Liberal Democratic Party | 2,285 | 7.28% |
| Sergey Yerokhov | A Just Russia | 1,999 | 6.37% |
| Viktor Gogolev | Communists of Russia | 1,959 | 6.24% |
| Total | | 31,373 | 100% |

=== 2024 ===
Summary of the 6–8 September 2024 Moscow City Duma election in District 27
| Candidate | Party | Votes | % |
|---|---|---|---|
| Aleksandr Likhanov | United Russia | 30,963 | 48.21% |
| Maksim Doronkin | Communist Party | 7,557 | 11.77% |
| Aleksandr Fomin | Liberal Democratic Party | 6,809 | 10.60% |
| Yevgenia Gromova | A Just Russia – For Truth | 6,374 | 9.92% |
| Ivan Sitnikov | New People | 5,548 | 8.64% |
| Irina Avdonina | Independent | 4,065 | 6.33% |
| Andrey Lachkov | Independent | 2,885 | 4.49% |
| Total | | 64,227 | 100% |
