= Moscow City Duma District 26 =

Moscow City Duma electoral constituency

- Moscow City Duma constituency
- Deputy: Stepan Orlov; United Russia
- Administrative Okrug: Southern
- Districts: Orekhovo-Borisovo Severnoye, Orekhovo-Borisovo Yuzhnoye
- Voters: 162,460 (2024)

Moscow City Duma District 26 is one of 45 constituencies in Moscow City Duma. Currently the district covers outer parts of Southern Moscow.

The district has been represented since 2024 by City Duma Deputy Chairman and United Russia deputy Stepan Orlov, a seven-term member, who was redistricted from District 27.

== Boundaries ==
District boundaries from 2014 to 2024

1993–2001: Cheryomushki, Kotlovka, Obruchevsky, Zyuzino
The district covered parts of South-Western Moscow.

2001–2005: part of Cheryomushki, Kotlovka, Obruchevsky, Zyuzino
The district continued to cover parts of South-Western Moscow but lost part of Cheryomushki to neighbouring District 25.

2005–2014: constituency abolished
Prior to the 2005 election the number of constituencies was reduced to 15, so the district was eliminated.

2014–2024: Brateyevo, parts of Orekhovo-Borisovo Yuzhnoye, Zyablikovo
The district was created prior to the 2014 election, after Moscow City Duma had been expanded from 35 to 45 seats. It covers eastern parts of Southern Moscow.

2024–present: Orekhovo-Borisovo Severnoye, Orekhovo-Borisovo Yuzhnoye
During the 2023–24 Moscow redistricting the district retained only a small part of Orekhovo-Borisovo Yuzhnoye and absorbed most of former District 27 (Orekhovo-Borisovo Severnoye and the rest of Orekhovo-Borisovo Yuzhnoye), while more than 80% of its former territory (Brateyevo and Zyablikovo]] became part of District 25.

== Members elected ==
Election	Member	Party
1993	Sergey Shokhin (Note: resigned in 1995 to retain his job as Chairman of Moscow Accounts Chamber)	Choice of Russia
1996	Aleksey Ulyukayev	Independent
1997	Mikhail Vyshegorodtsev (Note: appointed Head of Moscow Department of Support and Development of Small Entrepreneurship in August 2005)	Independent
2001	Mikhail Vyshegorodtsev	Independent
2005	Constituency eliminated	
2009	Constituency eliminated	
2014	Kirill Shchitov	United Russia
2019	Kirill Shchitov	Independent
2024	Stepan Orlov	United Russia

== Election results ==
=== 2001 ===
Summary of the 16 December 2001 Moscow City Duma election in District 26
Candidate	Party	Votes	%
Mikhail Vyshegorodtsev (incumbent)	Independent	36,295	58.37%
Ruslan Khrustalev	Communist Party	9,488	15.26%
Gennady Pchelnikov	Independent	5,074	8.16%
Vladimir Kuzin	Independent	3,361	5.41%
against all		6,465	10.40%
Total		62,686	100%

=== 2014 ===
Summary of the 14 September 2014 Moscow City Duma election in District 26
Candidate	Party	Votes	%
Kirill Shchitov	United Russia	16,419	51.37%
Yevgeny Balashov	Communist Party	10,330	32.32%
Yury Medovar	Yabloko	1,922	6.01%
Vladislav Fedosov	Liberal Democratic Party	1,379	4.31%
Andrey Proydakov	A Just Russia	966	3.02%
Total		31,963	100%

=== 2019 ===
Summary of the 8 September 2019 Moscow City Duma election in District 26
Candidate	Party	Votes	%
Kirill Shchitov (incumbent)	Independent	10,553	37.27%
Vladimir Kalinin	A Just Russia	7,087	25.03%
Andrey Ispolatov	Communist Party	3,709	13.10%
Svetlana Anisimova	Communists of Russia	3,243	11.45%
Ilya Aksenov	Liberal Democratic Party	2,567	9.07%
Total		28,312	100%

=== 2024 ===
Summary of the 6–8 September 2024 Moscow City Duma election in District 26
Candidate	Party	Votes	%
Stepan Orlov (incumbent) (Note: redistricted from District 27)	United Russia	40,594	58.99%
Dmitry Pavlov	Communist Party	8,204	11.92%
Pavel Kashirin	New People	5,885	8.55%
Ilnur Markelov	Liberal Democratic Party	5,545	8.06%
Pavel Voytovich	A Just Russia – For Truth	4,455	6.47%
Konstantin Panchenko	Independent	4,101	5.96%
Total		68,810	100%
