= Ulitsa Akademika Yangelya =

Moscow Metro station

Ulitsa Akademika Yangelya Улица академика Янгеля
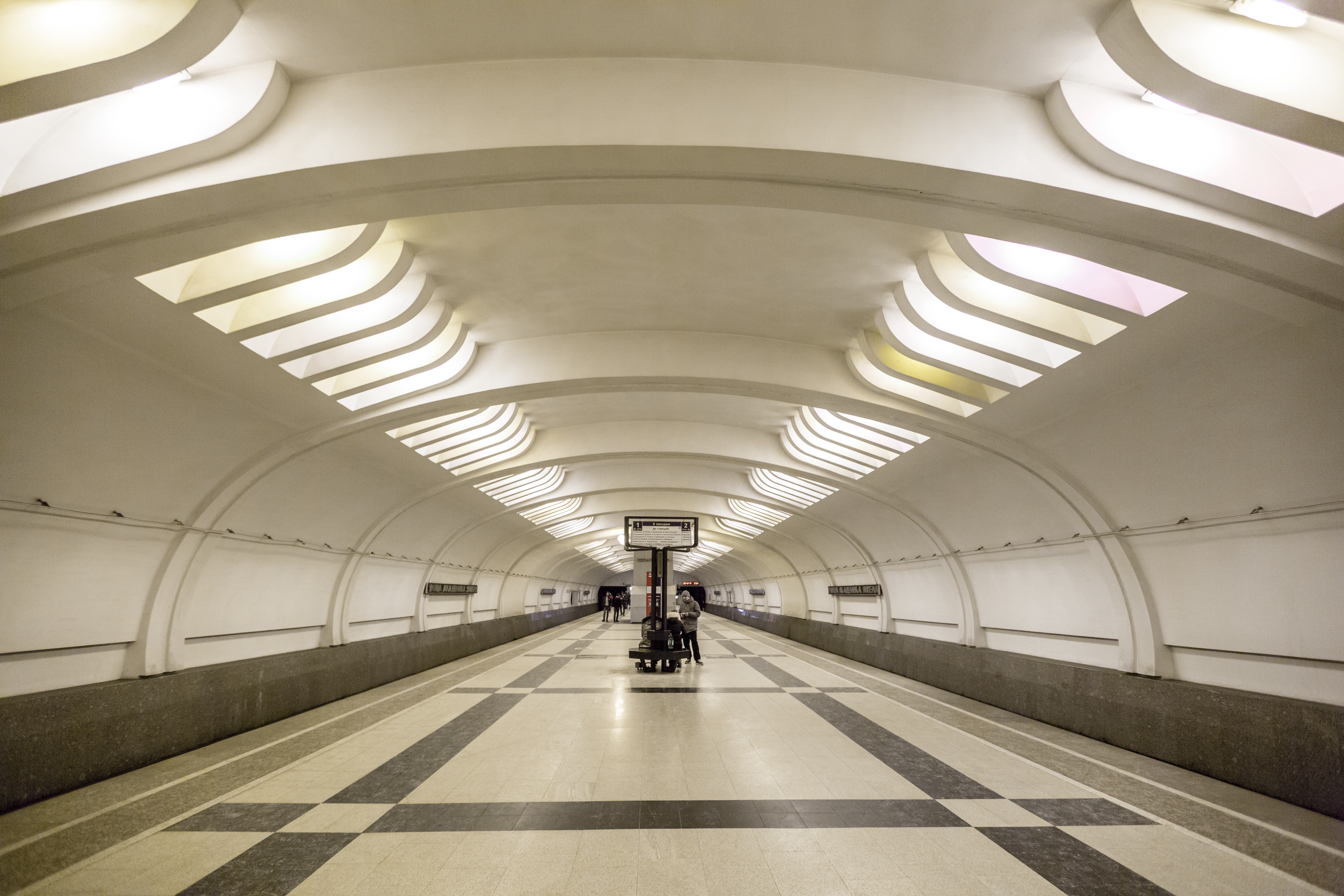

General information
- Location: Chertanovo Yuzhnoye District, Southern Administrative Okrug; Moscow; Russia
- Coordinates: 55.5949°N 37.6004°E
- System: Moscow Metro station
- Owner: Moskovsky Metropoliten
- Line: Serpukhovsko-Timiryazevskaya line
- Platforms: 1 island platform
- Tracks: 2

Construction
- Structure type: Shallow single-vault
- Platform levels: 1
- Parking: No

Other information
- Station code: 162

History
- Opened: 31 August 2000; 25 years ago

Services
Preceding station	Moscow Metro	Following station
Prazhskaya towards Altufyevo	Serpukhovsko-Timiryazevskaya line	Annino towards Bulvar Dmitriya Donskogo
Route map
Location
- Location within Moscow Metro

Ulitsa Akademika Yangelya (Russian: Улица академика Янгеля, lit. 'Street of Academician Yangel') is a Moscow Metro station in the Chertanovo Yuzhnoye District, Southern Administrative Okrug, Moscow. It is on the Serpukhovsko-Timiryazevskaya line, between Prazhskaya and Annino (Moscow Metro) stations.

The station is located at the crossing of Varshavskoye Highway with Akademika Yangelya Street (west) and Rossoshanskaya Street (east). It takes the name from Akademika Yangelya Street, which, in turn, was named after Mikhail Yangel, a leading missile designer. One of the proposed names for the station was also Rossoshanskaya, from another street at the crossing.

Ulitsa Akademika Yangelya was opened on 31 August 2000 and remained a terminal station until December 2001. The project was designed by architects Vladimir Filippov and Svetlana Belyakova.
