= Annino =

Annino may refer to:

- Annino (Moscow Metro), a station of Moscow Metro, Moscow, Russia
- Annino, Russia, name of several rural localities in Russia
- Annino, alternative name of the former Gorelovo air base in Leningrad Oblast, Russia
- Annino, former name of Şəmkir, Azerbaijan
