= Ogorodnikov =

Ogorodnikov (Russian: Огоро́дников) (masculine), or Ogorodnikova (Russian: Огоро́дникова; feminine) is a Russian surname, which is derived from the Russian word "огородник" (truck farmer). Notable people with the surname include:

- Aleksandr Ogorodnikov (born 1967), water polo player
- Alexander Ogorodnikov, Russian activist and Gulag survivor
- Andrei Ogorodnikov (born 1982), ice hockey player
- Vladimir Ogorodnikov (born 1945), Soviet Russian philosopher
- Nikolai Orgordnikov and Svetlana Ogorodnikova, convicted Soviet spies
- Sergei Ogorodnikov, several people
