= Zyablikovo =

Zyablikovo may refer to:

- Zyablikovo (Moscow Metro), a station of the Moscow Metro, Russia
- Zyablikovo District, Southern Administrative Okrug of Moscow, Russia
