= Annino (Moscow Metro) =

Moscow Metro station

Annino Аннино
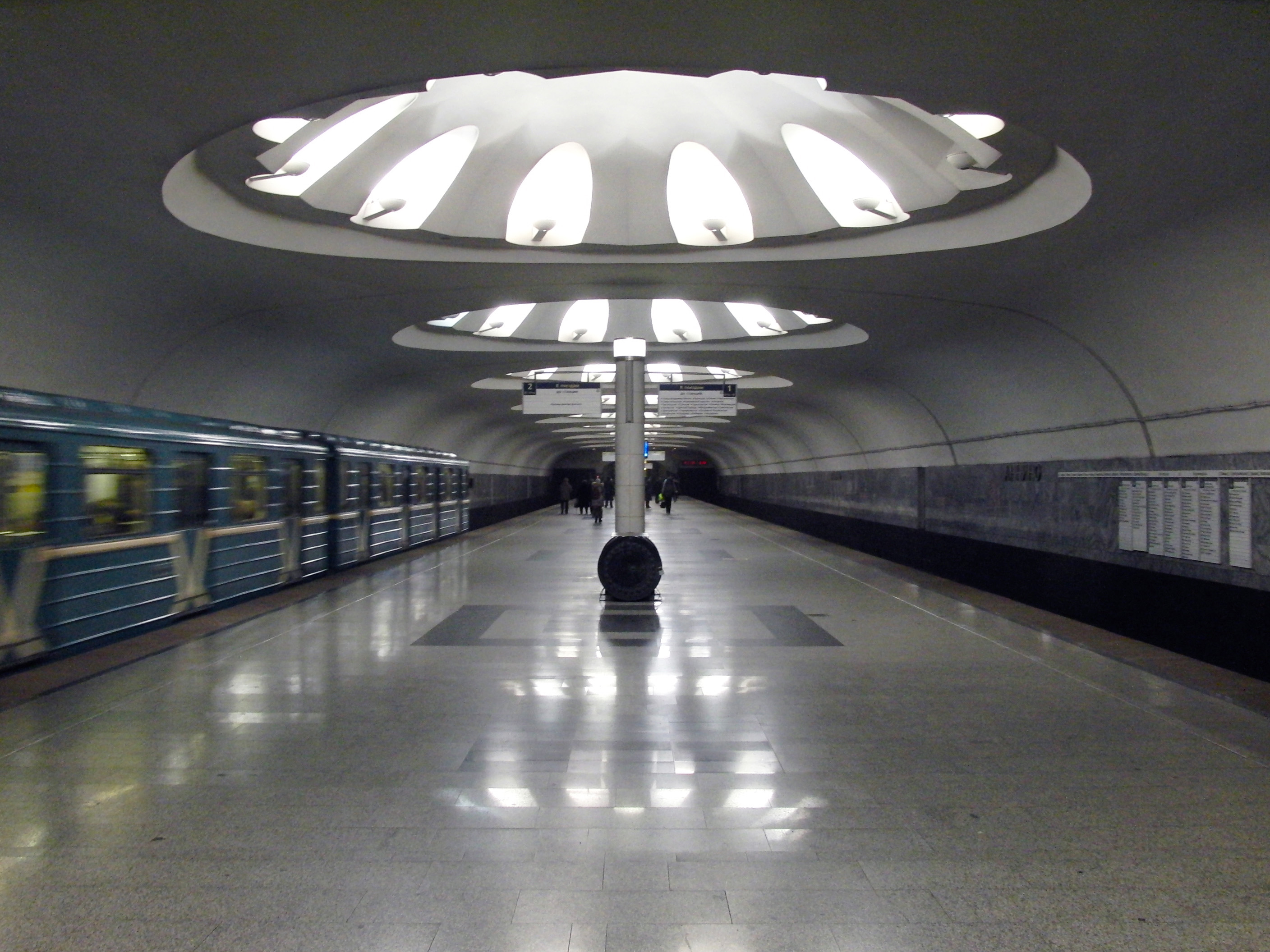

General information
- Location: Chertanovo Yuzhnoye District, Southern Administrative Okrug; Moscow; Russia
- Coordinates: 55.5828°N 37.5966°E
- System: Moscow Metro station
- Owner: Moskovsky Metropoliten
- Line: Serpukhovsko-Timiryazevskaya line
- Platforms: 1 island platform
- Tracks: 2
- Connections: Bus: 118, 249, 668, 819; Trolleybus: 40

Construction
- Structure type: Shallow single-vault
- Depth: 9
- Platform levels: 1
- Parking: Yes

Other information
- Station code: 163

History
- Opened: 12 December 2001; 24 years ago

Services
Preceding station	Moscow Metro	Following station
Ulitsa Akademika Yangelya towards Altufyevo	Serpukhovsko-Timiryazevskaya line	Bulvar Dmitriya Donskogo Terminus
Route map
Location
- Location within Moscow Metro

Annino (Russian: А́ннино, IPA: [ˈanʲnʲɪnə]) is a Moscow Metro station in the Chertanovo Yuzhnoye District, Southern Administrative Okrug, Moscow. It is on the Serpukhovsko-Timiryazevskaya Line, between Ulitsa Akademika Yangelya and Bulvar Dmitriya Donskogo stations.

Annino was opened on 12 December 2001.

== Architecture ==
The station has two vestibules. The north vestibule goes to Varshavskoye Shosse. The south was opened on 15 June 2012.

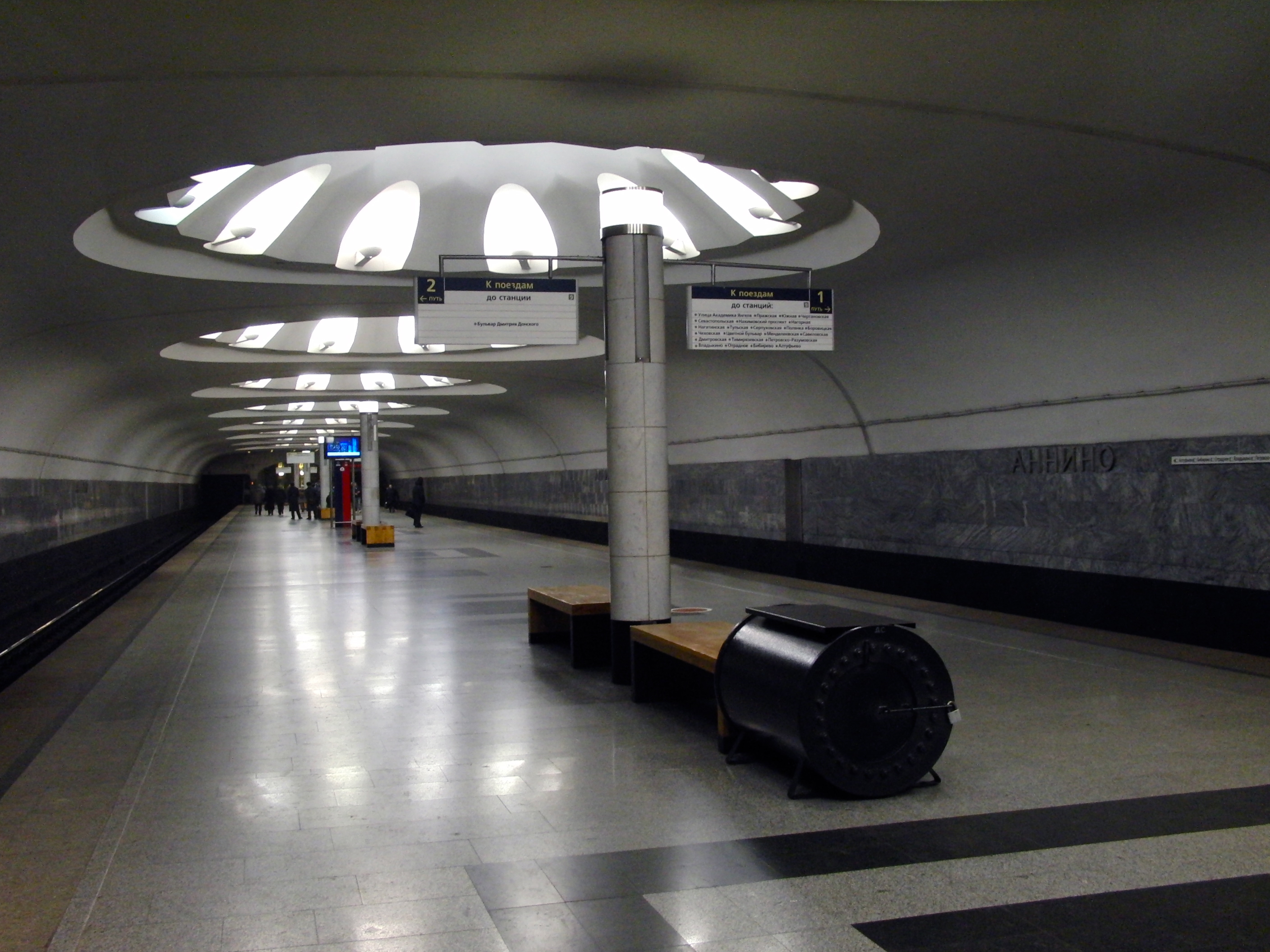
Annino station platform
