= Mikhail Yangel =

Soviet engineer and missile designer (1911–1971)

- Михаил Янгель
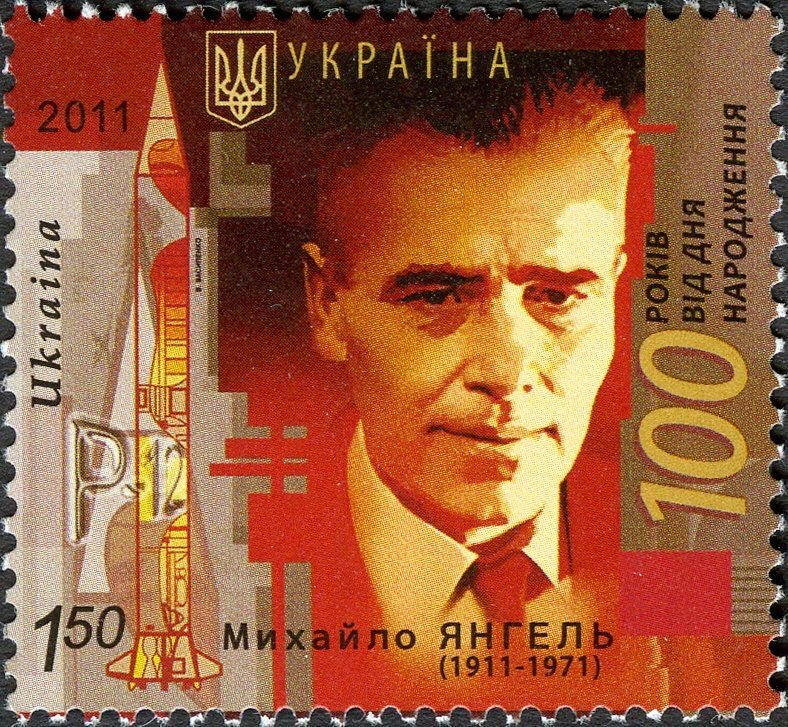
- 2011 Stamp of Ukraine depicting the image of Mikhail Yangel and R-12 rocket
- Born: 7 November 1911; Zyryanov settlement of Irkutsk gubernia, Russian Empire
- Died: 25 October 1971 (aged 59); Moscow, USSR
- Resting place: Novodevichy Cemetery, Moscow
- Engineering career
- Practice name: Rocket engineering
- Awards: Lenin Prize (1960), USSR State Prize (1967), 4 Orders of Lenin, Order of the October Revolution, medals

Signature
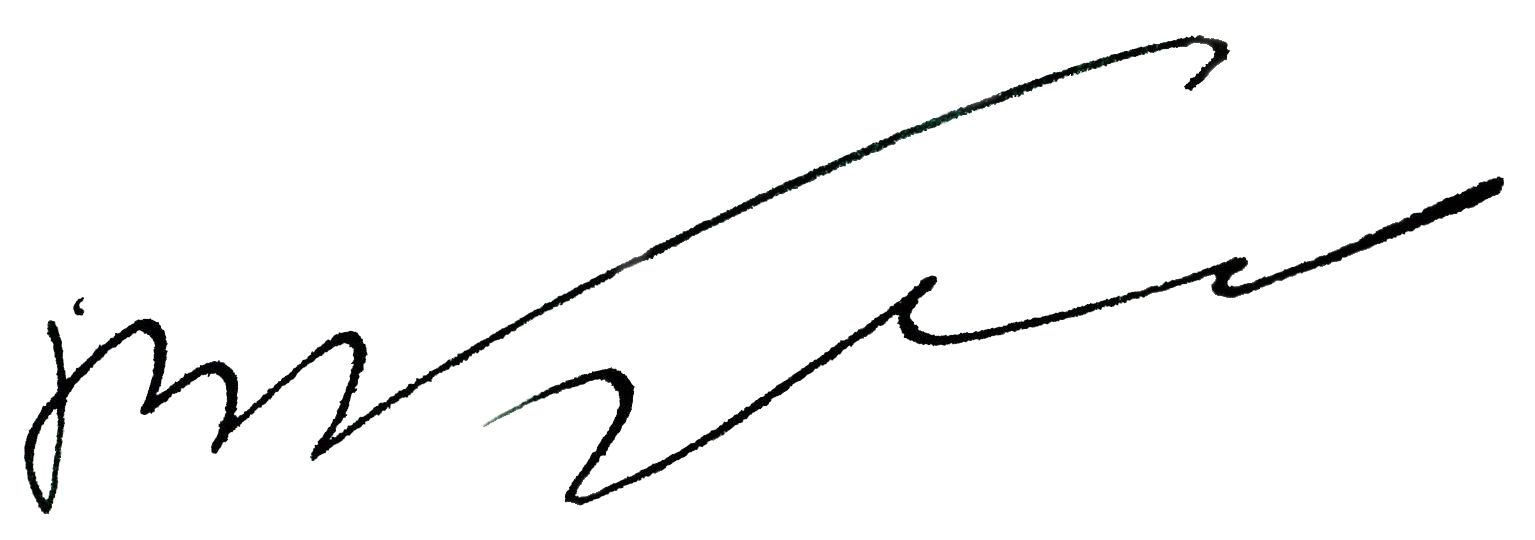

Mikhail Kuzmich Yangel (Russian: Михаил Кузьмич Янгель; 7 November 1911 – 25 October 1971), was a Soviet engineer born in Irkutsk who was the leading designer in the missile program of the former Soviet Union.

== Biography ==
Yangel was the grandson of a Russian political prisoner who had been deported to Siberia by the Tsarist regime.

Yangel's career started as an aviation engineer, after graduating from Moscow Aviation Institute in 1937. He worked with famous aircraft designers Nikolai Polikarpov and later, Artem Mikoyan. Then he moved to the field of ballistic missiles, where he first was in charge of guidance systems. As Sergei Korolev’s associate, he set up a rocket propulsion centre in Dnepropetrovsk in UkSSR which later formed the basis of his own OKB-586 design bureau in 1954. At first, Yangel’s facility served to mass-produce and further develop intercontinental ballistic missiles (ICBMs) in which area Yangel was a pioneer of storeable hypergolic fuels. His bureau designed the R-12, R-16 and R-36, whose launch vehicle adaptations are known as Kosmos, Tsyklon and Dnepr respectively. Yangel narrowly avoided death during the development of the R-16 in the 1960 Nedelin catastrophe.

Yangel's bureau was part of the Ministry of General Machine Building headed by Sergey Afanasyev.

He died in Moscow in 1971.

== Awards ==
For his outstanding work, Mikhail Yangel was awarded the Lenin Prize in 1960 and USSR State Prize in 1967. He was also awarded four Orders of Lenin, Order of the October Revolution, and numerous medals.

== Memory ==
Several notable places were named after Yangel:

- A street in the Chertanovo neighborhood in Moscow
- A Metro station Ulitsa Akademika Yangelya on the Serpukhovsko-Timiryazevskaya Line (near the above street)
- A street in Kyiv
- One of the two major streets in Baikonur (the other is in honor of his main rival Sergei Korolev)
- The crater Yangel on the Moon.

A minor planet 3039 Yangel discovered by Soviet astronomer Lyudmila Zhuravlyova in 1978 is named after him.

== See also ==
- Sergei Korolev
- Vladimir Chelomey

== Literature ==
- "Rockets and people" – B. E. Chertok, M: "mechanical engineering", 1999. ISBN 5-217-02942-0 (in Russian)
- "Testing of rocket and space technology - the business of my life" Events and facts - A.I. Ostashev, Korolyov, 2001.;
- "Baikonur. Korolev. Yangel." - M. I. Kuznetsk, Voronezh: IPF "Voronezh", 1997, ISBN 5-89981-117-X;
- A.I. Ostashev, Sergey Pavlovich Korolyov - The Genius of the 20th Century — 2010 M. of Public Educational Institution of Higher Professional Training MGUL ISBN 978-5-8135-0510-2.
- "Bank of the Universe" - edited by Boltenko A. C., Kyiv, 2014., publishing house "Phoenix", ISBN 978-966-136-169-9
- "S. P. Korolev. Encyclopedia of life and creativity" - edited by C. A. Lopota, RSC Energia. S. P. Korolev, 2014 ISBN 978-5-906674-04-3
- The official website of the city administration Baikonur - Honorary citizens of Baikonur
- "Space science city Korolev" - Author: Posamentir R. D. M: publisher SP Struchenevsky O. V., ISBN 978-5-905234-12-5
- "I look back and have no regrets. " - Author: Abramov, Anatoly Petrovich: publisher "New format" Barnaul, 2022. ISBN 978-5-00202-034-8
