= Andrei Nikolayev (military officer) =

Russian politician (born 1949)

- Андрей Николаев
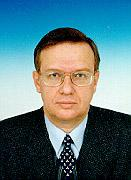

Member of the State Duma for Orekhovo–Borisovo
- In office 12 April 1998 – 29 December 2003
- Preceded by: Irina Khakamada
- Succeeded by: Konstantin Zatulin

Russian Border Guard director
- In office 6 August 1993 – 19 December 1997
- Preceded by: Vladimir Shlyakhtin
- Succeeded by: Nikolay Bordyuzha

Personal details
- Born: 21 April 1949 (age 77) Moscow, Soviet Union
- Education: Moscow RSFSR Supreme Soviet Higher Military Command School; Frunze Military Academy; General Staff Military Academy

Military service
- Allegiance: Soviet Union; Russia
- Branch/service: Soviet Armed Forces; Russian Armed Forces; Russian Border Service
- Years of service: 1967–1998
- Rank: Army general
- Commands: Border Service of Russia

Andrei Ivanovich Nikolayev (Russian: Андрей Иванович Николаев; born April 21, 1949) is a Soviet and Russian military leader, and a politician who holds the rank of General of the Army (1995). He served as director of the Federal Border Service of Russia from 1993 to 1997 and from 1998 to 2003 as a member of the State Duma.

== Biography ==
He was born April 21, 1949, in Moscow. A son of an officer, his father, Ivan Georgievich Nikolayev (1922–1985), retired with the rank of Colonel General from the post of First Deputy Chief of the General Staff of the Soviet Armed Forces. His mother, poetess Elena Dmitrievna Nikolayeva (née Elena Derenikovna Apresyan). In 1966, he entered the faculty of semiconductor and vacuum tube engineering of the Moscow Institute of Electronics and Mathematics, but after the first year he decided to become an officer. He was conscripted to the Soviet Armed Forces in 1967. Graduated from the Moscow RSFSR Supreme Soviet Higher Military Command School (1971), the Frunze Military Academy (1976), the Shaposhnikov Higher Officer Courses "Vystrel" (1978), and the Voroshilov Military Academy of the General Staff of the USSR Armed Forces (1988).

Until 1972, he served as a motorized rifle platoon commander in the Moscow Military District. From 1972 - motorized rifle company commander, from 1976 - motorized rifle battalion commander in the Southern Group of Forces in the Hungarian People's Republic.

Since 1977 he served as chief of staff of a motorized rifle regiment, since 1980 he served as commander of a motorized rifle regiment, since 1982 he served as chief of staff of a training motorized rifle division, since 1984 he served as commander of a training motorized rifle division in the Urals Military District. Since 1988 as chief of staff and deputy commander of the 6th combined arms army in the Leningrad Military District. Since July 1991 he served as commander of the 1st Guards Army in the Kiev Military District. He had a remarkably successful military career, receiving three military ranks ("captain", "lieutenant colonel", "colonel") ahead of schedule, which is an extremely rare occurrence in the officer corps.

Since February 1992 he served as commander of the 11th Guards Army in the Northwestern Group of Forces (former Baltic Military District). From June 1992 he served as First Deputy Chief of the Main Operations Directorate of the General Staff of the Russian Armed Forces. From December 23, 1992, he served as First Deputy Chief of the General Staff of the Russian Armed Forces.

In July 1993, after the tragic death of Russian border guards at the 12th outpost on the Tajik-Afghan border, Russian President Boris Yeltsin dismissed the leadership of the Russian Border Troops. Colonel General Nikolayev was soon appointed Commander of the Russian Border Troops and Deputy Minister of Security of Russia. In December 1993, his position was renamed, and he became Commander-in-Chief of the Border Troops of the Russian Federation. In December 1994, the Federal Border Service of the Russian Federation was created, and Nikolayev was then appointed its first director. He enjoyed high authority in the troops and in society. The military rank of General of the Army was awarded by the decree of the president of Russia dated November 17, 1995. In 1994–1997, he was simultaneously a member of the Security Council of Russia.

In December 1997, another conflict arose between Russia and Georgia over the location of the checkpoint of the Russian border outpost "Verkhniy Lars". By order of Nikolayev, the checkpoint of this outpost was moved closer to the Georgian checkpoint to prevent the smuggling of vodka from Georgia (after passing the Georgian checkpoint, cars with smuggled vodka turned off the highway and went deep into Russian territory along country roads). The relocation of the Russian checkpoint cut off this route for them. Immediately, powerful pressure arose on the Russian leadership from the leadership of Georgia and South Ossetia with the demand to return the Russian checkpoint to its previous location. Russian president Yeltsin demanded that the checkpoint be returned to its previous location. Nikolayev refused to carry out this order, went to the scene of the conflict, where he proved the error of such a decision in front of journalists from a number of TV channels. He was criticized by president Yeltsin ("Nikolayev! How is that possible, General?"). As a result, in the same December 1997, he submitted a report on his resignation from the post of Director of the Federal Border Service of the Russian Federation, which was granted. In June 1998, he was discharged from military service. The checkpoint was returned to its previous location, and with the beginning of military operations in the Chechen Republic in 1999, it was quietly returned to where it should be, according to the opinion of Nikolayev.

While in reserve, he became actively involved in politics. In April 1998, he won the by-election to the 2nd State Duma in the Orekhovo-Borisovsky electoral district of Moscow. One of the founders of the movement Union of People's Power and Labour in 1998, chairman of this movement. In August 1998, together with this movement, he joined the People's Patriotic Union of Russia.

In the 1999 parliamentary election to the 3rd State Duma, he was again elected as a deputy from the Orekhovo-Borisovsky single-mandate electoral district of Moscow from the electoral bloc "Bloc of General Andrei Nikolayev, Academician Svyatoslav Fyodorov". In the State Duma of the third convocation, he was a member of the "People's Deputy" group, chairman of the State Duma Defense Committee.

In the December 2003 parliamentary election he ran for the State Duma of the fourth convocation but was not elected.

In April 2004, he was appointed assistant to the prime minister of Russia Mikhail Fradkov on military-technical cooperation issues, and worked in this position until September 2007 (he was relieved of his duties due to the termination of Mikhail Fradkov's tenure. In January 2005, he was awarded the qualification rank of 2nc class Active State Councillor of the Russian Federation.

Since October 23, 2008 he served as Advisor to the General Director of JSC Concern RTI Systems.

He lives in Moscow, married and has two sons. He is the author of a series of journalistic books and memoirs, over 200 publications. Vice-president of the Military Leaders' Club, Honorary Member of the Academy of Military Sciences.

== Awards ==
- Order "For Merit to the Fatherland"
- Order "For Service to the Homeland in the Armed Forces of the USSR"
- Medal "For Distinction in the Protection of the State Borders"
- Jubilee Medal "300 Years of the Russian Navy"
- Medal "In Commemoration of the 850th Anniversary of Moscow"
- Jubilee Medal "In Commemoration of the 100th Anniversary of the Birth of Vladimir Ilyich Lenin"
- Medal "Veteran of the Armed Forces of the USSR"
- Jubilee Medal "50 Years of the Armed Forces of the USSR"
- Jubilee Medal "60 Years of the Armed Forces of the USSR"
- Jubilee Medal "70 Years of the Armed Forces of the USSR"
- Medal "For Impeccable Service"
- Dank Medal
