= Annino, Russia =

Annino (Russian: Аннино) is the name of several rural localities in Russia.

== Modern localities ==
- Annino, Bryansk Oblast, a village in Usokhsky Selsoviet of Trubchevsky District of Bryansk Oblast
- Annino, Ivanovo Oblast, a village in Kineshemsky District of Ivanovo Oblast
- Annino, Baryatinsky District, Kaluga Oblast, a village in Baryatinsky District, Kaluga Oblast
- Annino, Khvastovichsky District, Kaluga Oblast, a selo in Khvastovichsky District, Kaluga Oblast
- Annino, Ulyanovsky District, Kaluga Oblast, a village in Ulyanovsky District, Kaluga Oblast
- Annino, Leningrad Oblast, a logging depot settlement in Anninskoye Settlement Municipal Formation of Lomonosovsky District of Leningrad Oblast
- Annino, Lipetsk Oblast, a selo in Petrovsky Selsoviet of Gryazinsky District of Lipetsk Oblast
- Annino, Ruzsky District, Moscow Oblast, a selo in Kolyubakinskoye Rural Settlement of Ruzsky District of Moscow Oblast
- Annino, Serebryano-Prudsky District, Moscow Oblast, a selo in Mochilskoye Rural Settlement of Serebryano-Prudsky District of Moscow Oblast
- Annino, Volokolamsky District, Moscow Oblast, a village in Chismenskoye Rural Settlement of Volokolamsky District of Moscow Oblast
- Annino, Penza Oblast, a village in Malosergiyevsky Selsoviet of Tamalinsky District of Penza Oblast
- Annino, Mikhaylovsky District, Ryazan Oblast, a selo in Mishinsky Rural Okrug of Mikhaylovsky District of Ryazan Oblast
- Annino, Alexandro-Nevsky District, Ryazan Oblast, a settlement in Leninsky Rural Okrug of Alexandro-Nevsky District of Ryazan Oblast
- Annino, Samara Oblast, a selo in Privolzhsky District of Samara Oblast
- Annino, Saratov Oblast, a settlement in Yekaterinovsky District of Saratov Oblast
- Annino, Tula Oblast, a village in Zeleninskaya Rural Territory of Suvorovsky District of Tula Oblast
- Annino, Kesovogorsky District, Tver Oblast, a village in Kesovogorsky District, Tver Oblast
- Annino, Kimrsky District, Tver Oblast, a village in Kimrsky District, Tver Oblast
- Annino, Torzhoksky District, Tver Oblast, a village in Torzhoksky District, Tver Oblast
- Annino (Stolipinskoye Rural Settlement), Zubtsovsky District, Tver Oblast, a village in Zubtsovsky District, Tver Oblast; municipally, a part of Stolipinskoye Rural Settlement of that district
- Annino (Pogorelskoye Rural Settlement), Zubtsovsky District, Tver Oblast, a village in Zubtsovsky District, Tver Oblast; municipally, a part of Pogorelskoye Rural Settlement of that district
- Annino (Zubtsovskoye Rural Settlement), Zubtsovsky District, Tver Oblast, a village in Zubtsovsky District, Tver Oblast; municipally, a part of Zubtsovskoye Rural Settlement of that district
- Annino, Sudogodsky District, Vladimir Oblast, a village in Sudogodsky District, Vladimir Oblast
- Annino, Suzdalsky District, Vladimir Oblast, a village in Suzdalsky District, Vladimir Oblast
- Annino, Cherepovetsky District, Vologda Oblast, a selo in Anninsky Selsoviet of Cherepovetsky District of Vologda Oblast
- Annino, Sheksninsky District, Vologda Oblast, a village in Domshinsky Selsoviet of Sheksninsky District of Vologda Oblast

== Abolished localities ==
- Annino, Novgorod Oblast, a village in Zhirkovskoye Settlement of Demyansky District of Novgorod Oblast; abolished in December 2012
