= Evgeny Nifantiev =

Russian politician

Evgeny Nifantiev MP
- Евгений Нифантьев
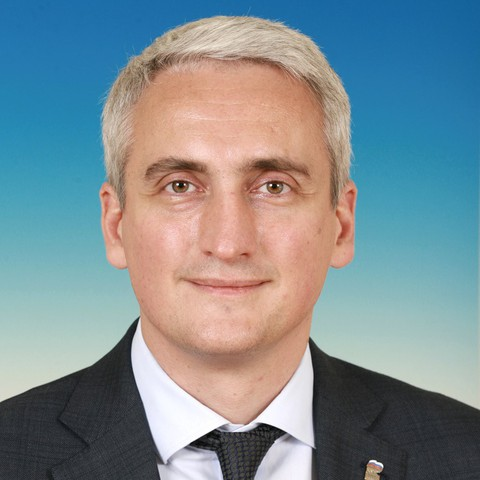

Member of the State Duma for Moscow
- Incumbent
- Assumed office 12 October 2021
- Preceded by: Lyubov Dukhanina
- Constituency: Orekhovo–Borisovo (No. 203)

Personal details
- Born: 14 September 1978 (age 48) Krasnoyarsk, RSFSR, USSR
- Party: United Russia
- Education: First Moscow State Medical University; RANEPA
- Occupation: Pharmacist

Evgeny Olegovich Nifantiev (Russian: Евгений Олегович Нифантьев; born 14 September 1978) is a Russian political figure and a deputy of the 8th State Duma.

After graduating from the First Moscow State Medical University, Nifantiev founded and headed the pharmacy holding titled “Neopharm.” In 2005–2006, he held the position of head of the department for licensing, supervision and control of medical and pharmaceutical activities of the Office of the Federal Service for Surveillance in Healthcare (Moscow and the Moscow Oblast). In 2011, he was included in the reserve of managerial personnel under the patronage of the President of Russia. In 2019, he became a member of the Civic Chamber of Moscow. He has been a deputy of the 8th State Duma since October 2021, being elected as a member of United Russia from the Orekhovo–Borisovo constituency during the election in September of the same year.

== Sanctions ==
He was sanctioned by the UK government in 2022 in relation to the Russo-Ukrainian War.
