= Shipilovo =

Shipilovo Шипилово
- Village
- Location within Vladimir Oblast Location within Russia
- Coordinates: 55°57′N 40°40′E
- Country: Russia
- Region: Vladimir Oblast
- District: Sudogodsky District
- Time zone: UTC+3:00

Shipilovo (Russian: Шипилово) is a rural locality (a village) in Golovinskoye Rural Settlement, Sudogodsky District, Vladimir Oblast, Russia. The population was 43 as of 2010.

== Geography ==
Shipilovo is located on the Kamenka River, 14 km west of Sudogda (the district's administrative centre) by road. Druzhnoye is the nearest rural locality.
