= Orekhovo-Borisovo Yuzhnoye District =

Orekhovo-Borisovo Yuzhnoye District Район Орехово-Борисово Южное (Russian)
- District
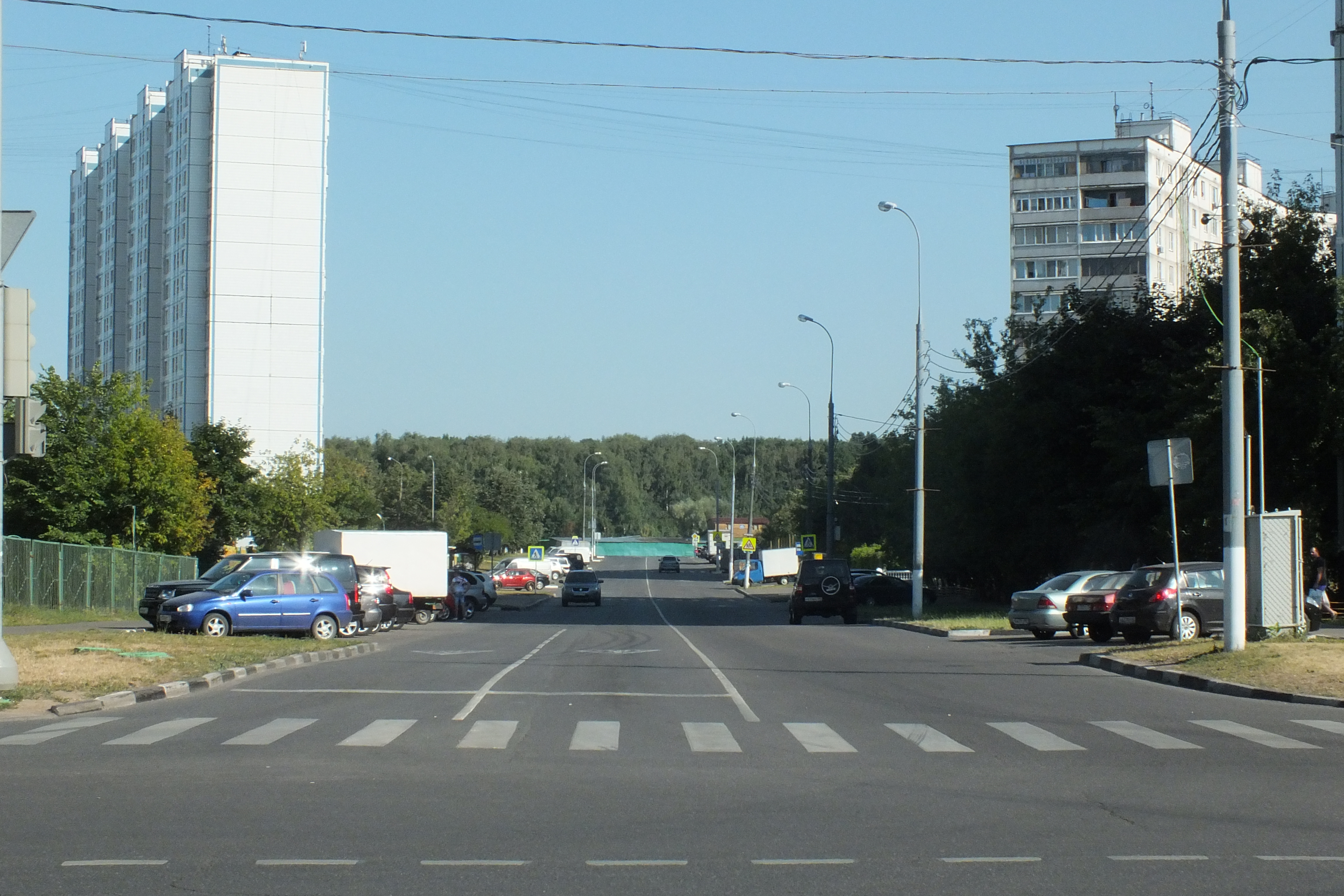
- Tambovskaya Street in Orekhovo-Borisovo Yuzhnoye District

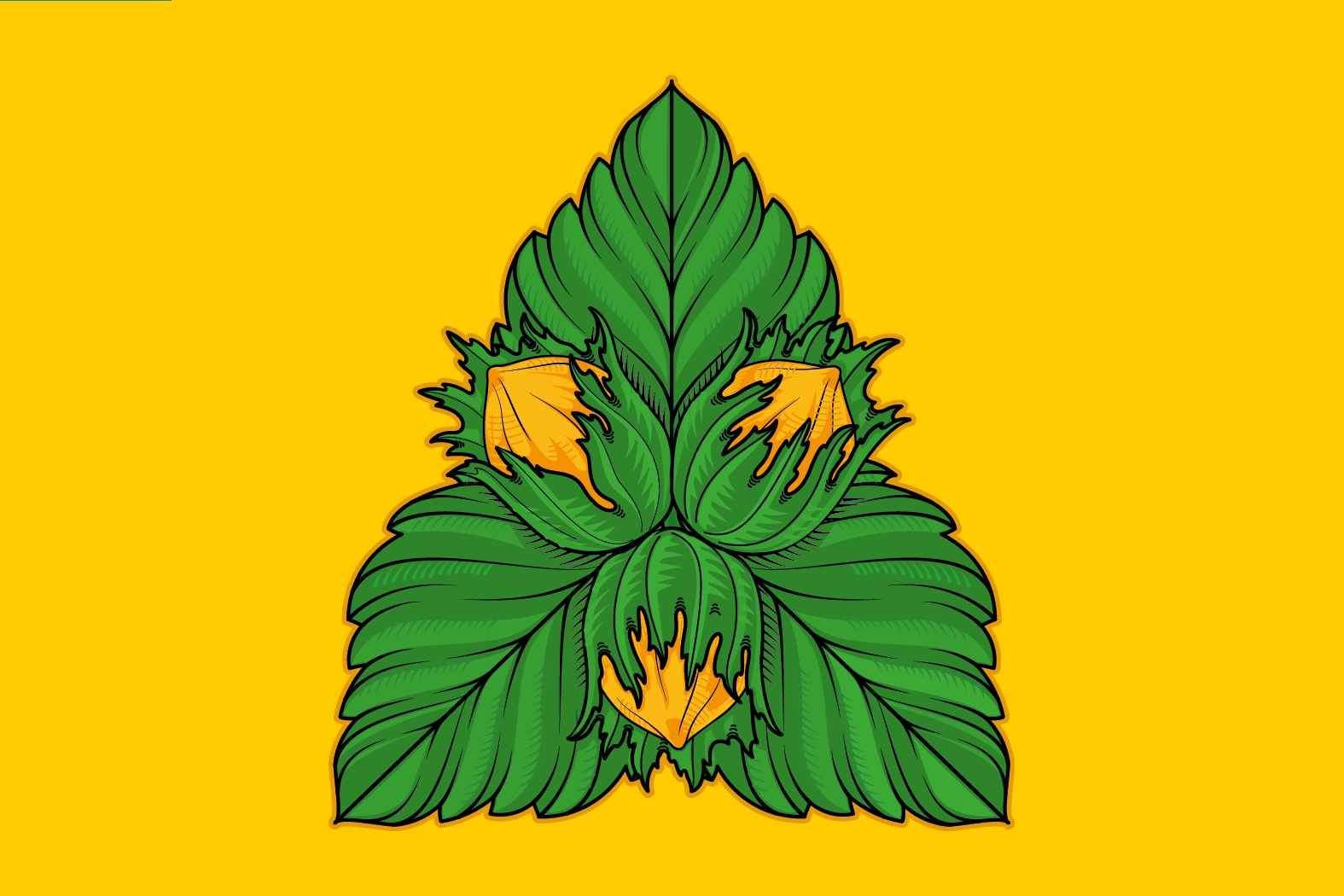
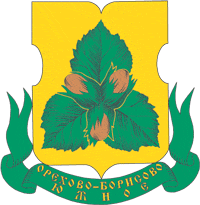
- Flag Coat of arms
- Location of Orekhovo-Borisovo Yuzhnoye District in the federal city of Moscow (pre-2012 map)
- Coordinates: 55°36′N 37°44′E
- Country: Russia
- Federal subject: Federal city of Moscow

Area
  - Total: 7.197 km^{2} (2.779 sq mi)

Population (2010 Census)
  - Total: 145,588
  - Estimate (2013): 147,421
  - Density: 20,230/km^{2} (52,390/sq mi)

Municipal structure
  - Municipally incorporated as: Orekhovo-Borisovo Yuzhnoye Municipal Okrug
- Time zone: UTC+
- OKTMO ID: 45922000
- Website: http://orehovo-borisovo-juzhnoe.mos.ru

Population of Orekhovo-Borisovo Yuzhnoye District
- 2010 Census: 145,588
- 2002 Census: 137,965

Orekhovo-Borisovo Yuzhnoye District (Russian: райо́н Оре́хово-Бори́сово Ю́жное) is a territorial division (a district, or raion) in Southern Administrative Okrug, one of the 125 in the federal city of Moscow, Russia. It is located in the south of the federal city. The area of the district is 7.197 square kilometers (2.779 sq mi). As of the 2010 Census, the total population of the district was 145,588.

== History ==
The district is located on the spot of former villages of Orekhovo, Borisovo, Shipilovo, Zyablikovo, and Brateyevo. In the early 1970s, mass housing construction was started in the area, and a microdistrict was built there.

== Municipal status ==
As a municipal division, the district is incorporated as Orekhovo-Borisovo Yuzhnoye Municipal Okrug.
