= Vladimir Ogorodnikov =

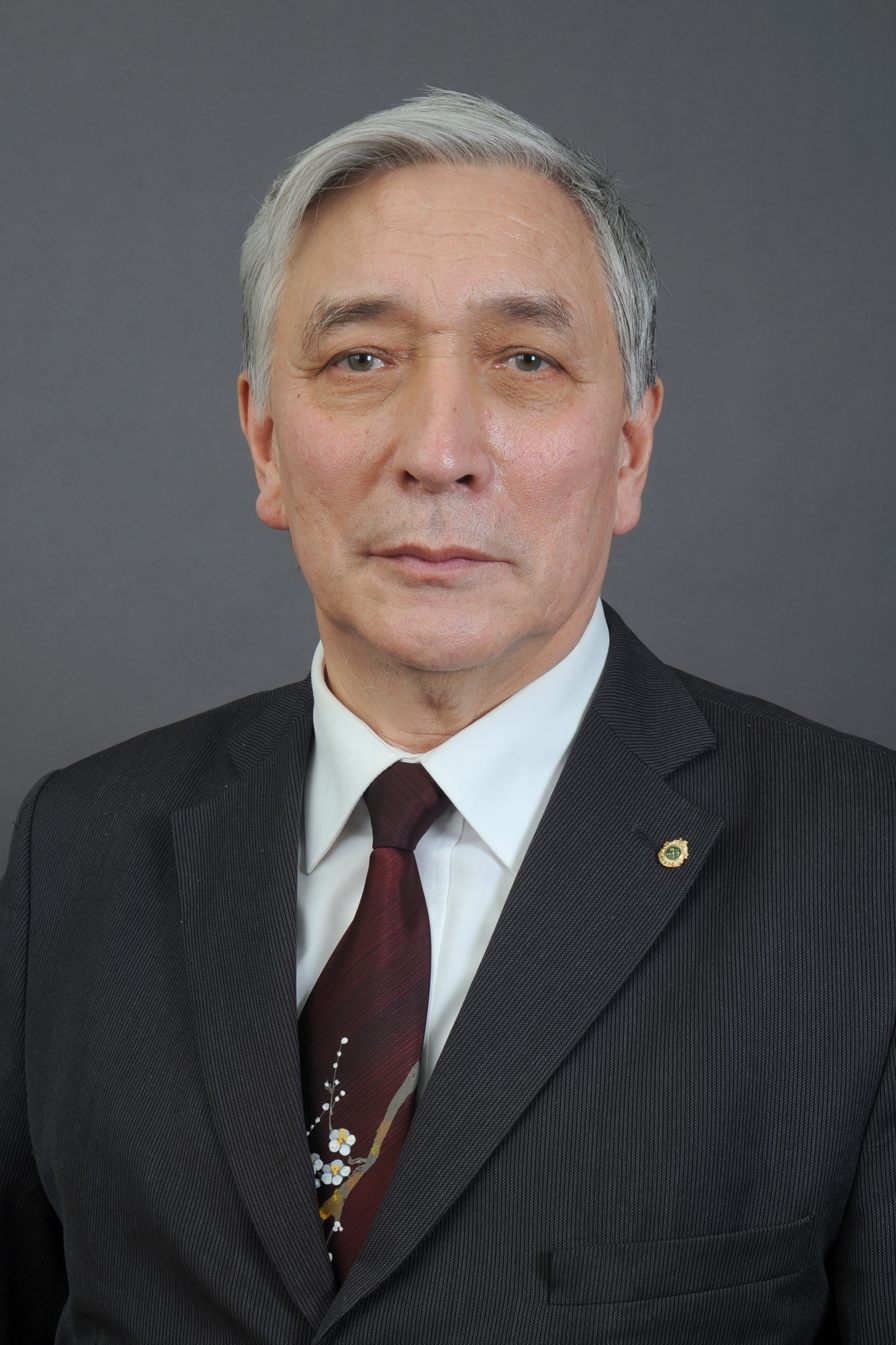
- Born: July 10, 1945; Saint Petersburg
- Employer: Northwestern Management Institute; St. Petersburg State Transport University

Vladimir Petrovich Ogorodnikov (Russian: Владимир Петрович Огородников; born 10 July 1945 in Leningrad) is a Soviet Russian philosopher. Doktor Nauk (1987), Honorary Professor at the St. Petersburg State Transport University (2014), Professor at the A.F. Mozhaysky Military-Space Academy (since February 2016), Member of the Petrovskaya Academy of Sciences and Arts (2003), Corresponding Member of the Russian Academy of Natural Sciences. He is a Specialist in Theory of Determinism.

== Career ==
In 1969-73 he was a komsomol worker.

He graduated from the LGU Faculty of Philosophy in 1972. Candidate of Sciences (1978), Doktor Nauk (1987). In 1989 he received the title of Professor.

From 1991 to 2016, Ogorodnikov headed the Department of Philosophy at the St. Petersburg State Transport University.

He is married and has two daughters.

Ogorodnikov is the author more than 90 works including 9 monographs.

He is a member of the Ideological Commission of the Russian Communist Workers Party.

== Honors and awards ==
- Jubilee Medal "Twenty Years of Victory in the Great Patriotic War 1941–1945" (1965)
- Jubilee Medal "In Commemoration of the 100th Anniversary of the Birth of Vladimir Ilyich Lenin" (1970)
- Medal "Veteran of Labour" (1990)
- Medal "In Commemoration of the 300th Anniversary of Saint Petersburg"
- Honorary Professor at the St. Petersburg State Transport University (2014)
