= Annino, Cherepovetsky District, Vologda Oblast =

Annino Аннино
- Selo
- Location within Vologda Oblast Location within Russia
- Coordinates: 59°35′N 37°39′E
- Country: Russia
- Region: Vologda Oblast
- District: Cherepovetsky District
- Time zone: UTC+3:00

Annino (Russian: Аннино) is a rural locality (a selo) in Voskresenskoye Rural Settlement, Cherepovetsky District, Vologda Oblast, Russia. The population was 38 as of 2002.

== Geography ==
Annino is located 67 km (42 mi) northwest of Cherepovets (the district's administrative centre) by road. Trofimovo is the nearest rural locality.
