= Varshavskoye Highway =

Highway in Moscow, Russia

Coordinates: 55°38′27″N 37°37′11″E

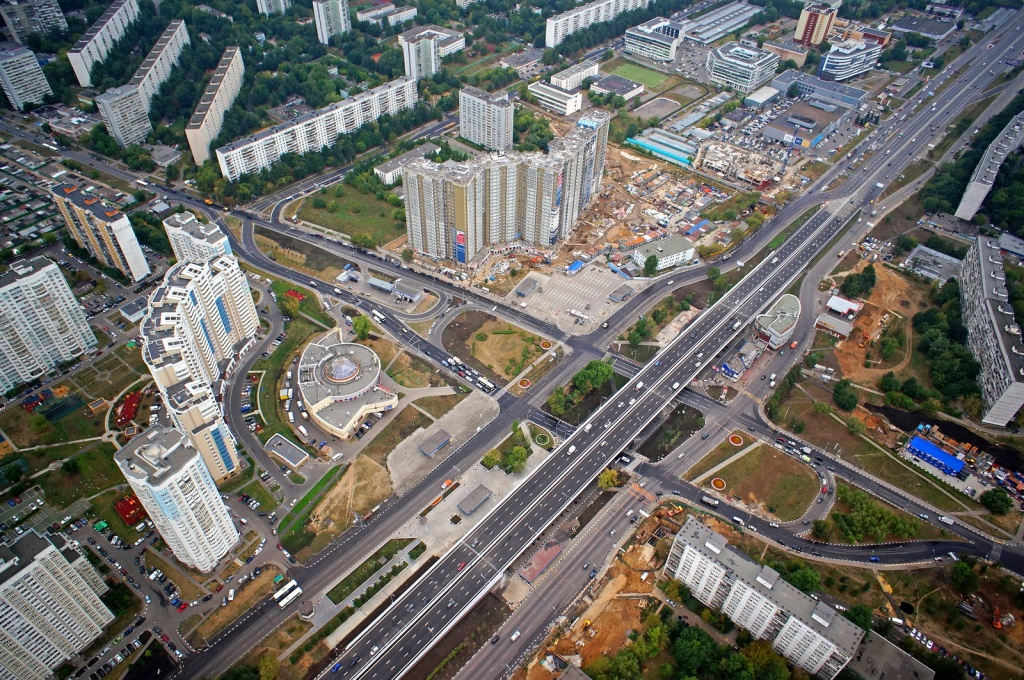
- Intersection with Academic Yangel Street in Chertanovo Yuzhnoye
- Interactive map of Varshavskoye Highway
- Native name: Варшавское шоссе (Russian)
- Length: 22.5 km (14.0 mi)
- Location: Moscow; Southern Administrative Okrug; South-Western Administrative Okrug; Novomoskovsky Administrative Okrug

Varshavskoye Highway (Russian: Варшавское шоссе, literally Warsaw Highway) is a major street in Moscow, Russia, continued beyond the city limit at Moscow Ring Road into Moscow Oblast as a backup route for M2 highway, a major trunk road. It continues the Bolshaya Tulskaya Street of central Moscow, and close from its start the Kashirskoye Highway branches from it.
