= Moskvorechye-Saburovo District =

Moskvorechye-Saburovo District Москворечье-Сабурово
- District
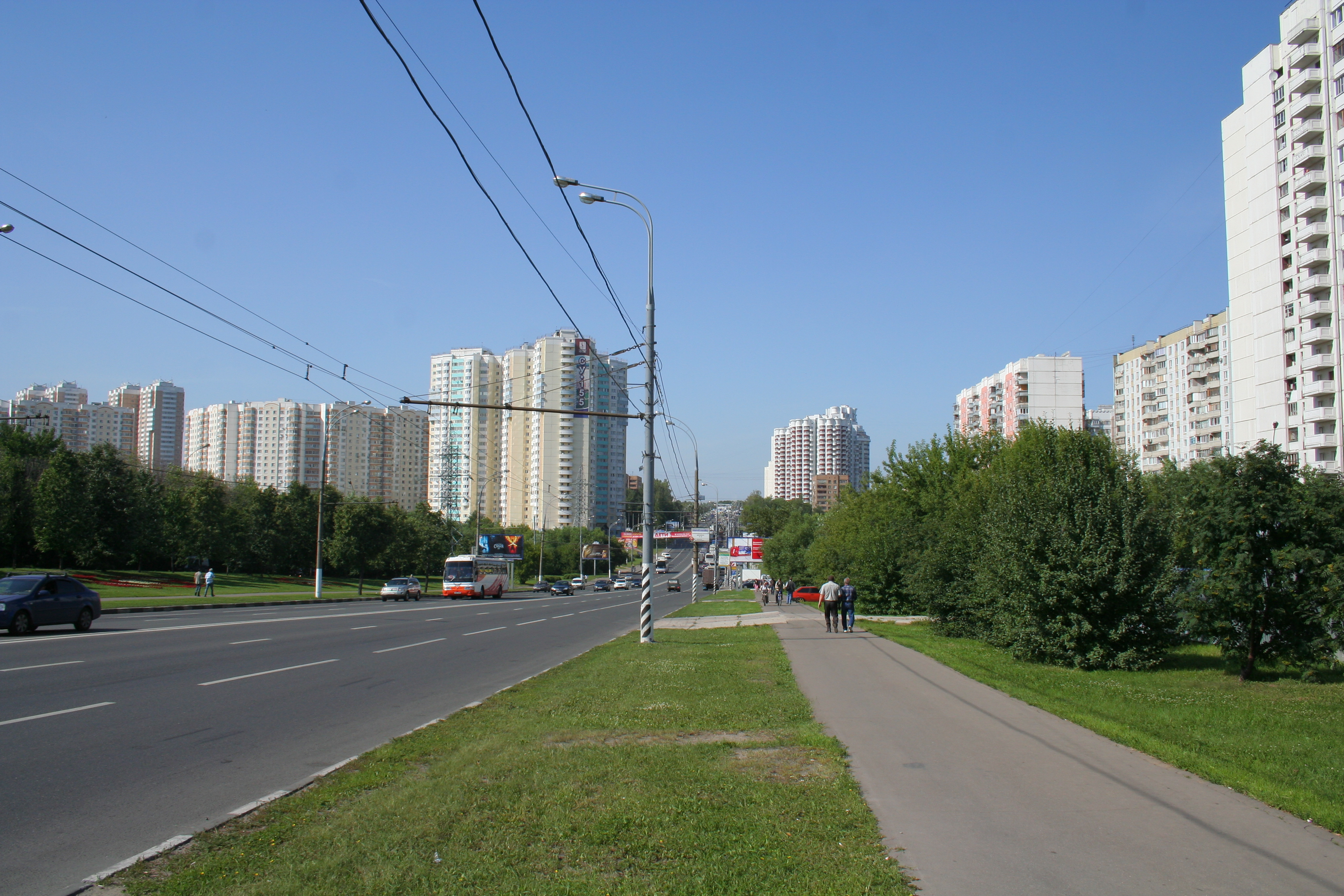

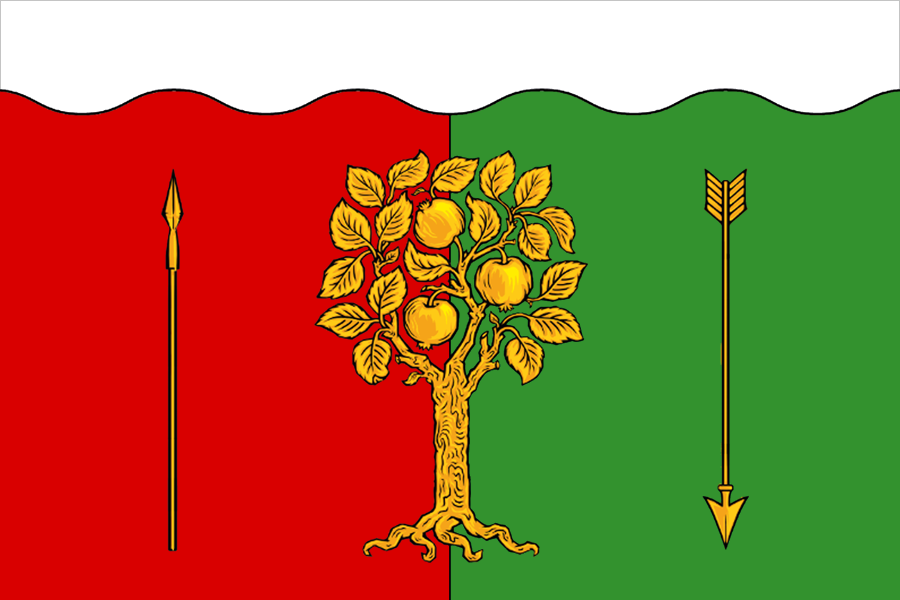
- Flag
- Location of Moskvorechye-Saburovo District on the map of Moscow
- Coordinates: 55°38′47″N 37°38′57″E
- Country: Russia
- Federal subject: Moscow
- Time zone: UTC+3 (MSK)
- OKTMO ID: 45917000
- Website: https://moskvoreche-saburovo.mos.ru/

Moskvorechye-Saburovo District (Russian: райо́н Москворе́чье-Сабу́рово) is an administrative district (raion) of Southern Administrative Okrug, and one of the 125 raions of Moscow, Russia. The area of the district is 9.30 square kilometers (3.59 sq mi).

== See also ==
- Administrative divisions of Moscow
