= Alexander Ogorodnikov =

Russian dissident

Alexander Ioilyevich Ogorodnikov
- Александр Иоильевич Огородников
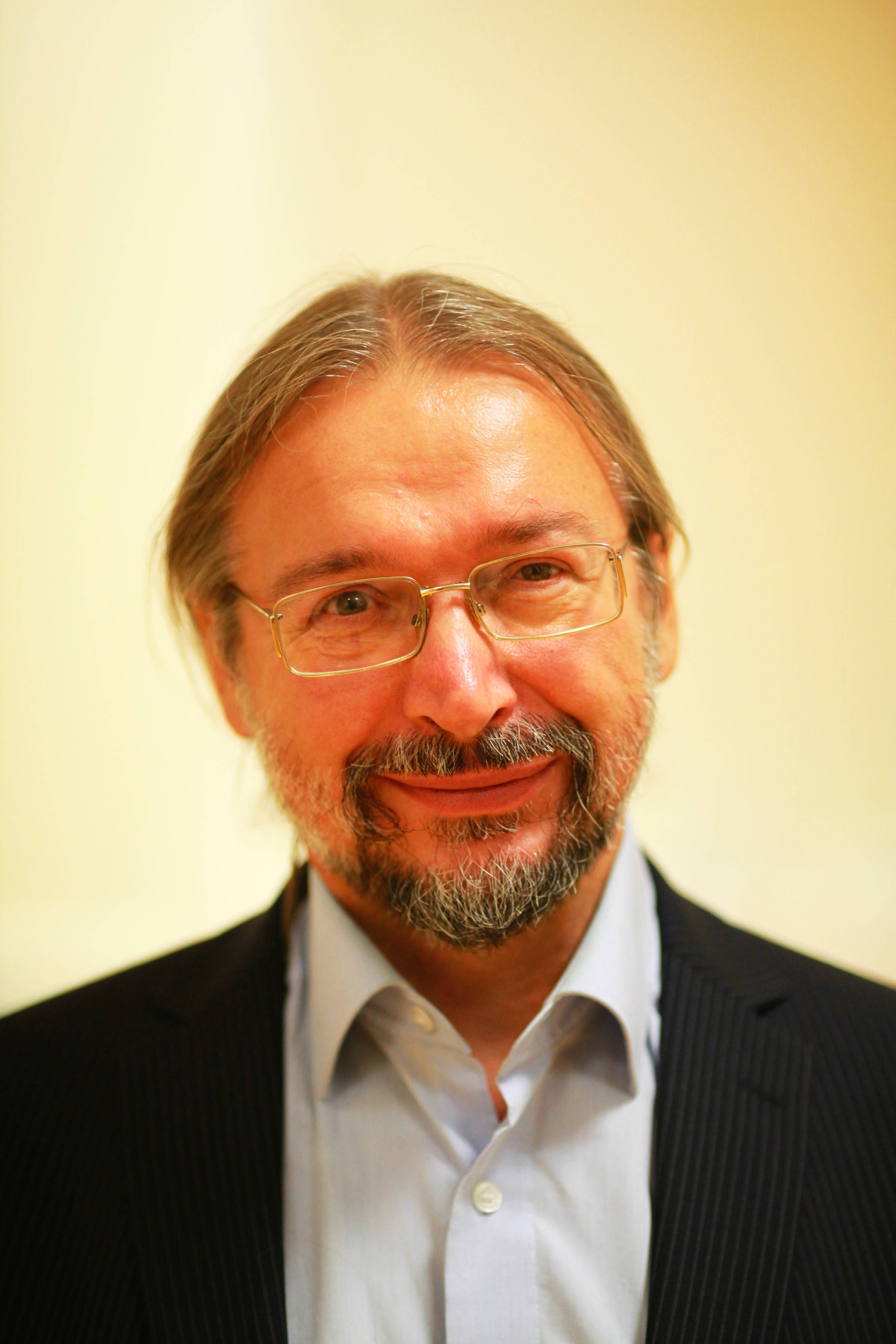
- Alexander Ogorodnikov
- Born: May 26, 1950 (age 75); Chistopol, Tatar ASSR, Soviet Union
- Citizenship: Soviet Union (1950–1991) → Russian Federation (1991–present)
- Known for: human rights activism
- Movement: dissident movement in the Soviet Union

Alexander Ioilyevich Ogorodnikov (Russian: Алекса́ндр Иои́льевич Огоро́дников, born 26 May 1950, Chistopol, Tatar ASSR) is a former chairman of the Russian Orthodox Argentov Seminar, peace activist, political prisoner and founder of several Russian humanitarian organizations.

Alexander Ogorodnikov was jailed during one of the Soviet Union’s most aggressive crackdowns on religious activity since the Stalinist era. The repressive policies of Stalin had been lightened by Khrushchev, but during the 1970s the communist government reinforced its policy of using the state to rid society of religious influence.

His father was a member of the Communist Party, while his grandmother had him secretly baptized. Alexander was singled out because his convictions defied Soviet “scientific” doctrine on the eradication of religious belief: anyone educated in the Soviet schools or in communism but remaining religious was deemed mentally ill, and Alexander converted after receiving his communist education in Soviet schools.

In 1974, as a Russian Orthodox Neophyte, Alexander founded a philosophical society with a religious basis. Alexander had been a graduate student at the University of the Urals in Sverdlovsk, and was expelled for attempting to make a film about religious life. In 1976, at the age of 25, Alexander was jailed in a psikhushka, an institution that in the West would be jokingly referred to as a hospital “for the criminally insane,” and he received neuroleptics. The legal basis for Alexander’s confinement was that his religious conviction was a mental disorder, due to its beginning and persistence coming after his education. Public protest forced the Soviet authorities to release him.

Alexander was again jailed from 1978 until 1987, when he was released by Gorbachev under the Glasnost. Shortly after the fall of communism Alexander returned to Moscow in 1995 and set up the Christian Democratic Union of Russia and the Christian Mercy Society. In 1995 Alexander started what was among other things a drug treatment facility, the Island of Hope.

In 1999 Alexander was interviewed following a Russian Orthodox Liturgy in Amsterdam, Netherlands, describing in detail life in a Soviet Gulag, specifically Perm 36, near the Siberian border where he had been jailed.
