= Tsaritsyno District =

- District
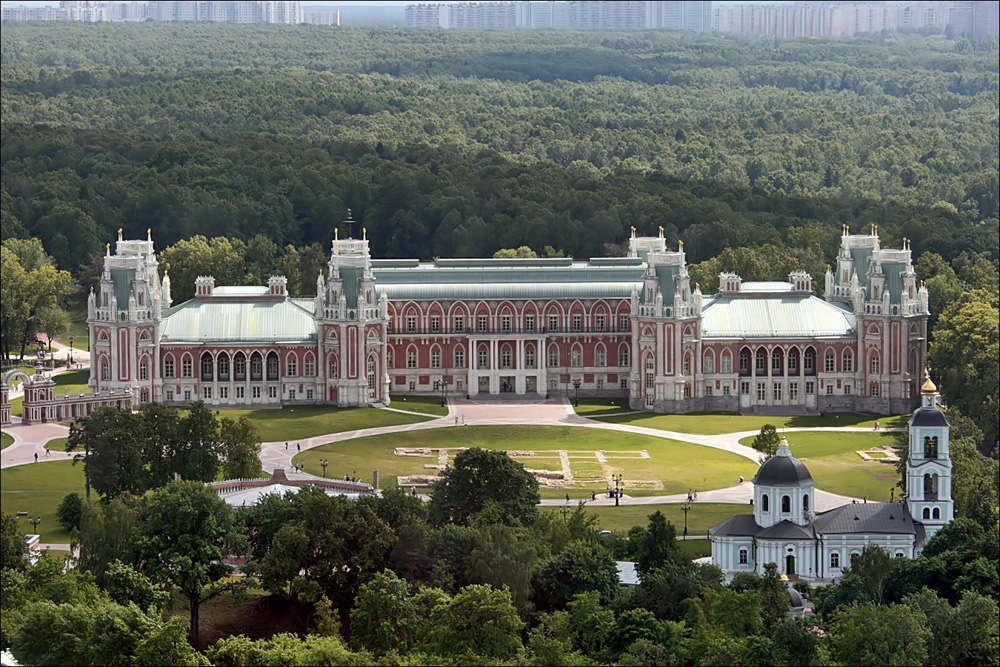
- The grand palace in Tsaritsyno

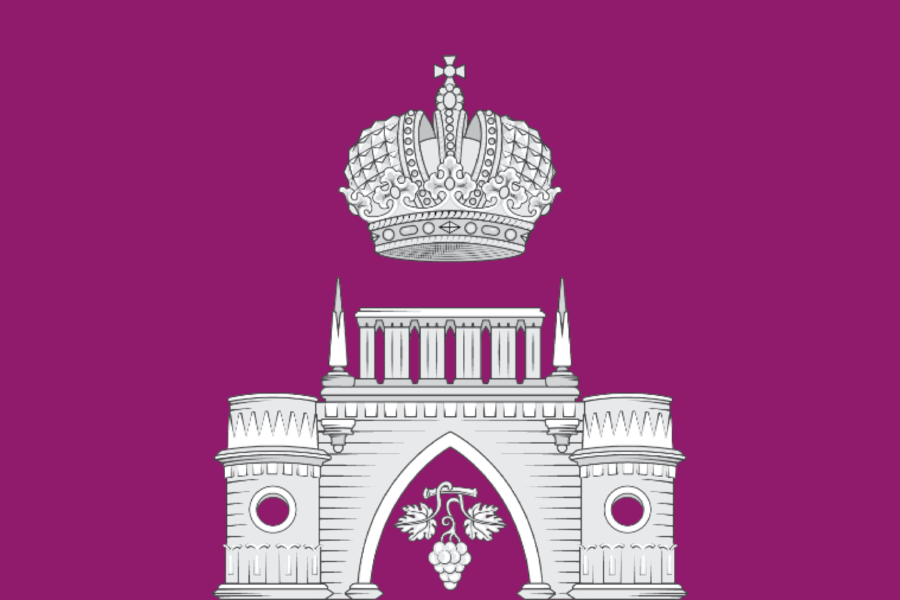
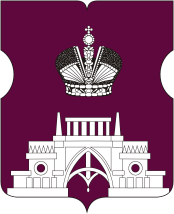
- Flag Coat of arms
- Location of Tsaritsyno District on the map of Moscow
- Coordinates: 55°37′N 37°40′E
- Country: Russia
- Federal subject: Moscow
- Time zone: UTC+
- OKTMO ID: 45923000
- Website: http://tsaricino.mos.ru/

Tsaritsyno (Russian: Царицыно, IPA: [tsɐˈrʲitsɨnə]) is a district within the Southern Administrative Okrug of Moscow. Area: 426,2 ha. Its current name is traced back to 1775. Previously, Tsaritsyno was known under several other names: the Chernogryaznaya Waste (from 1589), Chernaya Gryaz (before 1683/84 and from 1612), Bogorodskoye settlement (after 1684) and Lenino (September 28, 1918 – August 1991). Tsaritsyno hosts such landmarks as Tsaritsyno Palace and Arshinovskiy Forest Park.

In 1960, Lenino was incorporated into the Proletarsky District of Moscow and, in 1968, to Krasnogvardeysky District.
