= Chertanovo Yuzhnoye District =

Chertanovo Yuzhnoye District Чертаново Южное (Russian)
- District
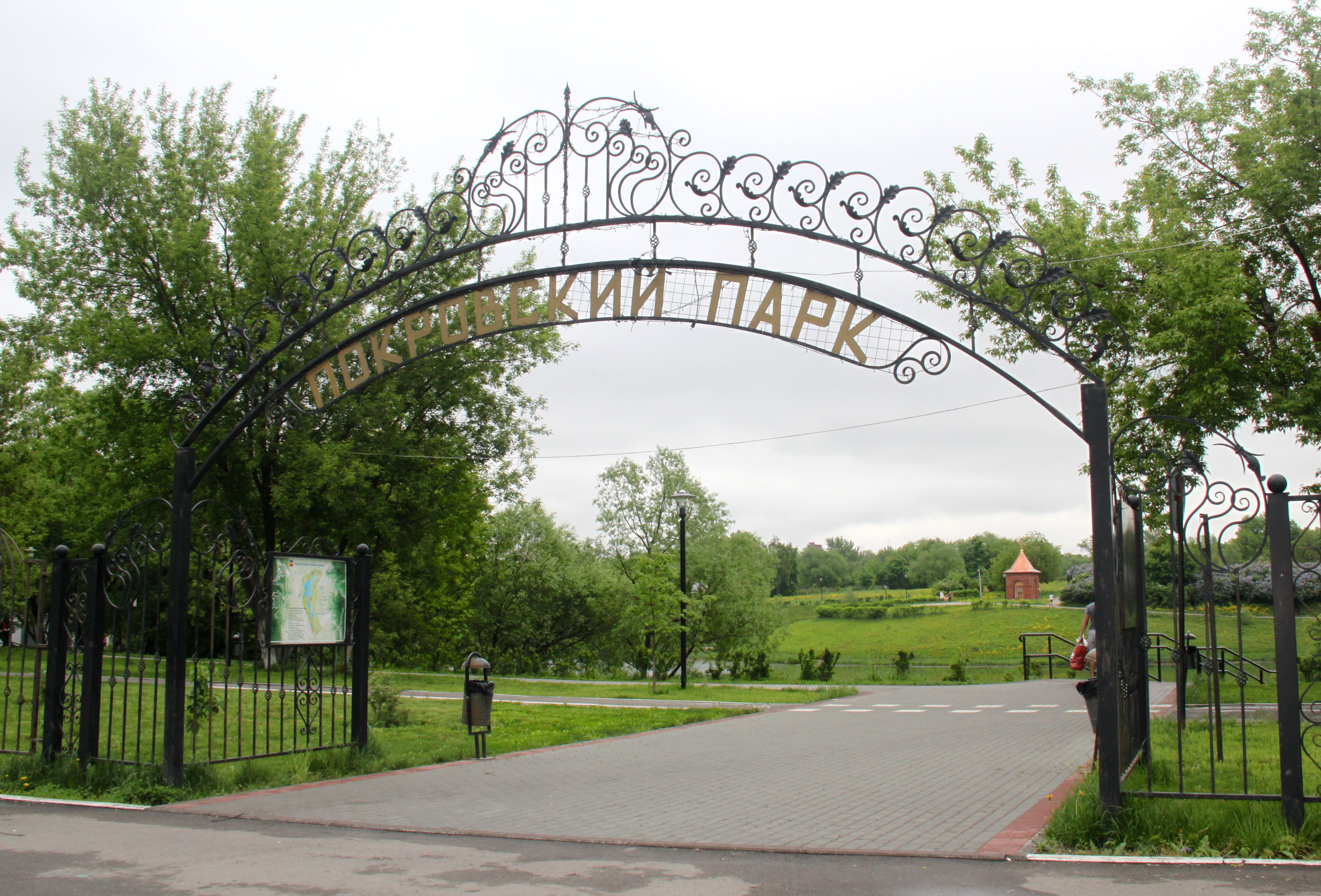
- Pokrovsky Park, Chertanovo Yuzhoye District

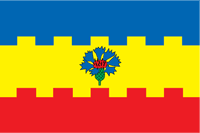
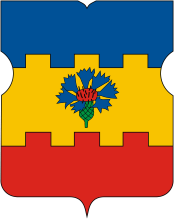
- Flag Coat of arms
- Location of Chertanovo Yuzhnoye District on the map of Moscow
- Coordinates: 55°35′35″N 37°36′25″E
- Country: Russia
- Federal subject: Moscow
- Time zone: UTC+
- OKTMO ID: 45926000
- Website: https://chertanovo-juzhnoe.mos.ru/

Chertanovo Yuzhnoye District (Russian: район Чертаново Южное) is an administrative district (raion) of Southern Administrative Okrug, and one of the 125 raions of Moscow, Russia.

== See also ==
- Administrative divisions of Moscow
