= Zyablikovo District =

- District
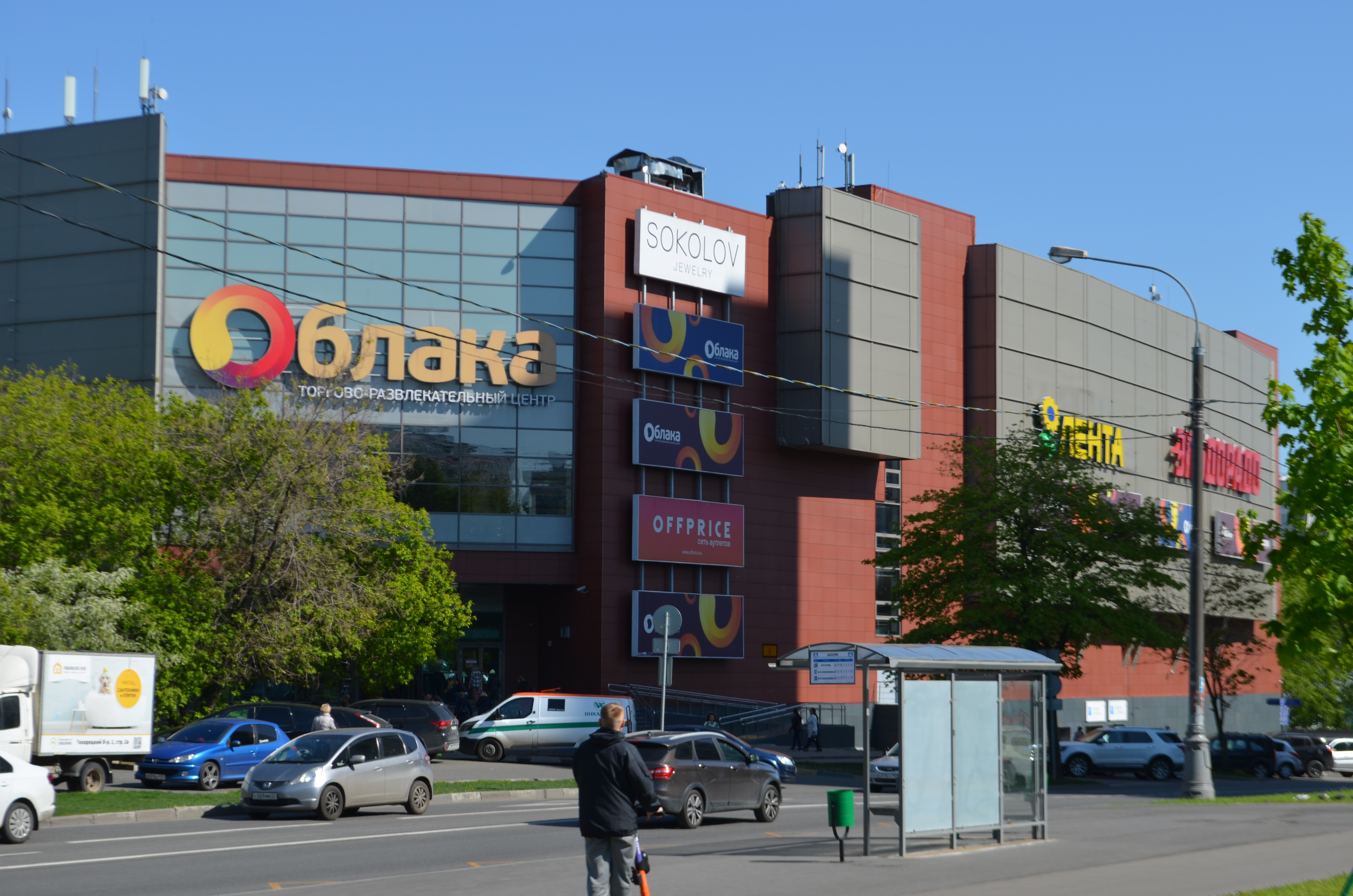
- Shopping center "Oblaka", Zyablikovo District

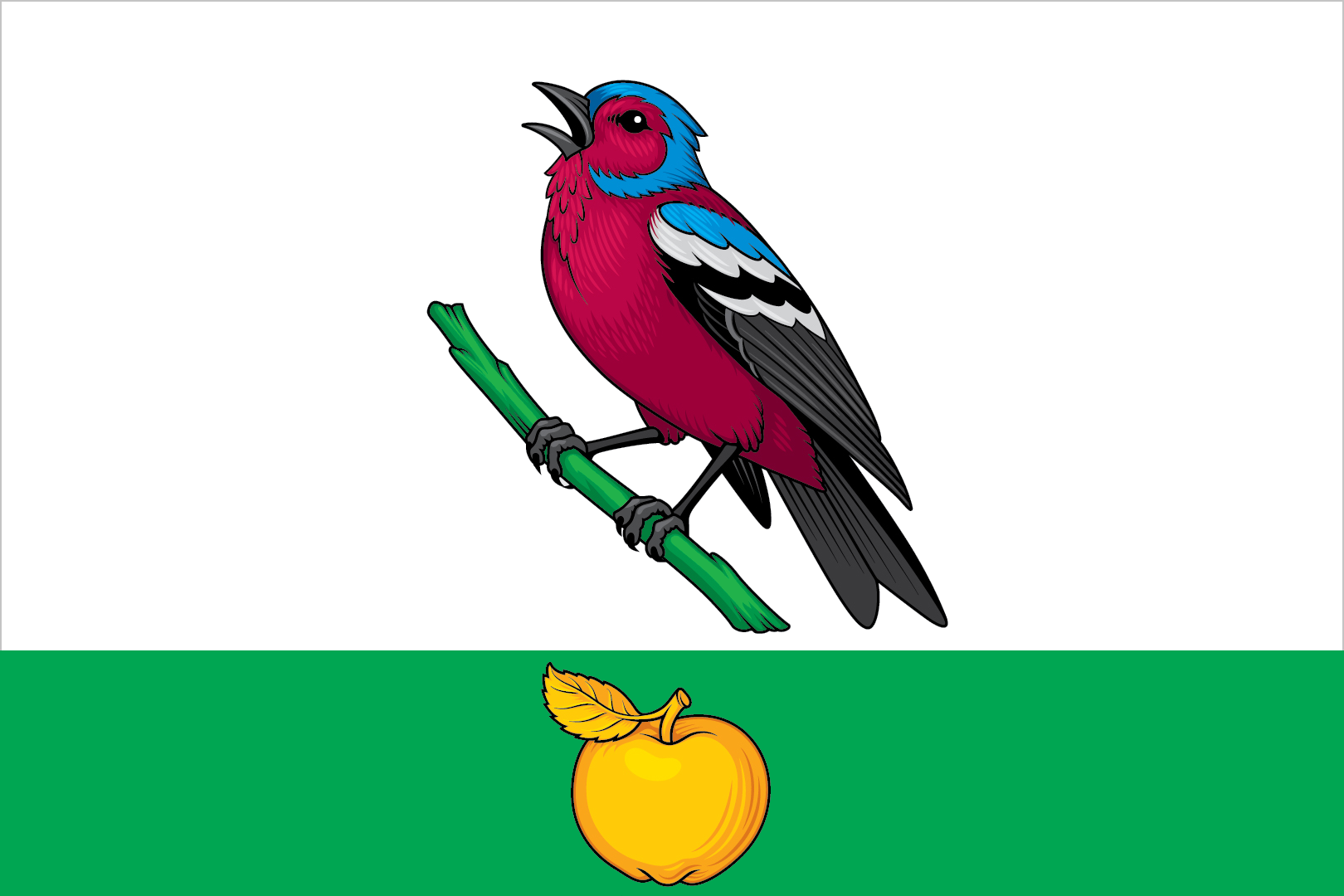
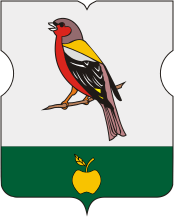
- Flag Coat of arms
- Location of Zyablikovo District on the map of Moscow
- Coordinates: 56°N 38°E
- Country: Russia
- Federal subject: Moscow

Area
  - Total: 4.379 km^{2} (1.691 sq mi)

Population
  - Estimate (2017): 131,297
- Time zone: UTC+
- OKTMO ID: 45916000
- Website: https://zyablikovo.mos.ru/

Zyablikovo District (Russian: район Зябликово) is an administrative district (raion) of Southern Administrative Okrug, and one of the 125 raions of Moscow, Russia. The area of the district is 4,379 square kilometers (1,691 sq mi). As of 2017, it had a population of 131,297.

== See also ==
- Administrative divisions of Moscow
