= Southern Administrative Okrug =

Southern Administrative Okrug Южный административный округ
- Administrative okrug of Moscow
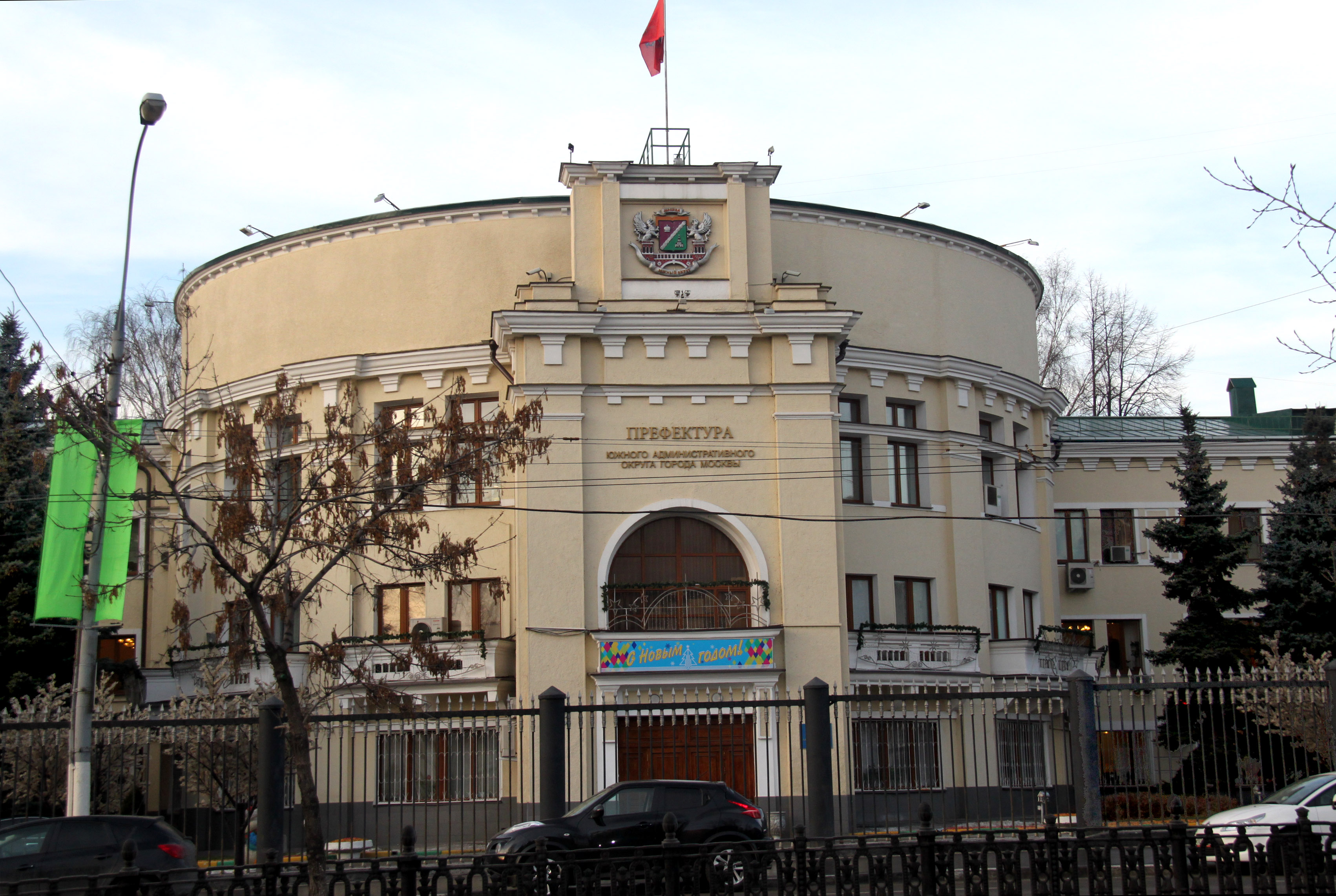
- Prefecture building of Southern Administrative Okrug

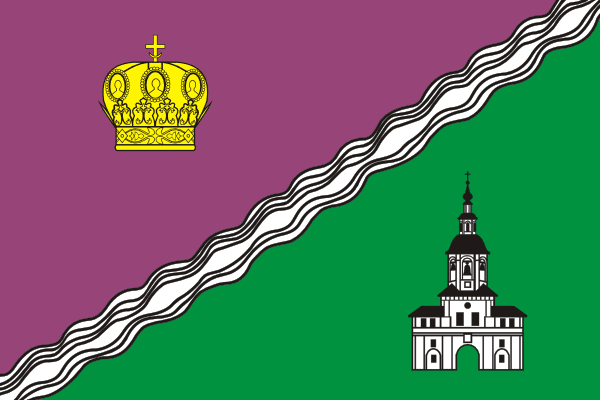
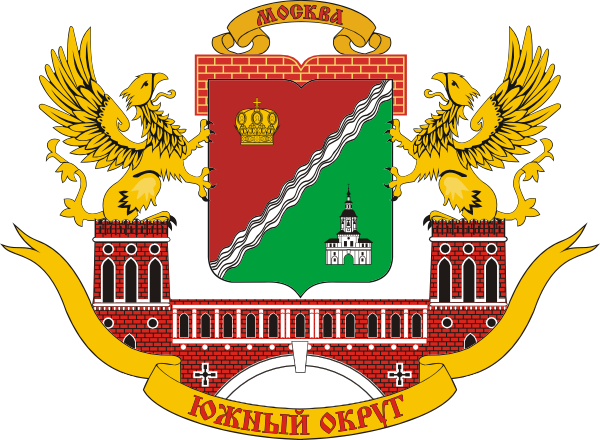
- Flag Coat of arms
- Southern Administrative Okrug in Moscow
- Coordinates: 55°38′N 37°40′E
- Country: Russia
- Federal city: Moscow
- Established: 1991
- Districts: 16

Government
  - Prefect: Alexey Chelyshev

Area
  - Total: 132 km^{2} (51 sq mi)

Population (2010 Census)
  - Total: 1,716,808
- Website: http://uao.mos.ru

Southern Administrative Okrug, or Yuzhny Administrative Okrug (Russian: Южный административный округ, romanized: Yuzhny administrativny okrug), is one of the twelve high-level territorial divisions (administrative okrugs) of the federal city of Moscow, Russia. As of the 2010 Census, its population was 1,716,808, up from 1,593,065 recorded during the 2002 Census.

Historical population
| Year | Pop. | ±% |
|---|---|---|
| 2002 | 1,593,065 | — |
| 2010 | 1,716,808 | +7.8% |
| 2021 | 1,789,371 | +4.2% |
Source: Census data

== History ==
The territory that comprises the modern Southern Administrative Okrug attracted settlers from time immemorial, even in spite of the fact that it had historically been an unsafe area. In order to protect the borders, powerful monasteries were built. The first one was the Danilov Monastery, founded in 1271 by Prince Daniel of Moscow.

In 1593, the Donskoy Monastery was established to commemorate the victory over Khan Kazi-Girey. Villages appeared and grew near the monastery. Kolomna was one of the first villages to appear in the area. Urban development of the area began in the 16th–17th centuries, at which time the Kolomenskoye architectural ensemble was also built. The Ascension Church in particular is listed by the UNESCO as a World Heritage Site.

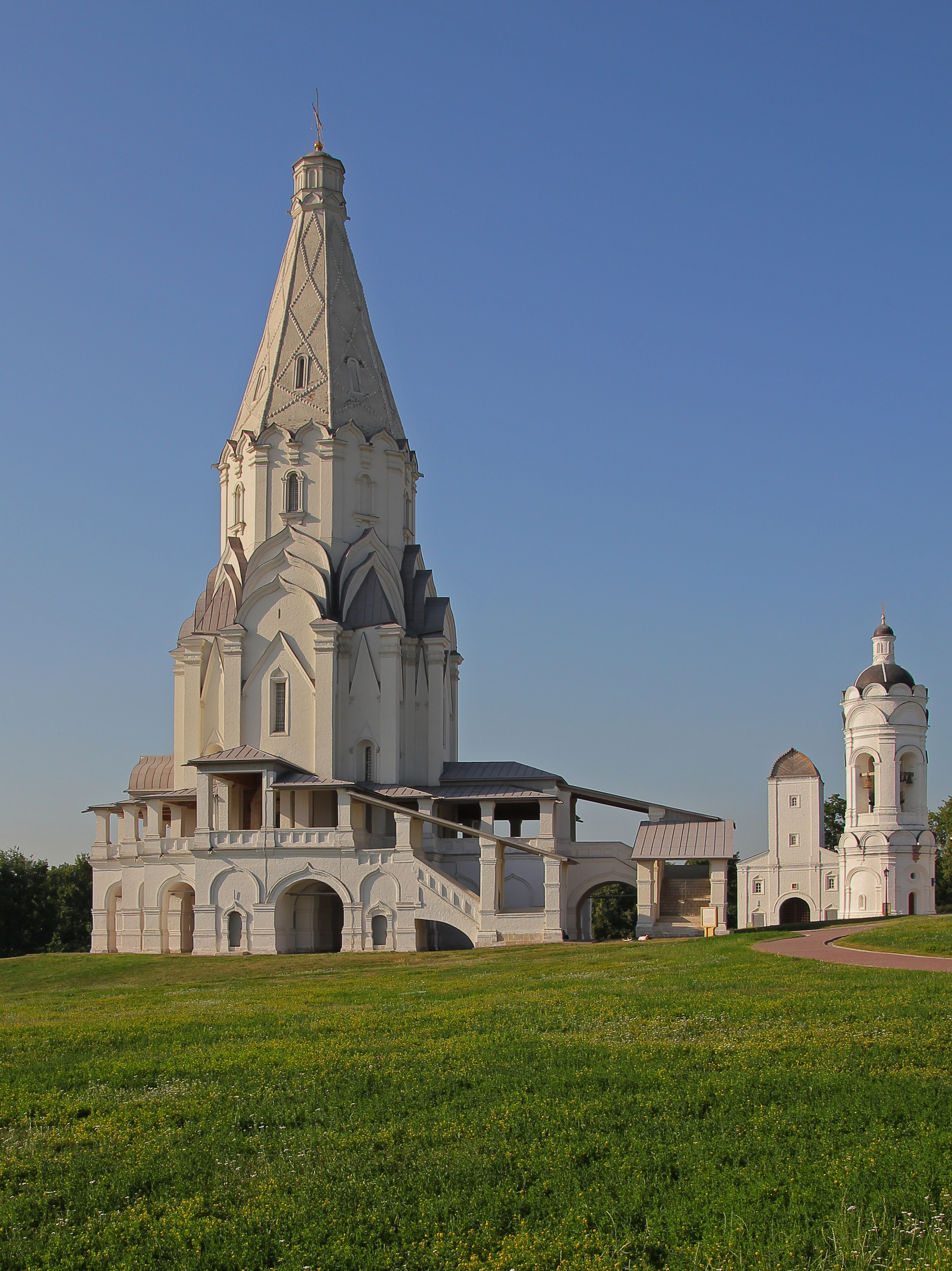
The Ascension Church in the Kolomenskoye Museum Reserve

== Territorial divisions ==
The administrative okrug comprises the following sixteen districts:

- Biryulyovo Vostochnoye
- Biryulyovo Zapadnoye
- Brateyevo
- Chertanovo Severnoye
- Chertanovo Tsentralnoye
- Chertanovo Yuzhnoye
- Danilovsky
- Donskoy
- Moskvorechye-Saburovo
- Nagatino-Sadovniki
- Nagatinsky zaton
- Nagorny
- Orekhovo-Borisovo Severnoye
- Orekhovo-Borisovo Yuzhnoye
- Tsaritsyno
- Zyablikovo
