= List of churches in Moscow =

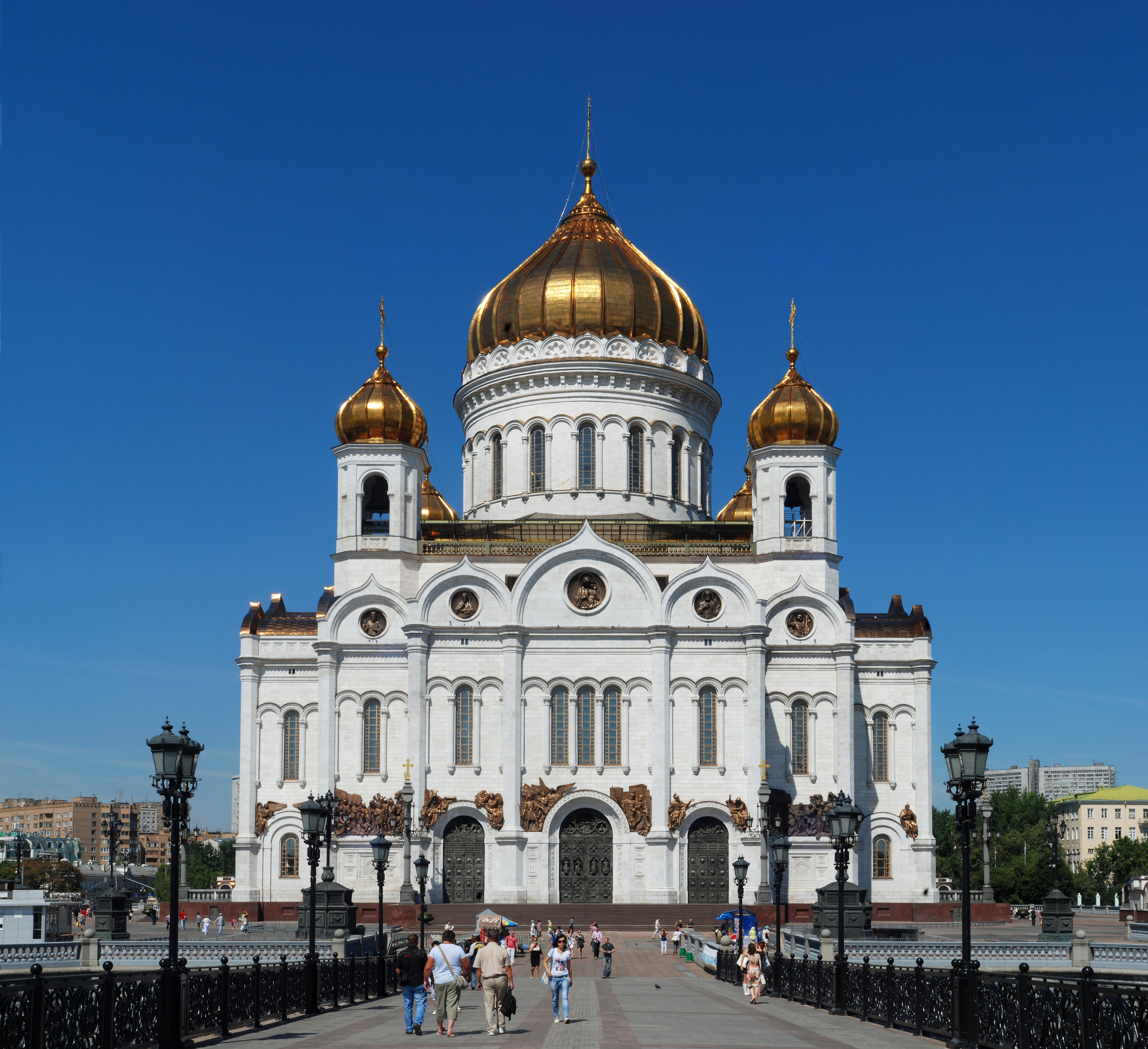
The Cathedral of Christ the Saviour is the tallest Orthodox church.

In 2019 there were more than 1,200 churches from different Christian denominations in Moscow. The majority of the population belongs to the Russian Orthodox Church, which consequently has by far the largest number of churches; (1154 in 2017) compared to over 1600 before the 1917 revolution; much smaller numbers belong to various Eastern and Western denominations. Non-orthodox churches include the Seventh-day Adventist church, the Roman Catholic Cathedral of the Immaculate Conception of the Holy Virgin Mary and the Anglican St. Andrew's Church. There have been indications of other Christian denominations in Moscow since the 14th century, when the first non-orthodox parishes were created (such as Protestant Churches).

Until 1917, more than 1,600 churches existed in Moscow; however, this changed after the 1917 Revolution in Russia, when the Bolsheviks came to power. One of their ideologies was state atheism, and subsequently many churches were destroyed or reconstructed for other purposes. By the time the Soviet Union's last president, Mikhail Gorbachev, introduced his glasnost (openness) policy to eliminate persecution against religious groups and instead adopt freedom of religion. there were only about 150 open churches left in Moscow. Since then, religion in Russia and Moscow has experienced a revival, and many churches have or are being reconstructed or restored and then reconsecrated. Today, there are more than 900 religious organizations and more than 40 denominations in Moscow. The dominant denomination in both believers and churches is the Russian Orthodox Church, with 320 parishes.

On 29 July 2011, the Moscow Patriarchate and the acting mayor of Moscow, Vladimir Resin, agreed upon the project "Program 200". Their aim is to reconstruct 200 churches that were destroyed during the Soviet Era. The first church from that project, the Church-Chapel of the Blessed Saint Dmitry Donskoy, was consecrated on 13 June 2012 in the Northwestern Okrug. By December 21, 2017 statistics, Russian Orthodox Church had 1154 churches and chapels in Moscow, including: 6 Kremlin cathedrals, 2 cathedral churches, 295 parish churches, 31 baptismal churches, 114 temporary churches, 54 monastery churches. By 2018, there were 507 Russian Orthodox churches with no less than once a week sacred worship.

The list below is geographically subdivided into ten administrative okrugs: Centre, North, Northeast, East, Southeast, South, Southwest, West, Northwest and Zelenograd. Within each of these ten tables, the boldfaced entries are alphabetically sorted by the patron saint or the church's consecrated feast day. The column "Year of completion" lists date of the church's completion or the consecration of the respective active building, without consideration of any subsequent renovations, expansions or additional construction (e.g., former wooden churches on the same location). If the build year is unknown, an approximate date is listed. The column "District" indicates the Moscow district where the church is located. The precise geographic coordinate is included under the district; these coordinates link to a map of the city and the location of the selected church.

The list is restricted to isolated consecrated churches and cathedrals. Desecrated, former churches are not listed here, nor are churches which do not occupy their own building or a part of it (e.g., house churches within secular buildings). Chapels and other sacred buildings without regular church services are not listed (including pure baptisteries and memorial chapels).

== List of churches by districts ==
=== Centre ===
List of churches in the Central Okrug
Picture	Name	Year of completion	Denomination	District
	Church of the Man of God **Alexius** in Krasnoye Selo Храм Алексия человека Божия в Красном селе	1858	Russian Orthodox	Krasnoselsky; 55°46′58″N 37°39′54″E
	Church of the Metropolitan **Alexius of Moscow** in Rogozhskaya Sloboda Храм святителя Алексия, митрополита Московского, что в Рогожской слободе	1751	Russian Orthodox	Tagansky; 55°44′47.43″N 37°39′55.86″E
	Church of **All Saints** in Krasnoye Selo Храм Всех Святых в Красном селе	1891	Russian Orthodox	Krasnoselsky; 55°47′04″N 37°40′04″E
	Church of **All Saints** on the Swamp Храм Всех Святых на Кулишках	1689	Russian Orthodox	Tagansky; 55°45′12″N 37°38′06″E
	Church of Saint **Ambrose of Milan** at the Novodevichy Convent Храм святителя Амвросия Медиоланского в Новодевичьем монастыре	1550 or earlier	Russian Orthodox	Khamovniki; 55°43′34.2″N 37°33′20.3″E
	Church of Saint **Andrew** at the Vagankovo Cemetery Храм апостола Андрея Первозванного на Ваганьковском кладбище	1824	Russian Orthodox	Presnensky; 55°46′5.4″N 37°33′16.6″E
	St. **Andrew**'s Anglican Church Англиканская церковь Святого Андрея	1884	Anglican	Presnensky; 55°45′30″N 37°36′17″E
	Church of the Bishop **Antipas of Pergamum** Храм священномученика Антипы, епископа Пергамского	1596	Russian Orthodox	Khamovniki; 55°44′52.8″N 37°36′19.4″E
	Church of the Patriarchs **Athanasius and Cyril** at the Sivka Gorge Храм святителей Афанасия и Кирилла, патриархов Александрийских, на Сивцевом Вражке	1856	Russian Orthodox	Arbat; 55°44′52.5″N 37°35′51.6″E
	Church of the **Outpouring of the Holy Spirit** at the former Lazarev Cemetery Храм Сошествия Святого Духа на бывшем Лазаревском кладбище	1787	Russian Orthodox	Meshchansky; 55°47′29″N 37°37′6.6″E
	Church of the **Outpouring of the Holy Spirit** at the Monastery of the Immaculate Conception of the Theotokos Храм Сошествия Святого Духа в Зачатьевском монастыре	1850	Russian Orthodox	Khamovniki; 55°44′22.8″N 37°35′57.1″E
	Church of the Martyr **Barbara** on the Varvarka Храм великомученицы Варвары на Варварке	1804	Russian Orthodox	Tverskoy; 55°45′08″N 37°37′34″E
	Church of the Venerable **Barlaam and Josaphat** at the belltower of the New Maidens' Monastery Храм преподобных Варлаама и Иоасафа в колокольне Новодевичьего монастыря	1690	Russian Orthodox	Khamovniki; 55°43′32.7″N 37°33′27.7″E
	Church of the Venerable Confessor **Basil** Храм преподобного исповедника Василия	1897	Russian Orthodox	Tagansky; 55°44′42.8″N 37°40′59.9″E
	Cathedral of Saint **Basil** (Note: Also called "Cathedral of the Protection of Most Holy Theotokos on the Moat" (Собор Покрова Пресвятой Богородицы на Рву)) Собор Василия Блаженного	1561	Russian Orthodox	Tverskoy; 55°45′09″N 37°37′23″E
	Church of the Martyr Saint **Blaise** Храм священномученика Власия	1644	Russian Orthodox	Khamovniki; 55°44′42.9″N 37°35′30.6″E
	Church of the Martyr **Catherine** on the Field Храм великомученицы Екатерины на Всполье	1775	Russian Orthodox	Yakimanka; 55°43′59″N 37°37′26″E
	Church of the Resurrection of Christ in Kadashi Храм Воскресения Христова в Кадашах	1695	Russian Orthodox	Yakimanka; 55°44′36″N 37°37′20″E
	Church of the **Resurrection of Christ and the Protection of the Theotokos** Храм Воскресения Христова и Покрова Богородицы	1908	Old Believers (priestless)	Basmanny; 55°46′00″N 37°40′15″E
	Cathedral of **Christ the Saviour** Кафедральный Соборный Храм Христа Спасителя	2000	Russian Orthodox	Khamovniki; 55°44′41″N 37°36′20″E
	Church of the **Ascension of Christ** on the Pea Field Храм Вознесения Господня на Гороховом поле	1793	Russian Orthodox	Basmanny; 55°45′50.3″N 37°40′17.9″E
	Church of the **Ascension of Christ** on the Nikitskaya Храм Вознесения Господня на Никитской	1680	Russian Orthodox	Presnensky; 55°45′25″N 37°36′13″E
	Church of the **Ascension of Christ** behind the Serpukhov Gate Храм Вознесения Господня за Серпуховскими воротами	1762	Russian Orthodox	Zamoskvorechye; 55°43′33.9″N 37°37′25.3″E
	Church of the **Ascension of Christ** in Storozhy Храм Вознесения Господня в Сторожах	1816	Russian Orthodox	Presnensky; 55°45′27″N 37°35′44″E
	Church of the Martyr Saint **Clement of Rome** Храм священномученика Климента, Папы Римского	1662	Russian Orthodox	Zamoskvorechye; 55°44′26.4″N 37°37′38.7″E
	Church of the **Conception of Saint Anne** at the Corner Храм Зачатия праведной Анны, что в Углу	1493	Russian Orthodox	Tverskoy; 55°45′0.5″N 37°37′51.6″E
	Church of Saints **Cosmas and Damian** on the Maroseyka Храм Космы и Дамиана на Маросейке	1793	Russian Orthodox	Basmanny; 55°45′28.4″N 37°38′18.7″E
	Church of Saints **Cosmas and Damian** in Shubino Храм Космы и Дамиана в Шубине	1657	Russian Orthodox	Tverskoy; 55°45′41.8″N 37°36′41.4″E
	Church of Saints **Cosmas and Damian** in Staryye Pany Храм Космы и Дамиана в Старых Панех	1560?	Russian Orthodox	Tverskoy; 55°45′22″N 37°37′34.3″E
	Cathedral of the Feast Day of the Decapitation of **John the Baptist** at the John the Baptist Monastery Собор Усекновения главы Иоанна Предтечи в Иоанно-Предтеченском монастыре	1879	Russian Orthodox	Basmanny; 55°45′16″N 37°38′24″E
	Church of the Feast Day of the Decapitation of **John the Baptist** ahead the Forest Храм Усекновения главы Иоанна Предтечи под Бором	1675	Russian Orthodox	Zamoskvorechye; 55°44′41″N 37°37′34.9″E
	Church of the Orthodox Tsarevich **Dmitry** at the First Municipal Hospital Храм благоверного царевича Димитрия при 1-й Градской больнице	1801	Russian Orthodox	Yakimanka; 55°43′23.94″N 37°36′1.99″E
	Church of the Venerable **Dimitry Prilutsky** on the Virgin Field Храм преподобного Димитрия Прилуцкого на Девичьем поле	1903	Russian Orthodox	Khamovniki; 55°43′44.5″N 37°33′48.4″E
	Church of the Prophet **Elijah** at the Novgorod Metochi Храм пророка Илии на Новгородском подворье	1520	Russian Orthodox	Tverskoy; 55°45′16.4″N 37°37′26.2″E
	Church of the Prophet **Elijah** in the Obydensky Alley Храм пророка Илии в Обыденском переулке	1706	Russian Orthodox	Khamovniki; 55°44′32.3″N 37°36′14.4″E
	Church of the **Entry of the Theotokos into the Temple of Jerusalem** in Barashy Храм Введения во храм Пресвятой Богородицы в Барашах	1701	Russian Orthodox	Basmanny; 55°45′33″N 37°38′59″E
	Cathedral of the **Epiphany** in Yelokhovo Собор Богоявления Господня в Елохове	1845	Russian Orthodox	Basmanny; 55°46′22″N 37°40′30″E
	Church of the **Epiphany** at the former Epiphany Monastery Храм Богоявления Господня в бывшем Богоявленском монастыре	1696	Russian Orthodox	Tverskoy; 55°45′21.2″N 37°37′24.5″E
	Church of the **Feast of the Cross** at the Clean Gorge Храм Воздвижения Креста Господня на Чистом Вражке	1708	Russian Orthodox	Khamovniki; 55°44′19.3″N 37°34′28.1″E
	Church of the **Forty Martyrs of Sebaste** Храм Сорока мучеников Севастийских	1645	Russian Orthodox	Tagansky; 55°43′54.4″N 37°39′32″E
	Church of the Martyrs **Frol and Lavr** in Zatsep Храм мучеников Флора и Лавра на Зацепе	1778	Russian Orthodox	Zamoskvorechye; 55°43′42.3″N 37°38′16.5″E
	Church of the Archangel **Gabriel** (Note: Also "Menshikov Tower" (Меншикова башня)) Храм архангела Гавриила	1707	Russian Orthodox	Basmanny; 55°45′47″N 37°38′20″E
	Church of the Martyr Saint **George the Victorious** in Grusiny Храм великомученика Георгия Победоносца в Грузинах	1750	Georgian Orthodox	Presnensky; 55°45′57″N 37°34′36.8″E
	Church of the Martyr **George the Victorious** in Yendovo Храм великомученика Георгия Победоносца в Ендове	1653	Russian Orthodox	Zamoskvorechye; 55°44′50.7″N 37°37′37.4″E
	Church of the Martyr **George the Victorious** on the Pskov Mountain Храм великомученика Георгия Победоносца на Псковской горе	1658	Russian Orthodox	Tverskoy; 55°45′09″N 37°37′51″E
	Church of the Martyr **George the Victorious** in Staryye Luchniki Храм великомученика Георгия Победоносца в Старых Лучниках	1694	Russian Orthodox	Tverskoy; 55°45′29.5″N 37°37′48.9″E
	Church of Saint **Gregory of Neocaesarea** Храм святителя Григория, епископа Неокесарийского	1679	Russian Orthodox	Zamoskvorechye; 55°44′15″N 37°37′9″E
	Cathedral of the **Immaculate Conception of the Holy Virgin Mary** Собор Непорочного Зачатия Пресвятой Девы Марии	1911	Roman Catholic	Presnenski; 55°46′2″N 37°34′17″E
	Church of the Martyr **Irene** in Pokrovskoye Храм мученицы Ирины в Покровском	1792	Russian Orthodox	Basmanny; 55°46′30.7″N 37°41′17″E
	Church of the Apostle **James** Храм апостола Иакова Заведеева	1676	Russian Orthodox	Basmanny; 55°45′29.8″N 37°39′15.2″E
	Church of the Apostle **John** on the Bronnaya Храм апостола Иоанна Богослова на Бронной	1665	Russian Orthodox	Presnensky; 55°45′43.9″N 37°36′3.1″E
	Church of the Martyr **John the Warrior** Храм мученика Иоанна Воина	1717	Russian Orthodox	Yakimanka; 55°43′57″N 37°36′40″E
	Church of Saint **John Chrysostom** at the Nativity of the Theotokos Monastery Храм святителя Иоанна Златоуста в Богородице-Рождественском монастыре	1687	Russian Orthodox	Meshchansky; 55°45′55.95″N 37°37′28.04″E
	Church of the Nativity of **John the Baptist** on the Presnya Храм Рождества Иоанна Предтечи на Пресне	1734	Russian Orthodox	Presnenski; 55°45′31.9″N 37°34′19″E
	Church of Saint **Louis of France** Храм Святого Людовика Французского	1835	Roman Catholic	Krasnoselsky; 55°45′45.62″N 37°37′52.45″E
	Church of the Venerable Hermit **Maron** Храм преподобного пустынника Марона	1730	Russian Orthodox	Yakimanka; 55°44′6.6″N 37°36′41.5″E
	Church of the Pope Saint **Martin** of Rome Храм святителя Мартина, папы Римского	1806	Russian Orthodox	Tagansky; 55°44′37″N 37°39′38″E
	Church of the Venerable Blessed **Maximus the Confessor** Храм преподобного Максима блаженного	1699	Russian Orthodox	Tverskoy; 55°45′9.13″N 37°37′38.22″E
	Church of the **Merciful Saviour** at the former Monastery of the Theotokos icon "Joy of all who Sorrow" Храм Спаса Всемилостивого в бывшем Скорбященском монастыре	1894	Russian Orthodox	Tverskoy; 55°47′24.5″N 37°35′38.45″E
	Cathedral of the Archangel **Michael** in the Kremlin Собор Архангела Михаила в Кремле	1508	Russian Orthodox	(unassigned); 55°45′1″N 37°37′4″E
	Church of the Archangel **Michael** at the former Andronikov Monastery Храм Архангела Михаила в бывшем Спасо-Андрониковом монастыре	1739	Russian Orthodox	Tagansky; 55°44′56.7″N 37°40′12.9″E
	Church of the Archangel **Michael** on the Maidens' Field Храм Архангела Михаила на Девичьем поле	1897	Russian Orthodox	Khamovniki; 55°44′6″N 37°34′25.1″E
	Church of the Archangel **Michael** in Ovchinniki Храм Архангела Михаила в Овчинниках	17th century	Russian Orthodox	Zamoskvorechye; 55°44′40.9″N 37°37′58.1″E
	Church of the Orthodox Ruler **Michael** and of the Boyar **Theodor** of Chernigov Храм Черниговских чудотворцев благоверного князя Михаила и боярина Феодора	1572	Russian Orthodox	Zamoskvorechye; 55°44′40.2″N 37°37′34.6″E
	Church of the **Nine Martyrs of Cyzicus** Храм Девяти мучеников Кизических	1735	Russian Orthodox	Arbat; 55°45′16.5″N 37°34′47.3″E
	Church of the **Holy Image of the Saviour Not Made by Hands** at the former Andronikov Monastery Храм Спаса Нерукотворного Образа в бывшем Спасо-Андрониковом монастыре	1427	Russian Orthodox	Tagansky; 55°44′57.3″N 37°40′15.2″E
	Church of the **Holy Image of the Saviour Not Made by Hands** at the Monastery of the Immaculate Conception Храм Спаса Нерукотворного Образа в Зачатьевском монастыре	1696	Russian Orthodox	Khamovniki; 55°44′25″N 37°35′58.7″E
	Church of the **Holy Image of the Saviour Not Made by Hands** on the Nikolskaya Храм Спаса Нерукотворного Образа на Никольской	1660?	Russian Orthodox	Tverskoy; 55°45′23.5″N 37°37′15.5″E
	Church of the Martyr Saint **Nikita** on the Louse Mountain Храм священномученика Никиты на Швивой горке	1595	Russian Orthodox	Taganski; 55°44′45″N 37°38′41″E
	Church of the Martyr **Nikita** on the Basmannaya Храм великомученика Никиты на Старой Басманной	1751	Russian Orthodox	Basmanny; 55°45′56″N 37°39′43″E
	Church of Saint **Nicholas** on the Bersenevka Храм Николая Чудотворца на Берсеневке	1657	Russian Orthodox	Yakimanka; 55°44′37″N 37°36′38″E
	Church of Saint **Nicholas** on the Bolvanovka Храм Николая Чудотворца на Болвановке	1682	Russian Orthodox	Tagansky; 55°44′34″N 37°39′09″E
	Church of Saint **Nicholas** at the Research Institute for Neurosurgery "N.N.Burdenko" Храм Николая Чудотворца при НИИ нейрохирургии имени Бурденко	1902	Russian Orthodox	Tverskoy; 55°46′27.25″N 37°35′51.97″E
	Church of Saint **Nicholas** in Khamovniki Храм Николая Чудотворца в Хамовниках	1682	Russian Orthodox	Khamovniki; 55°43′55.2″N 37°35′29.4″E
	Church of Saint **Nicholas** in Derbenevo Храм Николая Чудотворца в Дербеневе	1715	Russian Orthodox	Krasnoselsky; 55°46′6.4″N 37°38′16.3″E
	Church of Saint **Nicholas** on the Three Mountains Храм Николая Чудотворца на Трёх Горах	1775	Russian Orthodox	Presnensky; 55°45′31″N 37°33′59″E
	Church of Saint **Nicholas** in Golutvino Храм Николая Чудотворца в Голутвине	1687	Russian Orthodox	Yakimanka; 55°44′17″N 37°36′41.4″E
	Church of Saint **Nicholas** on the Wooden Staffs Храм Николая Чудотворца на Щепах	1686	Russian Orthodox	Arbat; 55°44′57.1″N 37°34′49.6″E
	Church of Saint **Nicholas** in Klyonniki Храм Николая Чудотворца в Клённиках	1657	Russian Orthodox	Basmanny; 55°45′27″N 37°37′56″E
	Church of Saint **Nicholas** in Kotelniki Храм Николая Чудотворца в Котельниках	1824	Russian Orthodox	Tagansky; 55°44′40″N 37°38′42″E
	Church of Saint **Nicholas** in Kusnetsy Храм Николая Чудотворца в Кузнецах	1805	Russian Orthodox	Zamoskvorechye; 55°44′12″N 37°37′58.1″E
	Church of Saint **Nicholas** at the Novospassky Monastery Храм Николая Чудотворца в Новоспасском монастыре	1652	Russian Orthodox	Taganski; 55°43′57″N 37°39′25.1″E
	Church of Saint **Nicholas** in Podkopai Храм Николая Чудотворца в Подкопаях	1858	Russian Orthodox	Basmanny; 55°45′11″N 37°38′30″E
	Church of Saint **Nicholas** in Pokrovskoye Храм Николая Чудотворца в Покровском	1766	Russian Orthodox	Basmanny; 55°46′49″N 37°41′42″E
	Church of Saint **Nicholas** in Pyzhy Храм Николая Чудотворца в Пыжах	1657	Russian Orthodox	Zamoskvorechye; 55°44′20″N 37°37′30″E
	Church of Saint **Nicholas** in Sayaitskoye Храм Николая Чудотворца в Заяицком	1759	Russian Orthodox	Zamoskvorechye; 55°44′49″N 37°38′7.7″E
	Church of Saint **Nicholas** "Beautiful Ringing" Храм Николая Чудотворца «Красный звон»	1858	Russian Orthodox	Tverskoy; 55°45′13.3″N 37°37′45.7″E
	Church of Saint **Nicholas** in Staroye Vagankovo Храм Николая Чудотворца в Старом Ваганькове	1759	Russian Orthodox	Arbat; 55°45′0.8″N 37°36′27″E
	Church of Saint **Nicholas** in Studentsy Храм Николая Чудотворца в Студенцах	1673	Russian Orthodox (Yedinovertsy)	Tagansky; 55°44′24.9″N 37°39′37.7″E
	Church of Saint **Nicholas** in Zvonary Храм Николая Чудотворца в Звонарях	1781	Russian Orthodox	Meshchansky; 55°45′51″N 37°37′23″E
	Church of Saint **Nicholas** in Tolmachy Храм Николая Чудотворца в Толмачах	1697	Russian Orthodox	Yakimanka; 55°44′26.8″N 37°37′13.4″E
	Church of Saint **Nicholas** at the Twersky City Gate Храм Николы Чудотворца у Тверской заставы	1921	Old Believers (Old-Rite Church)	Tverskoy; 55°46′40″N 37°35′8″E
	Cathedral of the Metropolitan **Peter of Moscow** at the former High Monastery of Saint Peter Собор святителя Петра, митрополита Московского, в бывшем Высоко-Петровском монастыре	1517	Russian Orthodox	Tverskoy; 55°46′1.9″N 37°36′54.9″E
	Church of Saints **Peter and Paul** Лютеранский храм апостолов Петра и Павла	1905	Evangelical-Lutheran	Basmanny; 55°45′24″N 37°38′23″E
	Church of the Apostles **Peter and Paul** on the Basmannaya Храм апостолов Петра и Павла на Новой Басманной	1728	Russian Orthodox	Krasnoselsky; 55°46′11.5″N 37°39′23.3″E
	Church of the Apostles **Peter and Paul** at the Yauza Gate Храм апостолов Петра и Павла у Яузских ворот	1702	Russian Orthodox	Tagansky; 55°45′4″N 37°38′36″E
	Church of the Metropolitan **Philipp of Moscow** Храм святителя Филиппа, Митрополита Московского	1691	Russian Orthodox	Meshchansky; 55°46′51.2″N 37°37′51.6″E
	Church of the Venerable **Pimen the Great** in Novyye Vorotniki Храм преподобного Пимена Великого в Новых Воротниках	1702	Russian Orthodox	Tverskoy; 55°46′42.4″N 37°36′15.6″E
	Katholikon of the Sretensky Monastery Собор Сретения Владимирской иконы Божией Матери в Сретенском монастыре	1679	Russian Orthodox	Meshchansky; 55°45′56″N 37°37′49″E
	Church of the Renewal of the **Church of the Resurrection of Christ** in Jerusalem on the Arbat Храм Воскресения Словущего на Арбате	1688	Russian Orthodox	Arbat; 55°45′0.9″N 37°35′56.2″E
	Church of the Renewal of the **Church of the Resurrection of Christ** in Jerusalem at the Ascension Gorge Храм Воскресения Словущего на Успенском Вражке	1634	Russian Orthodox	Presnensky; 55°45′34″N 37°36′26″E
	Church of the Renewal of the **Church of the Resurrection of Christ** in Jerusalem in Krutitsy Храм Воскресения Словущего в Крутицах	1650s	Russian Orthodox	Tagansky; 55°43′40.4″N 37°39′28.8″E
	Church of the Renewal of the **Church of the Resurrection of Christ** in Jerusalem at the Protection of the Theotokos Monastery Храм Воскресения Словущего в Покровском монастыре	1856	Russian Orthodox	Tagansky; 55°44′17.4″N 37°40′12.8″E
	Church of the Renewal of the **Church of the Resurrection of Christ** in Jerusalem at the Vagankovo Cemetery Храм Воскресения Словущего на Ваганьковском кладбище	1824	Russian Orthodox	Presnensky; 55°46′06″N 37°33′13″E
	Church of the Holy **Resurrection** at the Armenian Cemetery Храм Святого Воскресения на Армянском кладбище	1815	Armenian Apostolic	Presnensky; 55°45′57.4″N 37°33′16.7″E
	Church of the Venerable **Seraphim of Sarov** at the Expo Center in Moscow City Храм преподобного Серафима Саровского при Экспоцентре на Пресне	2008	Russian Orthodox	Presnensky; 55°44′57.31″N 37°32′43.98″E
	Church of the Venerable **Sergius of Radonezh** at the former High Monastery of Saint Peter Храм преподобного Сергия Радонежского в бывшем Высоко-Петровском монастыре	1702	Russian Orthodox	Tverskoy; 55°46′3″N 37°36′55″E
	Church of the Venerable **Sergius of Radonezh** in Krapivniki Храм преподобного Сергия Радонежского в Крапивниках	1678	Russian Orthodox	Tverskoy; 55°46′1.2″N 37°37′3.3″E
	Church of the Venerable **Sergius of Radonezh** at the Bell Tower of the Novospassky Monastery Храм преподобного Сергия Радонежского в колокольне Новоспасского монастыря	1787	Russian Orthodox	Tagansky; 55°43′55.1″N 37°39′27.4″E
	Church of the Venerable **Sergius of Radonezh** in Rogoshskaya Sloboda Храм преподобного Сергия Радонежского в Рогожской слободе	1818	Russian Orthodox	Tagansky; 55°44′48″N 37°40′6″E
	Church of the Venerable **Sergius and German of Valaam** Храм преподобных Сергия и Германа Валаамских	1904	Russian Orthodox	Tverskoy; 55°46′29.5″N 37°35′20.8″E
	Church of the Venerable **Simeon Stylites** behind the Yauza Храм преподобного Симеона Столпника за Яузой	1657	Russian Orthodox	Tagansky; 55°44′50″N 37°39′0″E
	Church of the Venerable **Simeon Stylites** on the Povarskaya Храм преподобного Симеона Столпника на Поварской	1679	Russian Orthodox	Arbat; 55°45′11.9″N 37°35′50.3″E
	Church of **Sophia, Wisdom of God**, at the Cannon Yard Храм Софии – Премудрости Божией у Пушечного двора	1650	Russian Orthodox	Meshchansky; 55°45′38.7″N 37°37′32.3″E
	Church of **Sophia, Wisdom of God**, in Srednyye Sadovniki Храм Софии – Премудрости Божией в Средних Садовниках	1682	Russian Orthodox	Yakimanka; 55°44′53.44″N 37°37′17.22″E
	Church of the Martyr **Tatiana** at the Moscow State University Храм мученицы Татианы при Московском университете	1791	Russian Orthodox	Arbat; 55°45′16.4″N 37°36′42.1″E
	Church of the Martyr **Theodore of Stratelates** Храм великомученика Феодора Стратилата	1806	Russian Orthodox	Basmanny; 55°45′46.63″N 37°38′20.88″E
	Church of the Venerable **Theodore Studites** Храм преподобного Феодора Студита	1627	Russian Orthodox	Arbat; 55°45′25.1″N 37°35′51.7″E
	Cathedral of the Annunciation in the Kremlin Собор Благовещения Пресвятой Богородицы в Кремле	1489	Russian Orthodox	(nicht ingewiesen); 55°45′0″N 37°37′1″E
	Church of the **Theotokos icon of Bogolyubovo** at the former High Monastery of Saint Peter Храм Боголюбской иконы Божией Матери в бывшем Высоко-Петровском монастыре	1684	Russian Orthodox	Tverskoy; 55°46′0.8″N 37°36′57.6″E
	Cathedral of the **Dormition of the Theotokos** in the Kremlin Собор Успения Пресвятой Богородицы в Кремле	1479	Russian Orthodox	(unassigned); 55°45′4″N 37°37′1″E
	Church of the **Dormition of the Theotokos** in Gonchary Храм Успения Пресвятой Богородицы в Гончарах	1654	Russian Orthodox	Tagansky; 55°44′31.8″N 37°39′2″E
	Church of the **Dormition of the Theotokos** on the Tombs Храм Успения Пресвятой Богородицы на Могильцах	1806	Russian Orthodox	Khamovniki; 55°44′37.6″N 37°35′26.1″E
	Church of the **Dormition of the Theotokos** at the Ascension Gorge Храм Успения Пресвятой Богородицы на Успенском Вражке	1860	Russian Orthodox	Tverskoy; 55°45′30.8″N 37°36′35.4″E
	Church of the **Dormition of the Theotokos** in the Cossacks Quarter Храм Успения Пресвятой Богородицы в Казачьей слободе	1697	Russian Orthodox	Yakimanka; 55°44′7″N 37°37′12.5″E
	Church of the **Dormition of the Theotokos** in Krutitsy Храм Успения Пресвятой Богородицы в Крутицах	1690	Russian Orthodox	Tagansky; 55°43′42.25″N 37°39′32.33″E
	Church of the **Dormition of the Theotokos** at the Refectory of the New Maidens' Monastery Храм Успения Пресвятой Богородицы в трапезной Новодевичьего монастыря	1687	Russian Orthodox	Khamovniki; 55°43′34.2″N 37°33′20.4″E
	Church of the **Dormition of the Theotokos** in Pechatniki Храм Успения Пресвятой Богородицы в Печатниках	1695	Russian Orthodox	Meshchansky; 55°46′1.2″N 37°37′51.8″E
	Church of the **Dormition of the Theotokos** in Putinki Храм Успения Пресвятой Богородицы в Путинках	1676	Russian Orthodox	Tverskoy; 55°46′8.1″N 37°36′27″E
	Church of the **Dormition of the Theotokos** at the Chishevskoye Metochi Храм Успения Пресвятой Богородицы на Чижевском подворье	1691	Russian Orthodox	Tverskoy; 55°45′26.1″N 37°37′25.4″E
	Church of the **Theotokos icon of Iviron** at the Field Храм Иверской иконы Божией Матери на Всполье	1802	Russian Orthodox	Zamoskvorechye; 55°44′10″N 37°37′29″E
	Church of the **Theotokos icon of Iviron** in the former Iviron Parish of the Gracious Sister of Mercy Храм Иверской иконы Божией Матери при бывшей Иверской общины сестёр милосердия	1901	Russian Orthodox	Yakimanka; 55°44′18.5″N 37°37′2.4″E
	Church of the **Theotokos icon of Jerusalem** Храм Иерусалимской иконы Божией Матери	1915	Russian Orthodox	Taganski; 55°44′0.9″N 37°40′40.7″E
	Church of the **Theotokos icon "Joy of all who Sorrow"** at the MONIKI-Research Institute Hospital Храм иконы Божией Матери «Всех скорбящих Радость» при больнице МОНИКИ	1899	Russian Orthodox	Meshchansky; 55°47′5.7″N 37°37′44.2″E
	Church of the **Theotokos icon "Joy of all who Sorrow"** on the Ordynka Храм иконы Божией Матери «Всех скорбящих Радость» на Большой Ордынке	1685	Russian Orthodox	Yakimanka; 55°44′29″N 37°37′27″E
	Cathedral of the **Theotokos icon of Kazan** Собор Казанской иконы Божией Матери	1993	Russian Orthodox	Tverskoy; 55°45′20″N 37°37′9″E
	Church of the **Theotokos icon of Kazan** at the Nativity of the Theotokos Monastery Храм Казанской иконы Божией Матери в Богородице-Рождественском монастыре	1906	Russian Orthodox	Meshchansky; 55°45′58.5″N 37°37′29.6″E
	Church of the **Nativity of the Theotokos** at the Nativity of the Theotokos Monastery Храм Рождества Пресвятой Богородицы в Богородице-Рождественском монастыре	1505	Russian Orthodox	Meshchansky; 55°45′57.2″N 37°37′28.4″E
	Church of the **Nativity of the Theotokos** in Putinki Храм Рождества Пресвятой Богородицы в Путинках	1652	Russian Orthodox	Tverskoy; 55°46′1″N 37°36′24.3″E
	Church of the **Nativity of the Theotokos** on the Swamp Храм Рождества Пресвятой Богородицы на Кулишках	1804	Russian Orthodox	Taganski; 55°45′10″N 37°38′24″E
	Church of the **Deposition of the Robe** in the Kremlin Храм Ризоположения в Кремле	1486	Russian Orthodox	(unassigned); 55°45′3″N 37°37′0″E
	Cathedral of the **Protection of the Theotokos** Покровский собор	1910	Old Believers (Old-Orthodox)	Zamoskvorechye; 55°43′57″N 37°38′3″E
	Cathedral of the **Protection of the Theotokos** at the former High Monastery of Saint Peter Храм Покрова Пресвятой Богородицы в бывшем Высоко-Петровском монастыре	1696	Russian Orthodox	Tverskoy; 55°46′2.3″N 37°36′52.5″E
	Church of the **Protection of the Theotokos** in Krasnoye Selo Храм Покрова Пресвятой Богородицы в Красном селе	1701	Russian Orthodox	Krasnoselsky; 55°46′38″N 37°40′8″E
	Church of the **Protection of the Theotokos** on the Lyshchikov Mountain Храм Покрова Пресвятой Богородицы на Лыщиковой горе	1696	Russian Orthodox	Taganski; 55°44′54″N 37°39′15″E
	Church of the **Protection of the Theotokos** in the Ascension of the Theotokos Parish Храм Покрова Пресвятой Богородицы Покрово-Успенской общины	1911	Old Believers (Old-Rite)	Basmanny; 55°46′24.5″N 37°41′10.1″E
	Church of the **Protection of the Theotokos** at the Protection of the Theotokos Monastery Храм Покрова Пресвятой Богородицы в Покровском монастыре	1814	Russian Orthodox	Taganski; 55°44′17.5″N 37°40′14.7″E
	Church of the **Protection of the Theotokos** in the Mary and the Theokos Parish of the Sister of Mercy Храм Покрова Пресвятой Богородицы в Марфо-Марьинской обители сестёр милосердия	1912	Russian Orthodox	Yakimanka; 55°44′15.5″N 37°37′24.5″E
	Church of the **Protection of the Theotokos** at the Novospassky Monastery Храм Покрова Пресвятой Богородицы в Новоспасском монастыре	1675	Russian Orthodox	Tagansky; 55°43′53.89″N 37°39′22.68″E
	Church of the **Protection of the Theotokos** on the Ostoshenka Храм Покрова Пресвятой Богородицы на Остоженке	1908	Old Believers (Old-Rite Church)	Khamovniki; 55°44′12″N 37°35′51″E
	Church of the **Protection of the Theotokos** in Rubtsovo Храм Покрова Пресвятой Богородицы в Рубцове	1626	Russian Orthodox (Yedinovertsy)	Basmanny; 55°46′54″N 37°41′43″E
	Church of the **Theotokos icon of the Sign** at the former Monastery of the Theotokos of the Sign Храм иконы Божией Матери «Знамение» в бывшем Знаменском монастыре	1684	Russian Orthodox	Tverskoy; 55°45′8.7″N 37°37′43.9″E
	Church of the **Theotokos icon of the Sign** at the Novospassky Monastery Храм иконы Божией Матери «Знамение» в Новоспасском монастыре	1795	Russian Orthodox	Tagansky; 55°43′55″N 37°39′21.3″E
	Church of the **Theotokos icon of the Sign** in Pereyaslavskaya Sloboda Храм иконы Божией Матери «Знамение» в Переяславской слободе	1766	Russian Orthodox	Meshchansky; 55°47′30.2″N 37°38′24.4″E
	Church of the **Theotokos icon of the Sign** behind the Petrovka Gate Храм иконы Божией Матери «Знамение» за Петровскими воротами	1679?	Russian Orthodox	Tverskoy; 55°46′9.4″N 37°36′52.3″E
	Church of the **Theotokos icon of the Sign** in the Sheremetev Yard Храм иконы Божией Матери «Знамение» на Шереметевом дворе	1691	Russian Orthodox	Arbat; 55°45′14″N 37°36′34″E
	Cathedral of the **Theotokos icon of Smolensk** at the New Maidens' Monastery Собор Смоленской иконы Божией Матери в Новодевичьем монастыре	1525	Russian Orthodox	Khamovniki; 55°43′33.3″N 37°33′24.2″E
	Church of the **Theotokos icon of Tikhvin** in Sushchovo Храм Тихвинской иконы Божией Матери в Сущёве	1694	Russian Orthodox	Tverskoy; 55°47′17.2″N 37°35′59.2″E
	Church of the **Theotokos icon of Tolga** at the former High Monastery of Saint Peter Храм Толгской иконы Божией Матери в бывшем Высоко-Петровском монастыре	1750	Russian Orthodox	Tverskoy; 55°45′58.7″N 37°36′57.5″E
	Cathedral of the **Transfiguration of Jesus** at the Novospassky Monastery Собор Спаса Преображения в Новоспасском монастыре	1647	Russian Orthodox	Tagansky; 55°43′55″N 37°39′23.3″E
	Church of the **Transfiguration of Jesus** on the Bolvanovka Храм Спаса Преображения на Болвановке	1755	Russian Orthodox	Zamoskvorechye; 55°44′4″N 37°37′53″E
	Church of the **Transfiguration of Jesus** over the North gate of the New Maidens' Monastery Храм Спаса Преображения над северными вратами Новодевичьего монастыря	1689	Russian Orthodox	Khamovniki; 55°43′36.6″N 37°33′28″E
	Church of the **Transfiguration of Jesus** on the Sand Храм Спаса Преображения на Песках	1711	Russian Orthodox	Arbat; 55°44′58″N 37°35′17.9″E
	Church of the **Three Holy Hierarchs** on the Swamp Храм Трёх Святителей на Кулишках	1674	Russian Orthodox	Basmanny; 55°45′15″N 37°38′40″E
	Church of the Holy **Trinity** in Khokhly Храм Живоначальной Троицы в Хохлах	1657	Russian Orthodox	Basmanny; 55°45′24.1″N 37°38′38.4″E
	Church of the Holy **Trinity** at the Metochion of the Trinity Monastery Храм Живоначальной Троицы на Троицком подворье	1706	Russian Orthodox	Meshchansky; 55°46′32.75″N 37°37′16.59″E
	Church of the Holy **Trinity** in Listy Храм Живоначальной Троицы в Листах	1661	Russian Orthodox	Meshchansky; 55°46′18.2″N 37°37′55.4″E
	Church of the Holy **Trinity** in Nikitniki Храм Живоначальной Троицы в Никитниках	1628	Russian Orthodox	Tverskoy; 55°45′14.5″N 37°37′52.9″E
	Church of the Holy **Trinity** on the Shabolovka Храм Живоначальной Троицы на Шаболовке	1747	Russian Orthodox	Yakimanka; 55°43′22.7″N 37°36′41.4″E
	Church of the Holy **Trinity** on the Mud Храм Живоначальной Троицы на Грязех	1861	Russian Orthodox	Basmanny; 55°45′34″N 37°38′38″E
	Church of the Holy **Trinity** in Serebrjaniki Храм Живоначальной Троицы в Серебряниках	1781	Russian Orthodox	Taganski; 55°45′0.02″N 37°38′40.42″E
	Church of the Holy **Trinity** in Vishnyaki Храм Живоначальной Троицы в Вишняках	1811	Russian Orthodox	Zamoskvorechye; 55°44′09″N 37°37′42″E
	Church of the Holy **Trinity** at the Charity House of Count N.P.Sheremetev Храм Живоначальной Троицы в Странноприимном доме графа Н.П.Шереметева	1810	Russian Orthodox	Meshchansky; 55°46′27.9″N 37°38′2.7″E
	Church of the Martyr **Tryphon** in Naprudnoye Храм мученика Трифона в Напрудном	1895	Russian Orthodox	Meshchansky; 55°47′17.8″N 37°37′36.2″E
	Church of the **Twelve Apostles** in the Kremlin Храм Двенадцати апостолов в Кремле	1656	Russian Orthodox	(unassigned); 55°45′5″N 37°37′2″E
	Church of the Ruler Vladimir in the Old Gardens Храм Святого равноапостольного князя Владимира в Старых Садех	1516	Russian Orthodox	Basmanny; 55°45′19″N 37°38′26″E

=== North ===
List of churches in the Northern Okrug
Picture	Name	Year of completion	Denomination	District
	Church of **All Saints** in Vsekhsvyatskoye Храм Всех Святых во Всехсвятском	1736	Russian Orthodox	Sokol; 55°48′14″N 37°30′50″E
	Church of the Martyr **Boniface** at the Central Psychiatric Oblast Hospital Храм мученика Вонифатия при Центральной областной психиатрической больнице	1998	Russian Orthodox	Aeroport; 55°48′0″N 37°33′19″E
	Church of the Orthodox Rulers **Boris and Gleb** in Degunino Храм благоверных князей Бориса и Глеба в Дегунине	1866	Russian Orthodox	West Degunino; 55°52′0.5″N 37°32′3.4″E
	Church of the **Nativity of Christ** in Cherkizovo Храм Рождества Христова в Черкизове	1789	Russian Orthodox	Molzhaninovsky; 55°56′58.6″N 37°21′11.7″E
	Church of the **Resurrection of Christ** in Sheremetyevo Храм Воскресения Христова в Шереметьеве	2002	Russian Orthodox	Molzhaninovsky; 55°58′4.9″N 37°26′14.8″E
	Church of the Martyr Saint **George** in Koptevo Храм великомученика Георгия Победоносца в Коптеве	1998	Russian Orthodox	Koptevo; 55°49′49.6″N 37°31′48.4″E
	Church of the Metropolitan Saint **Innocent of Moscow** in Beskudnikovskoye Храм святителя Иннокентия, митрополита Московского	2005	Russian Orthodox	Beskudnikovsky; 55°51′26.3″N 37°33′41.1″E
	Church of Bishop Saint **Mitrophan** Храм святителя Митрофана, епископа Воронежского	1895	Russian Orthodox	Savyolovsky; 55°48′12.3″N 37°33′47.5″E
	Church of Saint **Nicholas** at the Thatched Hut Храм Николая Чудотворца у Соломенной сторожки	1997 (Note: after a faithful reconstruction; originally 1916, destroyed 1935, the rest removed in the 1960s)	Russian Orthodox	Timiryazevsky; 55°49′6.7″N 37°34′5.4″E
	Church of the Czar and Martyr **Nicholas** and all Russian New Martyrs and Confessors Храм святого царя-мученика Николая и Всех Новомучеников и Исповедников российских	2005	Autonomous	Golovinsky; 55°50′20.54″N 37°30′5.51″E
	Church of the Venerable **Sergius of Radonezh** in Businovo Храм преподобного Сергия Радонежского в Бусинове	1859	Russian Orthodox	West Degunino; 55°52′59.7″N 37°29′55.5″E
	Church of the Annunciation in Petrovsky Park Храм Благовещения Пресвятой Богородицы в Петровском парке	1847	Russian Orthodox	Aeroport; 55°47′44.5″N 37°33′10.4″E
	Church of the **Theotokos icon "Our Lady of the Sign"** in Aksinyino Храм иконы Божией Матери «Знамение» в Аксиньине	1884	Russian Orthodox	Levoberezhny; 55°51′28.5″N 37°29′10.7″E
	Church of the **Theotokos icon "Our Lady of the Sign"** in Khovrino Храм иконы Божией Матери «Знамение» в Ховрине	1870	Russian Orthodox	Khovrino; 55°51′53″N 37°30′33.4″E
	Church of the **Theotokos icon of Vatopedi** Храм иконы Божией Матери «Отрада» (Ватопедской)	1909	Russian Orthodox	Khoroshyovsky; 55°46′49.8″N 37°32′48.4″E
	Church of the Holy **Trinity** at the former Cherkasski poor house Храм Живоначальной Троицы при бывшей Черкасской богадельне	1858	Russian Orthodox	Begovoi; 55°46′53.57″N 37°34′38.97″E
	Church of the **Hieromartyr Vladimir** at the Petrovsky Park Храм священномученика Владимира в Петровском парке	2002	Russian Orthodox	Aeroport; 55°47′45.51″N 37°33′5.86″E

=== Northeast ===
List of churches in the Northeastern Okrug
Picture	Name	Year of completion	Denomination	District
	Church of the Martyrs **Adrian and Natalia** in Babushkin Храм мучеников Адриана и Наталии в Бабушкине	1916	Russian Orthodox	Yaroslavsky; 55°51′55.5″N 37°41′58″E
	Church of the **Feast of the Cross** in Altuvyevo Храм Воздвижения Креста Господня в Алтуфьеве	1763	Russian Orthodox	Lianozovo; 55°54′29.2″N 37°35′10.4″E
	Church of the Martyrs **Faith, Hope and Charity and their Mother Sophia** at the Miusskoye cemetery Храм мучениц Веры, Надежды, Любови и матери их Софии на Миусском кладбище	1823	Russian Orthodox	Maryina roshcha 55°47′40.2″N 37°35′51.8″E
	Church of Saint **Nicholas** in Otradnoye Храм Николая Чудотворца в Отрадном	1997	Russian Orthodox	Otradnoye; 55°51′21.5″N 37°35′25.3″E
	Church of the Venerable **Seraphim of Sarov** in Rayevo Храм преподобного Серафима Саровского в Раеве	2006 (Note: Provisional church, to make way for a new construction)	Russian Orthodox	North Medvedkovo; 55°52′59.85″N 37°40′3.31″E
	Church of the Venerable **Sergius of Radonezh** in Bibirevo Храм преподобного Сергия Радонежского в Бибиреве	1894	Russian Orthodox	Bibirevo; 55°53′12.2″N 37°35′53.6″E
	Church of the Annunciation in Rayevo Храм Благовещения Пресвятой Богородицы в Раеве	1997	Russian Orthodox	Babushkinsky; 55°51′47.96″N 37°39′42.94″E
	Church of the **Deposition of the Robe** in Leonovo Храм Ризоположения в Леонове	1722	Russian Orthodox	Rostokino; 55°50′29″N 37°38′39″E
	Church of the **Dormition of the Theotokos** in Arkhangelskoye Tyurikovo Храм Успения Пресвятой Богородицы в Архангельском-Тюрикове	1758	Russian Orthodox	Severny; 55°55′4.06″N 37°33′17.47″E
	Church of the **Nativity of the Theotokos** in Butyrskaya Sloboda Храм Рождества Пресвятой Богородицы в Бутырской слободе	1684 (Note: Only the church bells preserved; services take place there)	Russian Orthodox	Butyrsky; 55°48′3.53″N 37°35′1.49″E
	Church of the **Nativity of the Theotokos** in Vladykino Храм Рождества Пресвятой Богородицы во Владыкине	1859	Russian Orthodox	Otradnoye; 55°50′57.1″N 37°35′2.4″E
	Church of the **Protection of the Theotokos** in Medvedkovo Храм Покрова Пресвятой Богородицы в Медведкове	1635	Russian Orthodox	South Medvedkovo; 55°51′55″N 37°38′16.9″E
	Church of the **Theotokos icon of Tikhvin** in Alekseyevskoye Храм Тихвинской иконы Божией Матери в Алексеевском	1680	Russian Orthodox	Alexeyevsky; 55°49′5.2″N 37°38′39.3″E
	Church of the **Theotokos icon "Unexpected Pleasure"** Храм иконы Божией Матери «Нечаянная радость»	1904	Russian Orthodox	Maryina roshcha 55°48′19″N 37°36′54″E
	Church of the **Theotokos icon of Vladimir** in Vinogradovo Храм Владимирской иконы Божией Матери в Виноградове	1777	Russian Orthodox	Severny; 55°56′33″N 37°32′47″E
	Church of the Holy **Trinity** in Ostankino Храм Живоначальной Троицы в Останкине	1683	Russian Orthodox	Ostankinsky; 55°49′27″N 37°36′49.2″E
	Church of the Holy **Trinity** at the Pyatnitskoye Cemetery Храм Живоначальной Троицы на Пятницком кладбище	1835	Russian Orthodox	Alexeyevsky; 55°47′59.7″N 37°38′22.2″E
	Church of the Holy **Trinity** in Sviblovo Храм Живоначальной Троицы в Свиблове	1708	Russian Orthodox	Maryina roshcha 55°51′11.5″N 37°37′55.3″E
	Church of the Hieromartyr **Saint Vladimir** in Sviblovo Храм священномученика Владимира в Свиблове	2009	Russian Orthodox	Sviblovo; 55°51′24.54″N 37°39′27.57″E
	**Holy Transfiguration Cathedral** Собор Преображения Господня	2013	Armenian Apostolic	Alexeyevsky; 55°47′17.02″N 37°37′16.3″E

=== East ===
List of churches in the Eastern Okrug
Picture	Name	Year of completion	Denomination	District
	Church of the Orthodox Ruler **Alexander Nevsky** in Kozhukhovo Храм благоверного князя Александра Невского в Кожухове	2008	Russian Orthodox	Kosino-Ukhtomsky; 55°42′9.13″N 37°40′7.06″E
	Church of **All Saints of Russia** in Novokosino Храм Всех Святых в земле российской просиявших в Новокосине	2010	Russian Orthodox	Novokosino; 55°44′11.34″N 37°50′47.09″E
	Church of the **Annunciation** in Sokolniki Церковь Благовещения Пресвятой Богородицы при бывших казармах Сапёрного батальона	1903	Russian Orthodox	Sokolniki; 55°47′06.88″N 37°41′19.89″E
	Church of the **Nativity of Christ** in Izmailovo Храм Рождества Христова в Измайлове	1664	Russian Orthodox	Izmailovo; 55°48′3″N 37°46′10″E
	Church of the **Resurrection of Christ** on the former Semyonovskoye Cemetery Храм Воскресения Христова на бывшем Семёновском кладбище	1855	Russian Orthodox	Sokolinaya gora 55°46′47″N 37°43′8″E
	Church of the **Resurrection of Christ** in Sokolniki Храм Воскресения Христова в Сокольниках	1913	Russian Orthodox	Sokolniki; 55°47′27.6″N 37°40′37.2″E
	Church of the **Transfiguration of Jesus** in Bogorodskoye Храм Спаса Преображения в Богородском	1880	Russian Orthodox	Bogorodskoye; 55°48′52.7″N 37°41′45.8″E
	Church of the Martyr **Demetrius of Thessaloniki** in Blagusha Храм великомученика Димитрия Солунского на Благуше	1911	Russian Orthodox	Sokolinaya gora 55°46′52″N 37°43′53″E
	Church of the Martyr **Demetrius of Thessaloniki** in Vostochny Храм великомученика Димитрия Солунского в посёлке Восточный	1997	Russian Orthodox	Vostochny; 55°49′8″N 37°51′35″E
	Church of the Prophet **Elijah** in Cherkizovo Храм пророка Илии в Черкизове	1690	Russian Orthodox	Preobrazhenskoye; 55°48′1″N 37°44′3″E
	Church of the **Feast of the Cross** on the Preobrazhenskoye Cemetery Храм Воздвижения Креста Господня на Преображенском кладбище	1801	Old Believers (priestless)	Preobrazhenskoye; 55°47′36″N 37°43′2″E
	Church of the Nativity of **John the Baptist** in Ivanovskoye Храм Рождества Иоанна Предтечи в Ивановском	1801	Russian Orthodox	Ivanovskoye; 55°46′8.5″N 37°50′21″E
	Church of the Nativity of **John the Baptist** in Sokolniki Храм Рождества Иоанна Предтечи в Сокольниках	1917	Russian Orthodox	Sokolniki; 55°47′56″N 37°41′40″E
	Church of the **Merciful Saviour** in Kuskovo Храм Спаса Всемилостивого в Кускове	1739	Russian Orthodox	Veshnyaki; 55°44′5″N 37°48′30″E
	Church of the **Holy Image of the Saviour Not Made by Hands** in Gireyevo Храм Спаса Нерукотворного Образа в Гирееве	1717	Russian Orthodox	Novogireyevo; 55°45′27.78″N 37°48′51.28″E
	Church of Saint **Nicholas** in the Izmailovo Kremlin Храм Николая Чудотворца в Измайлове	2000	Russian Orthodox	Izmailovo; 55°47′39.3″N 37°45′3.4″E
	Church of Saint **Nicholas** at the Medical Surgical Centre "Nikolay Ivanovich Pirogov" Храм Николая Чудотворца при Медико-хирургическом центре имени Н.И.Пирогова	2005	Russian Orthodox	East Izmailovo; 55°47′21.53″N 37°49′22.5″E
	Church of Saint **Nicholas** on the Preobrazhenskoye Cemetery Храм Николая Чудотворца на Преображенском кладбище	1784	Russian Orthodox	Preobrazhenskoye; 55°47′28″N 37°43′2″E
	**Seventh-day Adventist** Church Храм адвентистов седьмого дня	1998	(Seventh-day Adventist)	Golyanovo; 55°48′56.54″N 37°49′50.22″E
	Church of the **Dormition of the Theotokos** in Kosino Храм Успения Пресвятой Богородицы в Косине	1826	Russian Orthodox	Kosino-Ukhtomsky; 55°43′8.5″N 37°51′25.4″E
	Church of the **Dormition of the Theotokos** in Veshnyaki Храм Успения Пресвятой Богородицы в Вешняках	1646	Russian Orthodox	Veshnyaki; 55°43′25.2″N 37°47′54.5″E
	Church of the **Protection of the Theotokos** in Izmailovo Храм Покрова Пресвятой Богородицы в Измайлове	1679	Russian Orthodox	Izmailovo; 55°47′28″N 37°45′53″E
	Church of the **Theotokos icon "Our Lady of the Sign"** in Perovo Храм иконы Божией Матери «Знамение» в Перове	1705	Russian Orthodox	Perovo; 55°44′35.1″N 37°46′22.7″E
	Church of Saint **Tikhon** in Kosino Храм святителя Тихона, патриарха Всероссийского, в Косине	1980	Russian Orthodox	Kosino-Ukhtomsky; 55°43′8.76″N 37°51′26.59″E
	Church of Saint **Tikhon** in Sokolniki Храм святителя Тихона Задонского в Сокольниках	1863	Russian Orthodox	Sokolniki; 55°48′6″N 37°40′59″E
	Church of the Holy **Trinity** at the St. Vladimir Children's Hospital Храм Живоначальной Троицы при детской больнице святого Владимира	1883	Russian Orthodox	Sokolniki; 55°47′15″N 37°41′43″E
	Church of the Venerable **Zosima and Savvaty of Solovki** in Golyanovo Храм Преподобных Зосимы и Савватия Соловецких в Гольянове	1842	Russian Orthodox	Golyanovo; 55°49′6″N 37°48′51″E

=== Southeast ===
List of churches in the Southeastern Okrug
Picture	Name	Year of completion	Denomination	District
	Church of the **Entry of the Theotokos into the Temple of Jerusalem** on the Ryazanka Храм Введения во храм Пресвятой Богородицы на Рязанке	2009	Russian Orthodox	Ryazanski; 55°43′6″N 37°46′41.5″E
	Church of the **Entry of the Theotokos into the Temple of Jerusalem** on the Saltykov Bridge Храм Введения во храм Пресвятой Богородицы у Салтыкова моста	1825	Russian Orthodox	Lefortovo; 55°45′26″N 37°40′47″E
	Church of Blessed **John of Kronstadt** in Zhulebino Храм праведного Иоанна Кронштадского в Жулебине	1999	Russian Orthodox	Vykhino-Zhulebino; 55°41′33.9″N 37°51′6.1″E
	Church of the **Mat Maryam** Храм Мат Марьям	1998	Assyrian	Yuzhnoportovy; 55°43′7″N 37°40′24″E
	Church of Saint **Nicholas** in the Monastery of Saint Nicholas in Pererva Храм Николая Чудотворца в Николо-Перервинском монастыре	1700	Russian Orthodox	Pechatniki; 55°40′9.5″N 37°43′7.4″E
	Church of Saint **Nicholas** on the Rogozhskoye Cemetery Храм Николая Чудотворца на Рогожском кладбище	1776	Russian Orthodox	Nizhegorodsky; 55°44′25″N 37°42′9″E
	Church of Apostles **Peter and Paul** in Lefortovo Храм апостолов Петра и Павла в Лефортове	1711	Russian Orthodox	Lefortovo; 55°45′55.3″N 37°42′0.5″E
	Church of the Renewal of the **Church of the Resurrection of Christ** in Jerusalem at the Community Hospital Nr. 29 Храм Воскресения Словущего при Городской больнице № 29	1903	Russian Orthodox	Lefortovo; 55°46′1.1″N 37°42′6″E
	Church of the Venerable **Sergius of Radonezh** in Nekrasovka Храм преподобного Сергия Радонежского в Некрасовке	2001	Russian Orthodox	Nekrasovka; 55°40′56.24″N 37°54′51.72″E
Links im Bild	Church of the Venerable **Sergius of Radonezh** on the Ryazanka Храм преподобного Сергия Радонежского на Рязанке	2005	Russian Orthodox	Ryazanski; 55°43′4.5″N 37°46′39.1″E
	Church of the **Theotokos icon of Blachernae** in Kuzminki Храм Влахернской иконы Божией Матери в Кузьминках	1774	Russian Orthodox	Kuzminki; 55°41′26.1″N 37°47′25.4″E
	Church of the **Dormition of the Theotokos** at the bell tower of the Monastery of Saint Nicholas in Pererva Храм Успения Пресвятой Богородицы в колокольне Николо-Перервинского монастыря	1650	Russian Orthodox	Pechatniki; 55°40′10.8″N 37°43′10.8″E
	Cathedral of the **Theotokos Iverskaya of Iviron** at the Monastery of Saint Nicholas in Pererva Собор Иверской иконы Божией Матери в Николо-Перервинском монастыре	1908	Russian Orthodox	Pechatniki; 55°40′9.4″N 37°43′10.9″E
	Church of the **Theotokos icon "Joy of all who Sorrow"** on the Kalitniki Cemetery Храм иконы Божией Матери «Joy of all who Sorrow» на Калитниковском кладбище	1838	Russian Orthodox	Nizhegorodsky; 55°43′58.7″N 37°41′20.9″E
	Church of the **Nativity of the Theotokos** in Kapotnya Храм Рождества Пресвятой Богородицы в Капотне	1870	Russian Orthodox	Kapotnya; 55°38′21.3″N 37°47′30.9″E
	Church of the **Theotokos icon "Quench my Sorrow"** in Maryino Храм иконы Божией Матери «Утоли моя печали» в Марьине	2001	Russian Orthodox	Maryino; 55°38′53.8″N 37°44′51″E
	Church of the **Theotokos icon of Tolga** at the Monastery of Saint Nicholas in Pererva Храм Толгской иконы Божией Матери в Николо-Перервинском монастыре	1735	Russian Orthodox	Pechatniki; 55°40′8.7″N 37°43′11.6″E
	Church of the Patriarch **Tikhon of Moscow** in Lyublino Храм святителя Тихона, патриарха Всероссийского, в Люблине	2003	Russian Orthodox	Lyublino; 55°41′1.3″N 37°45′48.9″E
	Church of the Holy **Trinity** in Karacharovo Храм Живоначальной Троицы в Карачарове	1774	Russian Orthodox	Nizhegorodsky; 55°43′53.7″N 37°43′56.8″E
	Church of the Holy **Trinity** on the Saltykov Bridge Храм Живоначальной Троицы у Салтыкова моста	1817	Russian Orthodox	Lefortovo; 55°45′26″N 37°40′47″E

=== South ===
List of churches in the Southern Okrug
Picture	Name	Year of completion	Denomination	District
	Church of the Metropolitan **Alexius of Moscow** at the Central Hospital of the Moscow Patriarchy Храм святителя Алексия, митрополита Московского, при Центральной клинической больнице Московской патриархии	1904	Russian Orthodox	Donskoy; 55°42′56.89″N 37°35′35.76″E
	Church of the **Ascension of Christ** in Kolomenskoye Храм Вознесения Господня в Коломенском	1532	Russian Orthodox	Nagatinsky Zaton; 55°40′2″N 37°40′15″E
	Church of the Orthodox Ruler **Dmitry Donskoy** in Sadovniki Храм благоверного князя Дмитрия Донского в Садовниках	2005	Russian Orthodox	Nagatino-Sadovniki; 55°39′35.83″N 37°38′57.48″E
	Church of the Feast Day of the **Decapitation of John the Baptist** in Brateyevo Храм Усекновения главы Иоанна Предтечи в Братееве	2000	Russian Orthodox	Brateyevo; 55°37′53.54″N 37°45′53.42″E
	Church of the Feast Day of the **Decapitation of John the Baptist** in Dyakovo Храм Усекновения главы Иоанна Предтечи в Дьякове	1547	Russian Orthodox	Nagatinsky Zaton; 55°39′50.3″N 37°40′8.5″E
	Church of the Martyr Saint **George** in Kolomenskoye Храм великомученика Георгия Победоносца в Коломенском	16th century	Russian Orthodox	Nagatinsky Zaton; 55°40′1.5″N 37°40′11.9″E
	Church of the **Outpouring of the Holy Spirit** at the Danilov Cemetery Храм Сошествия Святого Духа на Даниловском кладбище	1838	Russian Orthodox	Donskoy; 55°42′13.4″N 37°36′32.4″E
	Church of the Archangel **Michael** at the Donskoy Monastery Храм Архангела Михаила в Донском монастыре	1714	Russian Orthodox	Donskoy; 55°42′48.4″N 37°36′6.5″E
	Church of the Archangel **Michael** in Tsaritsyno Храм Архистратига Божия Михаила в Царицыно	2015	Russian Orthodox	Tsaritsyno; 55°37′20.7″N 37°40′16.5″E
	Church of Saint **Nicholas** in Biryulyovo Храм Николая Чудотворца в Бирюлёве	1912	Russian Orthodox	Biryulyovo West; 55°35′23.5″N 37°39′4″E
	Church of Saint **Nicholas** in Saburovo Храм Николая Чудотворца в Сабурове	1595	Russian Orthodox	Moskvorechye-Saburovo; 55°38′23.1″N 37°42′0.3″E
	Church of the Renewal of the **Church of the Resurrection of Christ** in Jerusalem in Danilovskaya Sloboda Храм Воскресения Словущего в Даниловской слободе	1837	Russian Orthodox	Danilovsky; 55°42′34.69″N 37°37′47.99″E
	Church of the Venerable **Seraphim of Sarov** and the Orthodox Ruler **Anna of Kashin** at the Donskoy Cemetery Храм преподобного Серафима Саровского и благоверной княгини Анны Кашинской на Донском кладбище	1910	Russian Orthodox	Donskoy; 55°42′43.7″N 37°36′10.5″E
	Cathedral of the Holy Fathers of the **Seven Ecumenical Councils** at the Danilov Monastery Собор Святых отцов Семи Вселенских Соборов в Даниловом монастыре	1752	Russian Orthodox	Danilovsky; 55°42′38.5″N 37°37′52.6″E
	Church of the Venerable **Simeon Stylites** at the Danilov Monastery Храм преподобного Симеона Столпника в Даниловом монастыре	1732	Russian Orthodox	Danilovsky; 55°42′40.5″N 37°37′50.8″E
	Church of the **Deposition of the Robe** at the Donskaya Храм Ризоположения на Донской	1705	Russian Orthodox	Donskoy; 55°43′12.1″N 37°36′15.4″E
	Big Cathedral of the **Theotokos icon of the Don** at the Donskoy Monastery Большой собор Донской иконы Божией Матери в Донском монастыре	1698	Russian Orthodox	Donskoy; 55°42′52.4″N 37°36′7.8″E
	Small Cathedral of the **Theotokos icon of the Don** at the Donskoy Monastery Малый собор Донской иконы Божией Матери в Донском монастыре	1593	Russian Orthodox	Donskoy; 55°42′50.3″N 37°36′9.1″E
	Church of the **Dormition of the Theotokos** at the Kotlyakovo Cemetery Храм Успения Пресвятой Богородицы на Котляковском кладбище	2005	Russian Orthodox	Tsaritsyno; 55°37′19.15″N 37°38′20.47″E
	Church of the **Theotokos icon Derzhavnaya** in Chertanovo Храм иконы Божией Матери «Державная» в Чертанове	2010	Russian Orthodox	Chertanovo Centre; 55°38′6.02″N 37°36′10.39″E
	Church of the **Theotokos icon "Our Lady of Kazan"** in Kolomenskoye Храм Казанской иконы Божией Матери в Коломенском	1653	Russian Orthodox	Nagatinsky Zaton; 55°40′7.2″N 37°40′4.2″E
	Church of the **Theotokos icon "Life-giving Spring"** in Tsaritsyno Храм иконы Божией Матери «Живоносный Источник» в Царицыне	1722	Russian Orthodox	Tsaritsyno; 55°37′1″N 37°40′53″E
	Church of the **Nativity of the Theotokos** in Staroye Simonovo Храм Рождества Пресвятой Богородицы в Старом Симонове	1510	Russian Orthodox	Danilovsky; 55°42′40″N 37°39′14.5″E
	Church of the **Protection of the Theotokos** on the Gorodnya Храм Покрова Пресвятой Богородицы на Городне	1722	Russian Orthodox	Chertanovo South; 55°36′11.9″N 37°37′40.2″E
	Church of the **Theotokos icon of Tikhvin** at the Central Hospital of the Moscow Patriarchy Храм Тихвинской иконы Божией Матери при Центральной клинической больнице Московской Патриархии	1904	Russian Orthodox	Donskoy; 55°42′58.24″N 37°35′37.85″E
	Church of the **Theotokos icon of Tikhvin** above the Northern Gate of the Donskoy Monastery Храм Тихвинской иконы Божией Матери над северными вратами Донского монастыря	1714	Russian Orthodox	Donskoy; 55°42′56.3″N 37°36′6.2″E
	Church of the **Theotokos icon of Tikhvin** at the former Simonov Monastery Храм Тихвинской иконы Божией Матери в бывшем Симоновом монастыре	1683	Russian Orthodox	Danilovsky; 55°42′50″N 37°39′25.7″E
	Church of the **Theotokos icon "Troyeruchitsa"** Храм иконы Божией Матери «Троеручица»	2005	Russian Orthodox	South Orekhovo-Borisovo; 55°36′21.76″N 37°43′16.43″E
	Church of the Apostle **Thomas** on the Kantemirovskaya Храм апостола Фомы на Кантемировской	2006	Russian Orthodox	Moskvorechye-Saburovo; 55°38′33.38″N 37°39′14.24″E
	Cathedral of the Holy **Trinity** at the Danilov Monastery Собор Живоначальной Троицы в Даниловом монастыре	1838	Russian Orthodox	Danilovsky; 55°42′38.8″N 37°37′47.4″E
	Church of the Holy **Trinity** at the Borisovo Ponds Храм Живоначальной Троицы на Борисовских прудах	2004	Russian Orthodox	Orekhovo-Borisovo North; 55°37′38.6″N 37°42′42.8″E
	Church of the Holy **Trinity** in Borisovo Храм Живоначальной Троицы в Борисове	1887?	Russian Orthodox	Orekhovo-Borisovo North; 55°37′47.3″N 37°43′43.5″E
	Church of the Holy **Trinity** in Chertanovo Храм Живоначальной Троицы в Чертанове	2005	Russian Orthodox	Chertanovo Centre; 55°36′57.89″N 37°35′2.51″E
	Church of the Holy **Trinity** in Kozhevnichesky Храм Живоначальной Троицы в Кожевниках	1689	Russian Orthodox	Danilovsky; 55°43′37.1″N 37°38′53.7″E
	Church of the Blessed **Zechariah and Elizabeth** at the Bell Tower of the Donskoy Monastery Храм праведных Захария и Елисаветы в колокольне Донского монастыря	1732	Russian Orthodox	Donskoy; 55°42′51.4″N 37°36′0.7″E
	Church of the **Holy Trinity** or **Shuvoe Trinity Church** Храм Святыя Троицы	1924	Old Believers (Old-Rite Church)	Yegoryevsky
	Church of **John Climacus** in Kurovskoye Единоверческая церковь Иоанна Лествичника в Куровском	2000	Russian Orthodox (Yedinovertsy)	Orekhovo-Zuyevsky

=== Southwest ===
List of churches in the Southwestern Okrug
Picture	Name	Year of completion	Denomination	District
	Church of Saint **Anastasia of Sirmium** in Tyoply Stan Храм великомученицы Анастасии Узорешительницы в Тёплом Стане	2003	Russian Orthodox	Tyoply Stan; 55°37′31.6″N 37°29′26.1″E
	Church of the Martyr **Andrew Stratelates** at the former Andrew Monastery Храм мученика Андрея Стратилата в бывшем Андреевском монастыре	1675	Russian Orthodox	Gagarinski; 55°42′43.4″N 37°34′33.1″E
	Church of the Orthodox Rulers **Boris and Gleb** in Zyuzino Храм благоверных князей Бориса и Глеба в Зюзине	1688	Russian Orthodox	Zyuzino; 55°39′31″N 37°34′48″E
	Church of the **Resurrection of Christ** at the former Andrew Monastery Храм Воскресения Христова в бывшем Андреевском монастыре	1701	Russian Orthodox	Gagarinski; 55°42′42″N 37°34′28.9″E
	Church of the **Nativity of Christ** in Chernyovo Храм Рождества Христова в Чернёве	1722	Russian Orthodox	South Butovo; 55°32′15.2″N 37°31′29.7″E
	Church of the Holy **Trinity** in Konkovo Храм Живоначальной Троицы в Конькове	1694	Russian Orthodox	Konkovo; 55°38′17.87″N 37°31′9.47″E
	Church of the Holy **Trinity** in Starye Cheryomushki Храм Живоначальной Троицы в Старых Черёмушках	1732	Russian Orthodox	Akademicheski; 55°41′29.1″N 37°35′39.6″E
	Church of the Holy **Trinity** in Vorontsovo Храм Живоначальной Троицы в Воронцове	1807	Russian Orthodox	Obruchevsky; 55°40′4.3″N 37°32′26.4″E
	Church of the **Theotokos icon "Our Lady of Kazan"** in Uzkoye Храм Казанской иконы Божией Матери в Узком	1704	Russian Orthodox	Yasenevo; 55°37′17.5″N 37°32′12.1″E
	Church of the **Theotokos icon "Our Lady of the Sign"** at the Institute of Theoratical and Practical Physics Храм иконы Божией Матери «Знамение» при Институте Теоретической и Экспериментальной Физики	1747	Russian Orthodox	Kotlovka; 55°40′45.35″N 37°35′16.43″E
	Church of the **Theotokos icon "Our Lady of the Sign"** in Zakharjino Храм иконы Божией Матери «Знамение» в Захарьине	1672	Russian Orthodox	South Butovo; 55°29′47″N 37°35′16″E
	Church of the Apostle **John** at the former Andrew Monastery Храм апостола Иоанна Богослова в бывшем Андреевском монастыре	1748	Russian Orthodox	Gagarinski; 55°42′42.6″N 37°34′31.2″E
	Church of the Venerable **Joseph of Volokolamsk** Храм преподобного Иосифа Волоцкого	2006	Russian Orthodox	Obruchevsky; 55°39′32.21″N 37°31′31.15″E
	Church of Saint **Pantaleon** in South Butovo Храм великомученика Пантелеимона в Южном Бутове	2010	Russian Orthodox	South Butovo; 55°31′53.75″N 37°29′54.04″E
	Church of the Martyr **Paraskeva Pyatnitsa** in Kachalovo Храм мученицы Параскевы Пятницы в Качалове	1694	Russian Orthodox	North Butovo; 55°34′17.7″N 37°34′50.7″E
	Church of the Apostles **Peter and Paul** in Yasenevo Храм апостолов Петра и Павла в Ясеневе	1753	Russian Orthodox	Yasenevo; 55°36′0″N 37°32′57.3″E
	Church of the **Intercession of the Holy Virgin** in Yasenevo Храм Покрова Пресвятой Богородицы в Ясеневе	2015	Russian Orthodox	Yasenevo; 55°36′54″N 37°32′24″E

=== West ===
List of churches in the Western Okrug
Picture	Name	Year of completion	Denomination	District
	Church of the Venerable **Andrey Rublev** in Ramenki Храм преподобного Андрея Рублёва в Раменках	2000	Russian Orthodox	Ramenki; 55°41′40.59″N 37°29′42.63″E
	Church of the Annunciation in Fedossyino Храм Благовещения Пресвятой Богородицы в Федосьине	1854	Russian Orthodox	Novo-Peredelkino; 55°38′31″N 37°20′12.4″E
	Church of the Metropolitan **Dimitry of Rostov** in Otshakovo Храм святителя Димитрия Ростовского в Очакове	1759	Russian Orthodox	Ochakovo-Matveyevskoye; 55°41′23.4″N 37°26′34.3″E
	Church of the Martyr **George** at the Moscow regional centre of the Ministry of Emergencies Храм великомученика Георгия Победоносца при Московском региональном центре МЧС РФ	1998	Russian Orthodox	Fili-Davydkovo; 55°43′35.61″N 37°28′54.31″E
	Church of the Martyr Saint **George** on the Poklonnaya Hill Храм великомученика Георгия Победоносца на Поклонной горе	1995	Russian Orthodox	Dorogomilovo; 55°43′56.6″N 37°30′43.7″E
	Church of the **Holy Image of the Saviour Not Made by Hands** at Setun (at the Kuntsevo Cemetery) Храм Спаса Нерукотворного Образа на Сетуни (на Кунцевском кладбище)	1676	Russian Orthodox	Mozhaysky; 55°42′34.9″N 37°25′10.7″E
	Church of the **Holy Image of the Saviour Not Made by Hands** at the Volynskoye hospital Храм Спаса Нерукотворного Образа при Волынской больнице	1999	Russian Orthodox	Ochakovo-Matveyevskoye; 55°43′4.65″N 37°28′50.33″E
	Church of Righteous John the Russian in Kuntsevo Храм святого праведного Иоанна Русского в Кунцеве	2004	Russian Orthodox	Kuntsevo; 55°44′4.9″N 37°24′22.2″E
	Church of the Archangel **Michael** at the military base in Yekaterinovka Храм Архангела Михаила при военной базе в Екатериновке	1999	Russian Orthodox	Krylatskoye; 55°46′11.4″N 37°22′45.3″E
	Church of the Archangel **Michael** in Troparyovo Храм Архангела Михаила в Тропарёве	1693	Russian Orthodox	Troparyovo-Nikulino; 55°39′21″N 37°28′45″E
	Church of the **Nativity of the Theotokos** in Krylatskoye Храм Рождества Пресвятой Богородицы в Крылатском	1877	Russian Orthodox	Krylatskoye; 55°45′20.3″N 37°25′33.2″E
	Church of Saint **Nicholas** in Troyekurovo Храм Николая Чудотворца в Троекурове	1706	Russian Orthodox	Ochakovo-Matveyevskoye; 55°42′10.6″N 37°24′41.1″E
	Church of the **Protection of the Theotokos** in Fili Храм Покрова Пресвятой Богородицы в Филях	1694	Russian Orthodox	Filyovsky park 55°45′2.5″N 37°30′37″E
	Church of the Venerable **Seraphim of Sarov** in the Fili meadow Храм преподобного Серафима Саровского в Филёвской пойме	2004	Russian Orthodox	Filyovsky park 55°45′48.6″N 37°28′40.8″E
	Church of the Venerable **Seraphim of Sarov** in Kuntsevo Храм преподобного Серафима Саровского в Кунцеве	2006	Russian Orthodox	Mozhaysky; 55°43′22.7″N 37°26′3.1″E
	Church of the Venerable **Sergius of Radonezh** in Solntsevo Храм преподобного Сергия Радонежского в Солнцеве	2010	Russian Orthodox	Solntsevo; 55°39′3.03″N 37°23′27.14″E
	Church of the **Theotokos icon "Our Lady of the Sign"** in Kuntsevo Храм иконы Божией Матери «Знамение» в Кунцеве	1913	Russian Orthodox	Filyovsky park 55°44′15.8″N 37°27′45″E
	Church of the **Transfiguration of Jesus** in Peredelkino Храм Спаса Преображения в Переделкине	1819	Russian Orthodox	Novo-Peredelkino; 55°39′27″N 37°20′50.2″E
	Church of the Holy **Trinity** on the Sparrow Hills Храм Живоначальной Троицы на Воробьёвых горах	1813	Russian Orthodox	Ramenki; 55°42′38.1″N 37°32′25.5″E
	Church of the Holy **Trinity** in Troitse-Golenishchevo Храм Живоначальной Троицы в Троице-Голенищеве	1644	Russian Orthodox	Ramenki; 55°43′19″N 37°31′18″E

=== Northwest ===
List of churches in the Northwestern Okrug
Picture	Name	Year of completion	Denomination	District
	Church of the Orthodox Ruler **Alexander Nevsky** at the military basis Kurkino Храм благоверного князя Александра Невского при воинской части в Куркине	1996	Russian Orthodox	Kurkino; 55°53′38.41″N 37°23′17.43″E
	Church of **Christ's Nativity** in Roshdestveno Храм Рождества Христова в Рождествене	1904	Russian Orthodox	Mitino; 55°51′38.6″N 37°22′3.8″E
	Church of the Saints **Cosmas and Damian** in Kozmodemyanskoye Храм Космы и Дамиана в Космодемьянском	1730	Russian Orthodox	Northern Tushino; 55°52′49.3″N 37°27′19.2″E
	Church of the **Dormition of the Theotokos** in Troitse-Lykovo Храм Успения Пресвятой Богородицы в Троице-Лыкове	1852	Russian Orthodox	Strogino; 55°47′25.64″N 37°24′20.31″E
	Church of Saint **Pantaleon** at the hospital of the Russian Railways Храм великомученика Пантелеимона при больнице Российских железных дорог	2000	Russian Orthodox	Pokrovskoye-Streshnevo; 55°49′9.31″N 37°27′22.29″E
	Church of the **Protection of the Theotokos** in Brattsevo Храм Покрова Пресвятой Богородицы в Братцеве	1672	Russian Orthodox	Southern Tushino; 55°51′10.9″N 37°24′5″E
	Church of the **Protection of the Theotokos** in Pokrovskoye-Glebovo Храм Покрова Пресвятой Богородицы в Покровском-Глебове	1628	Russian Orthodox	Pokrovskoye-Streshnevo; 55°48′52.9″N 37°28′17.9″E
	Church of the **Theotokos icon "Fast Novice"** on the Khodynka Field Храм иконы Божией Матери «Скоропослушница» на Ходынском поле	1902	Russian Orthodox	Shchukino; 55°47′52.7″N 37°29′28.9″E
	Church of the **Theotokos icon of Vladimir** in Kurkino Храм Владимирской иконы Божией Матери в Куркине	1678	Russian Orthodox	Kurkino; 55°53′23″N 37°22′50″E
	Church of the **Transfiguration of Jesus** in Tushino Храм Спаса Преображения в Тушине	1875	Russian Orthodox	Southern Tushino; 55°49′54.7″N 37°24′7.7″E
	Church of the Holy **Trinity** in Khoroshovo Храм Живоначальной Троицы в Хорошёве	1598	Russian Orthodox	Khoroshyovo-Mnyovniki; 55°46′34″N 37°27′24.5″E
	Church of the Holy **Trinity** in Troitse-Lykovo Храм Живоначальной Троицы в Троице-Лыкове	1702	Russian Orthodox	Strogino; 55°47′19.4″N 37°24′22.6″E
	**Tushino Pentecostal Church** Тушинские евангелисты	1957	Pentecostal	Mitino; 55°50′20.59″N 37°24′35.11″E

=== Zelenograd ===
List of churches in Zelenograd
Picture	Name	Year of completion	Denomination	District
	Evangelical **Baptist** church in Zelenograd Церковь Евангельских христиан-баптистов	2006	Union of Evangelical Christians-Baptists	Silino; 55°59′31.09″N 37°10′59.74″E
A red church with black roofs	Church of Saint **Nicholas** in Rzhavki Храм Николая Чудотворца в Ржавках	1827	Russian Orthodox	Savyolki; 55°59′43.2″N 37°14′36.9″E
A small, wooden church	Church of Metropolitan **Philaret of Moscow** in Zelenograd Храм святителя Филарета, митрополита Московского, в Зеленограде	1994	Russian Orthodox	Silino; 55°59′29.7″N 37°10′50.9″E

== See also ==
- Cathedral of the Immaculate Conception (Moscow)
