= Vostochny =

Vostochny (masculine), Vostochnaya (feminine), or Vostochnoye (neuter) may refer to:

- Vostochny District, name of several districts and city districts in Russia
- Vostochny, Kyrgyzstan, a town in Kyrgyzstan
- Vostochny, Russia (Vostochnaya, Vostochnoye), name of several inhabited localities in Russia
- Vostochny Cosmodrome, a cosmodrome in Amur Oblast, Russia
- Vostochny Port, a port in Primorsky Krai, Russia
- Vostochny, alternative name of the Tashkent International Airport in Uzbekistan
- Vostochny Bank
