= Forty Martyrs =

Forty Martyrs may refer to:

- Forty Martyrs of England and Wales, a group of Catholics martyred between 1535 and 1679
- Forty Martyrs of Sebaste, Roman soldiers martyred c. 320 in Roman Armenia
- Forty Martyrs of Brazil a.k.a. Forty Martyrs of Tazacorte, a group of Jesuits en route to Brazil martyred in 1570 by Huguenot privateers

== See also ==
- Church of the Martyrs (disambiguation)
