= Church of the Martyrs (disambiguation) =

Church of the Martyrs primarily refers to the Melitians, followers of Melitius of Lycopolis in North Africa in the fourth century (C.E.).

It may also refer to:

- Church of the Martyrs, Leicester, in Leicester, England, see Anglican churches in Leicester
- Church of the Martyrs, Raqqa, in Raqqa, Syria

== See also ==
- Church of Croatian Martyrs, Čavoglave, in Čavoglave, Croatia
- Church of Croatian Martyrs, Udbina, in Udbina, Croatia
- Church of the Forty Martyrs of Sebaste, in Moscow, see List of churches in Moscow
- Church of the Holy Martyrs, Marrakech, in Marrakech, Morocco, see Roman Catholicism in Morocco
- Church of the Holy Martyrs, Taybat al-Imam, in Taybat al-Imam, Syria
- Church of the Irish Martyrs, in Letterkenny, Ireland
- Church of the Martyrs Adrian and Natalia, in Babushkin, see List of churches in Moscow
- Church of the Martyrs Fides, Spes, Caritas and their Mother Sophia, in Moscow, see List of churches in Moscow
- Church of the Martyrs Frol and Lavr, in Zatsep, see List of churches in Moscow
- Church of the Nine Martyrs of Cyzicus, in Moscow, see List of churches in Moscow
- Forty Martyrs Cathedral, in Aleppo, Syria
- Forty Martyrs Church, Rotherham, in the Parish of St Bede's Church, Rotherham, England
- Holy Forty Martyrs Church, Veliko Tarnovo
- Martyrs' Free Church, in Edinburgh, Scotland, see George IV Bridge
- Forty Saints Monastery, Sarandë, in Albania
