= Church of Righteous John the Russian =

Church of Righteous John the Russian in Kuntsevo
- Храм святого праведного Иоанна Русского в Кунцеве, Москва
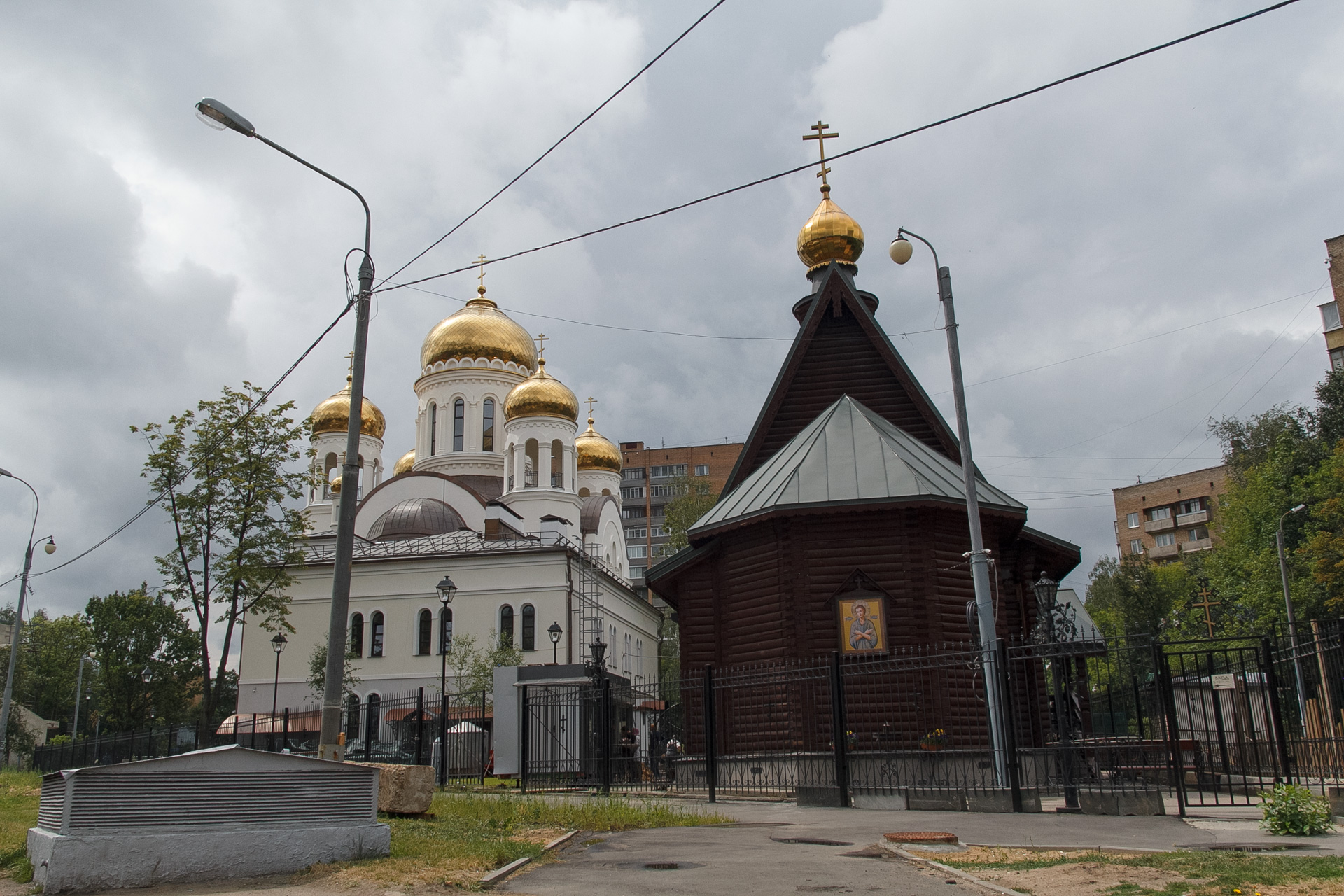
- The church complex of Righteous John the Russian as viewed from the Yartsevskaya str.
- Church of Righteous John the Russian in Kuntsevo
- 55°44′3.95″N 37°24′19.32″E
- Location: Moscow
- Country: Russia
- Denomination: Russian Orthodox
- Website: http://ioannrus.ru

History
- Status: Active
- Founded: 2004
- Dedication: Saint John the Russian
- Consecrated: 7 July 2016

Architecture
- Style: Russian traditional

Church of Righteous John the Russian in Kuntsevo is an orthodox church in Moscow, Russia, in Kuntsevo district of Western Administrative Okrug.

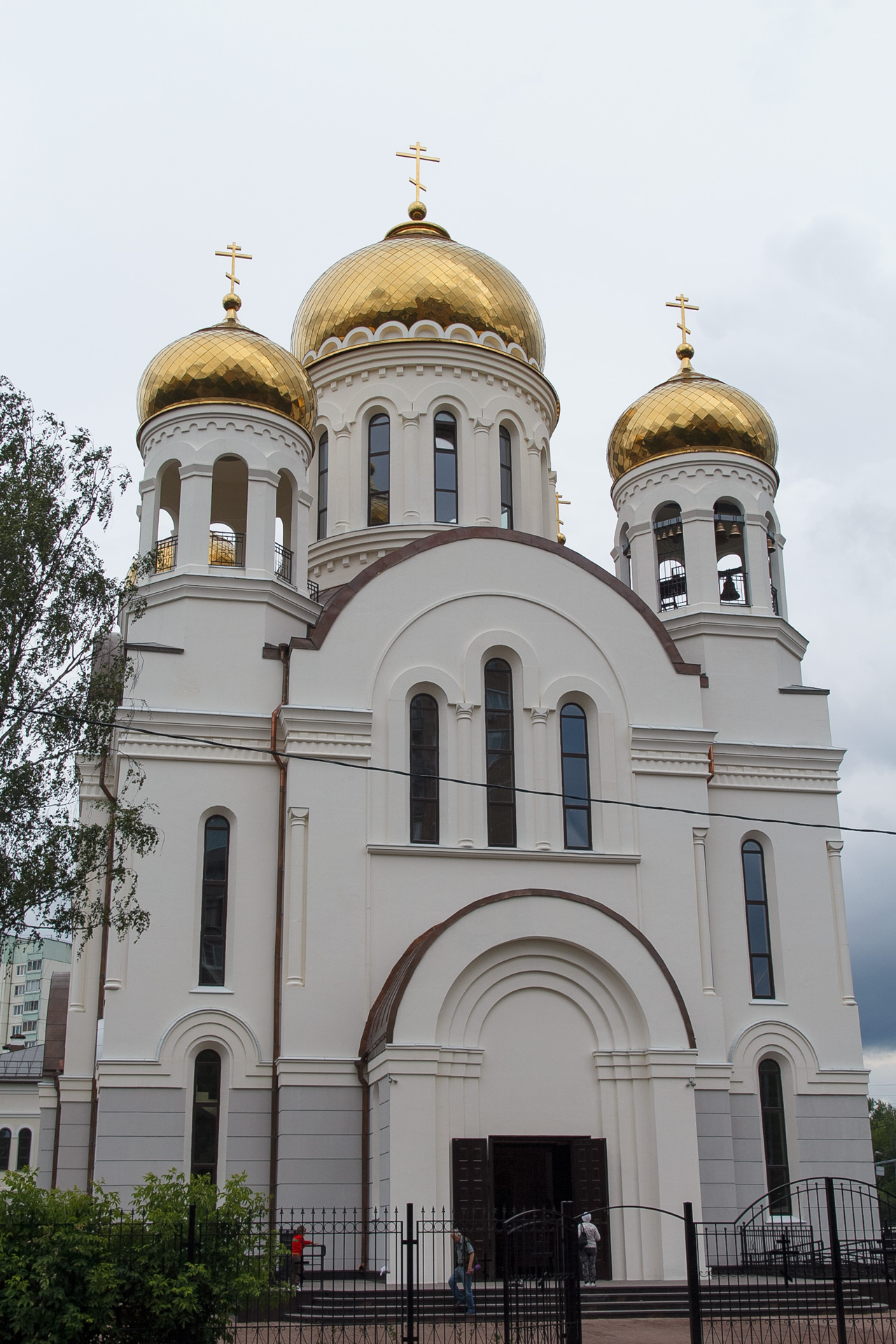
Stone church of Righteous John the Russian in Moscow. View from west.

The church belongs to the Deanery (Blagochiniye) of St. George, Western Vicariate, Urban Diocese of Moscow of Russian Orthodox Church.

== Church complex ==
7 July 2016 the head of the Western Vicariate of Moscow Bishop Tikhon of Yegoryevsk consecrated the erected church by the brief rite.

2 April 2017 Patriarch Kirill of Moscow and all Rus' consecrated the church by the great rite.

== Monument ==
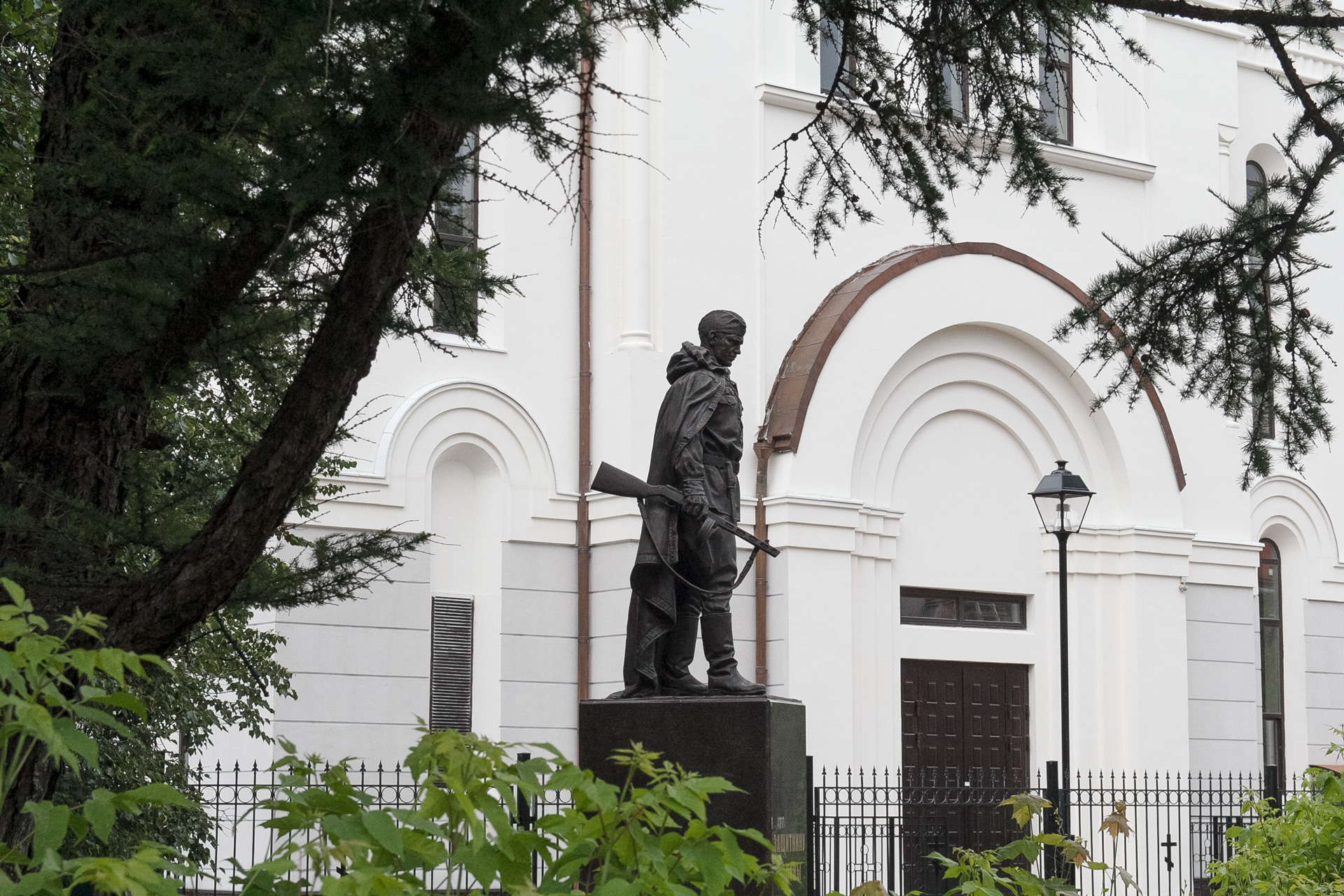
The monument of The Defender of Motherland

On 8 May 2015, the day before 60th anniversary of the Victory in the Great Patriotic War, upon an initiative of parishioners a monument of The Defender of Motherland was erected beside the church. The monument depicts a tired soldier in Second World War Soviet army uniform, holding a PPSh-41 with its barrel pointing downwards, seemingly returning home after the victory in World War II.

== See also ==
- Saint John the Russian
- Kuntsevo district of Moscow
- List of churches in Moscow
