= Vostochny District =

Vostochny District is the name of several administrative and municipal districts in Russia. The name literally means "eastern".

== Districts of the federal subjects ==
Location of Moscow in Russia

- Vostochny District, Moscow, a district in Eastern Administrative Okrug of Moscow

== City divisions ==
- Vostochny Okrug, Belgorod, an okrug of the city of Belgorod, the administrative center of Belgorod Oblast
- Vostochny City District, Novorossiysk, a city district of Novorossiysk, a city in Krasnodar Krai
- Vostochny Administrative Okrug, Tyumen, an administrative okrug of the city of Tyumen, the administrative center of Tyumen Oblast
Cities in Russia with a city division called "Vostochny"

== Historical city divisions ==
- Vostochny City District, Biysk, a city district of Biysk, a city in Altai Krai; existed in 1975–1998

== See also ==
- Vostochny (disambiguation)
- Vostochny Okrug (disambiguation)
- Eastern (disambiguation)
