= Vostochny Okrug =

Vostochny Okrug may refer to:

- Eastern Administrative Okrug (Vostochny administrativny okrug), an administrative okrug of Moscow, Russia
- Vostochny Administrative Okrug, Tyumen, a division of the city of Tyumen, Russia
- Vostochny Okrug, Belgorod, a division of the city of Belgorod, Russia
