= Vostochny, Russia =

Vostochny (Russian: Восто́чный; masculine), Vostochnaya (Восто́чная; feminine), or Vostochnoye (Восто́чное; neuter) is the name of several inhabited localities in Russia.

Urban localities

- Vostochny, Kirov Oblast, an urban-type settlement in Omutninsky District of Kirov Oblast

Rural localities

- Vostochny, Kemerovo Oblast, a settlement in Mezhdurechensky District of Kemerovo Oblast
- Vostochny, Sakhalin Oblast, a village in Sakhalin Oblast
- Vostochny, Sverdlovsk Oblast, a settlement in Sverdlovsk Oblast
- Vostochny, name of several other rural localities
- Vostochnaya, Krasnodar Krai, a stanitsa in Ust-Labinsky District of Krasnodar Krai
- Vostochnaya, name of several other rural localities
- Vostochnoye, Astrakhan Oblast, a selo in Ikryaninsky District of Astrakhan Oblast
- Vostochnoye, name of several other rural localities

== See also ==
- Vostok
