= Joy of All Who Sorrow =

Eastern Orthodox title for Mary, the mother of Jesus

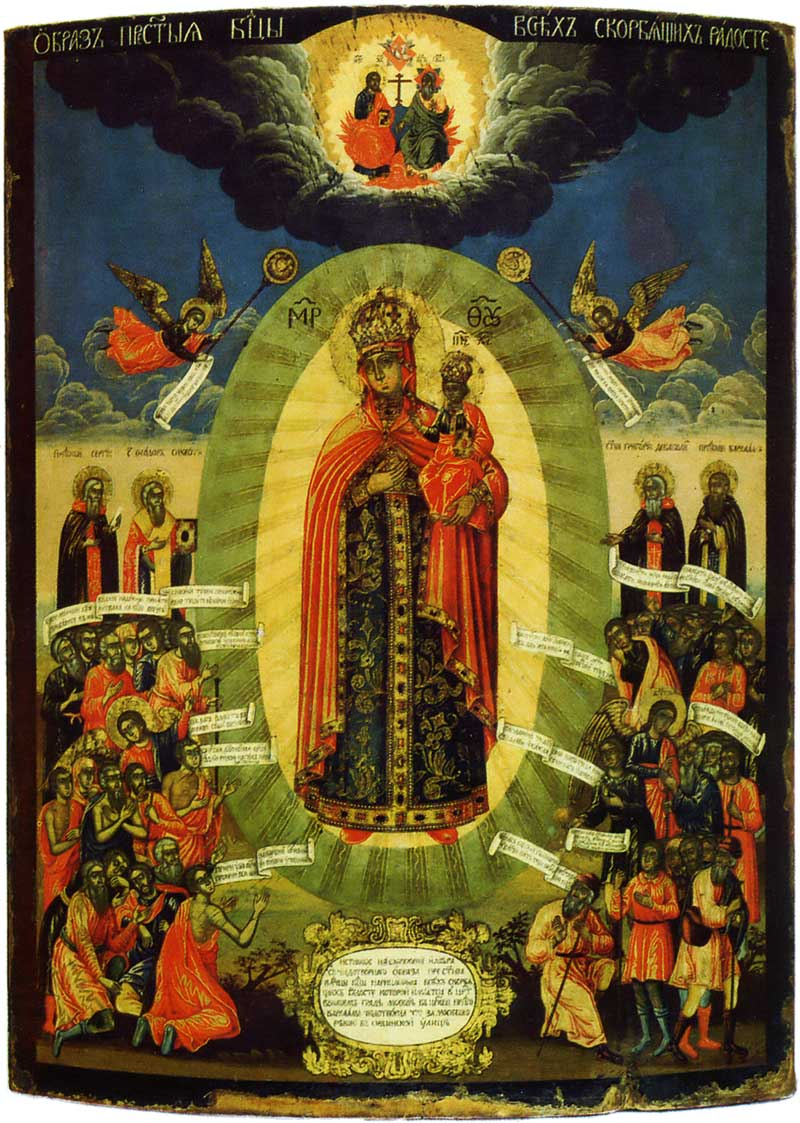
Russian icon of the Mother of God, Joy of All Who Sorrow, 18th century

The Joy of All Who Sorrow or the Joy of All Afflicted (Russian: Всех скорбящих Радость) is the name of an icon and a title given to the Theotokos (Mary, mother of Jesus). The iconography is specifically Russian, without Byzantine precedent. In Russian Orthodoxy, it is revered as a miraculous icon. The icon was first glorified in 1648 after, according to tradition, the sister of Russian patriarch Joachim was healed through prayer before the icon.

== Background ==
It is also a type of icon that depicts the Theotokos in a specific manner, standing beneath her Son, who is in Heaven as a king, and surrounded by people and angels. In addition, specific hymns are dedicated to celebrating her role of bringing hope and salvation into the world, thus becoming joy for all who sorrow:

"To Thee, the champion leader, do we Thy servants dedicate a hymn of victory and thanksgiving, as ones who have been delivered from eternal death by the Grace of Christ our God Who was born of Thee and by Thy maternal mediation before Him. As Thou dost have invincible might, free us from all misfortunes and sorrowful circumstances who cry aloud:

Rejoice, O Virgin Theotokos, full of Grace, Joy of all who sorrow!".

Many Orthodox parishes are named Joy of All Who Sorrow and specific commemoration of the Joy of All Who Sorrow is on July 23, on Orthodox calendars. The icon can be found in the Transfiguration Cathedral on Bolshaya Ordynka Street in Moscow, one of the few churches that remained open during Soviet rule.
