= The Church of St. Alexis in Rogozhskaya Sloboda =

- Храм Святителя Алексия в Рогожской слободе
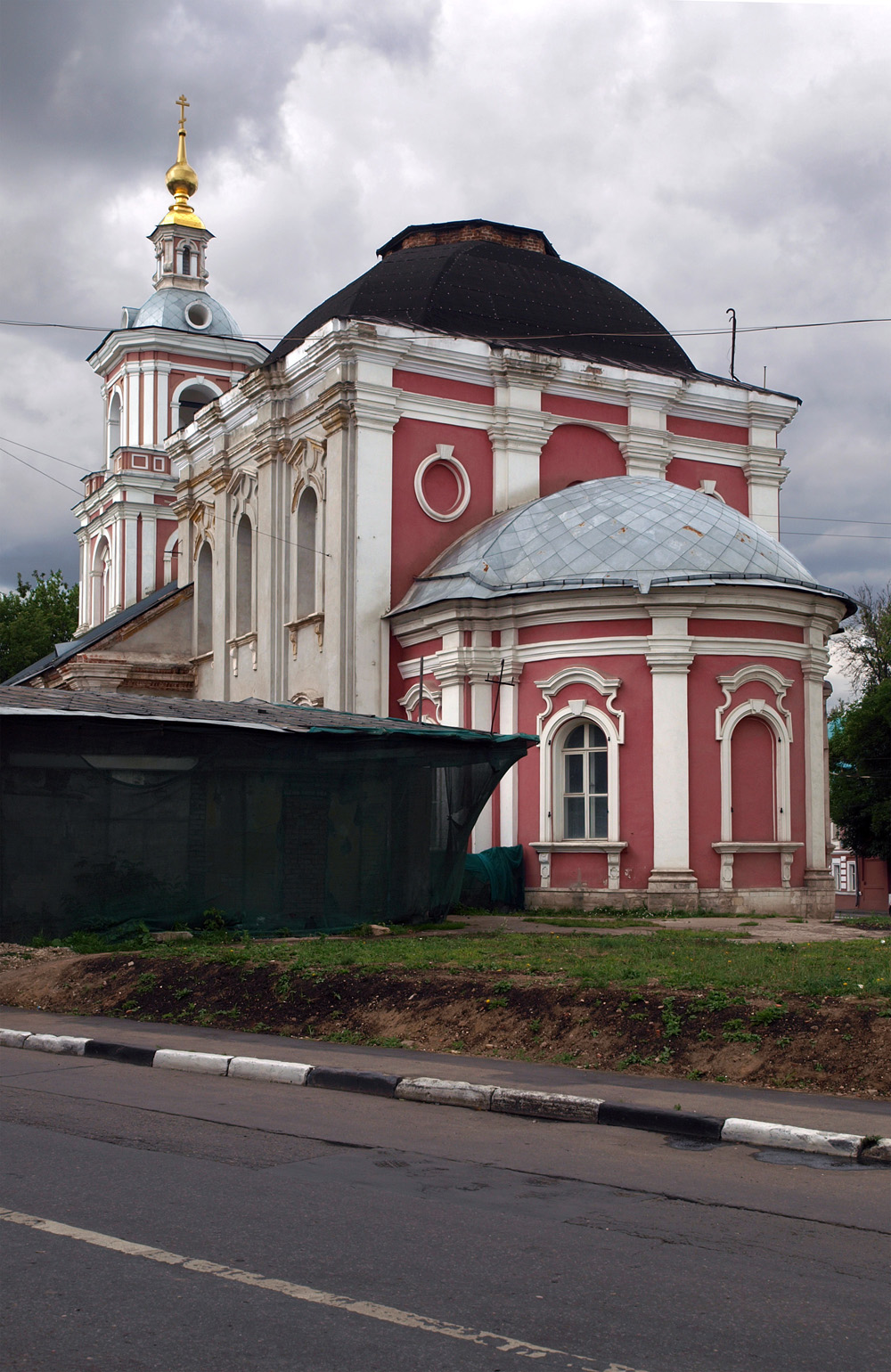
- Interactive map of The Church of St. Alexis in Rogozhskaya Sloboda
- Location: Moscow, Stanislavsky, Building 29, Building 1

The Church of St. Alexis in Rogozhskaya Sloboda (Russian: Храм Святителя Алексия в Рогожской слободе) is an orthodox church of the Moscow City diocese. The church was built in 1748-1751 in the Rogozhskaya Sloboda in the style of Elizabethan Baroque. It has the status of an object of cultural heritage of federal significance. It is located at: St. Stanislavsky, Building 29, Building 1 (Nikoloyamskaya St., Building 60). Attached to the church is the St. Sergius of Radonezh in Rogozhskaya Sloboda.

== History ==
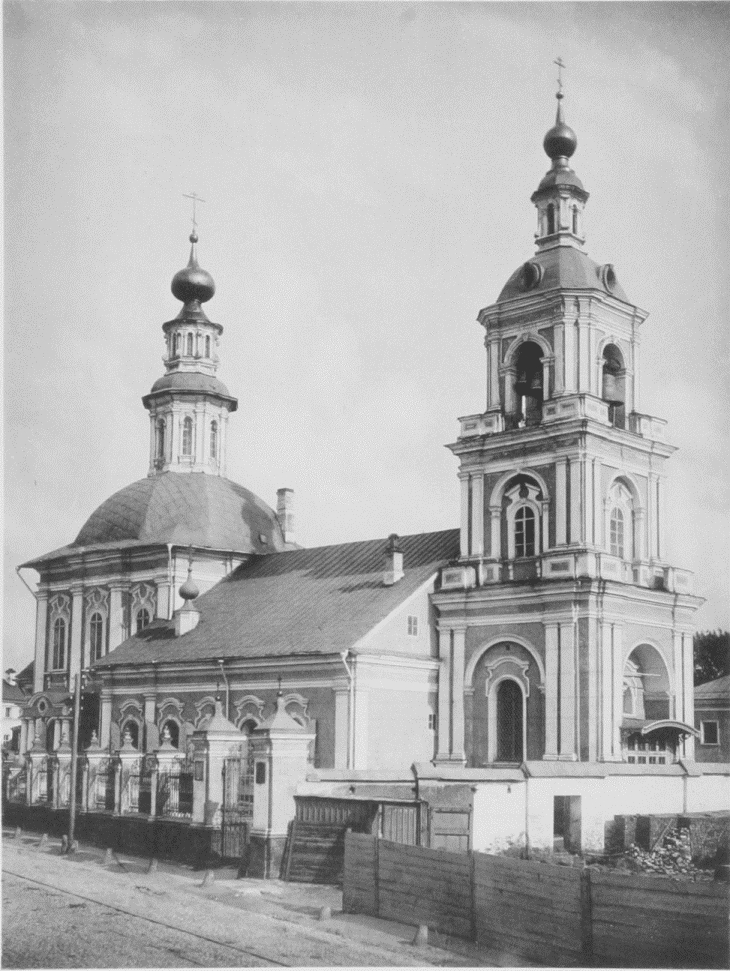
The church in 1883

It is known that on the site of the present temple in the Rogozhskaya Sloboda there was a wooden church, which was first mentioned in 1625 and was presumably built not long before. A chapel of St. Nicholas was built in the wooden church in 1696. The wooden building was replaced with a brick church in 1701. The current building was built by the residents of the settlement in 1748-1751. The main throne was consecrated in honor of the icon of the Theodore of Our Lady, while lateral chapels were consecrated in the name of Alexy the Metropolitan and Nicholas the Miracle-Worker. The authorship of the project is attributed to the architect D. V. Ukhtomsky. In 1778-1779 the walls of the building were painted. In the second half of the 19th century, the church operated an almshouse for ten parishioners.

According to information at the beginning of the 20th century, the baroque iconostasis of 1751 and the wall murals of 1778 were preserved in the church. There were two icons of the 16th century: the Nativity of Christ and a Deesis of a large size.

In 1922, two golden spools were seized from the temple, as well as 17 poods of 15 pounds, 69 silver spools, 75 pearl gold pearls. The church remained active for some time. According to the recollections of the old residents, it was closed in 1930. Since 1966, a factory has operated in the temple for the processing of special alloys, and repair and construction management since 1984. In 1990, the building was occupied by the warehouse of the district repair and construction department. As of that period, the upper part of the bell tower was demolished. The drum, the head and cross of the main temple, and part of the fence were dismantled. A number of extensions were made to the building.

In the early 1990s, the church was returned to the Orthodox Church and restoration work began. In 2012, the completion of the main temple was restored.

== Architecture ==
The architecture of the church refers to the mature Elizabethan Baroque. To the quadrangle from the east, there is a semicircular apse. In the west, there is a two-line refectory with a three-tiered bell tower. The walls are evenly dissected by pilasters and completed with wide cornices. Wide arched windows are decorated with figured platbands. The windows of the second floor of the quadrangle are crowned with endings in the form of torn pediments.

The church is located on the "arrow" intersecting at an acute angle of the streets of Nikoloyamskaya and Stanislavsky (the former Bolshaya and Malaya Alekseevsky). Previously, it completed the prospect of the ancient Vladimir tract. At the entrance to Moscow the church of St. Alexis was perceived as part of an architectural ensemble, standing almost opposite the church of Sergius of Radonezh.

== Literature ==
- "Церковь Митрополита Алексия в Рогожской слободе". Москва: Энциклопедия (100 000 экз ed.). Большая российская энциклопедия. 1997. ISBN 978-5-85270-277-7 – via Глав. ред. С. О. Шмидт; Сост.: М. И. Андреев, В. М. Карев.

== Links ==
- Official site
