= St Bede's Church, Rotherham =

St Bede's Church
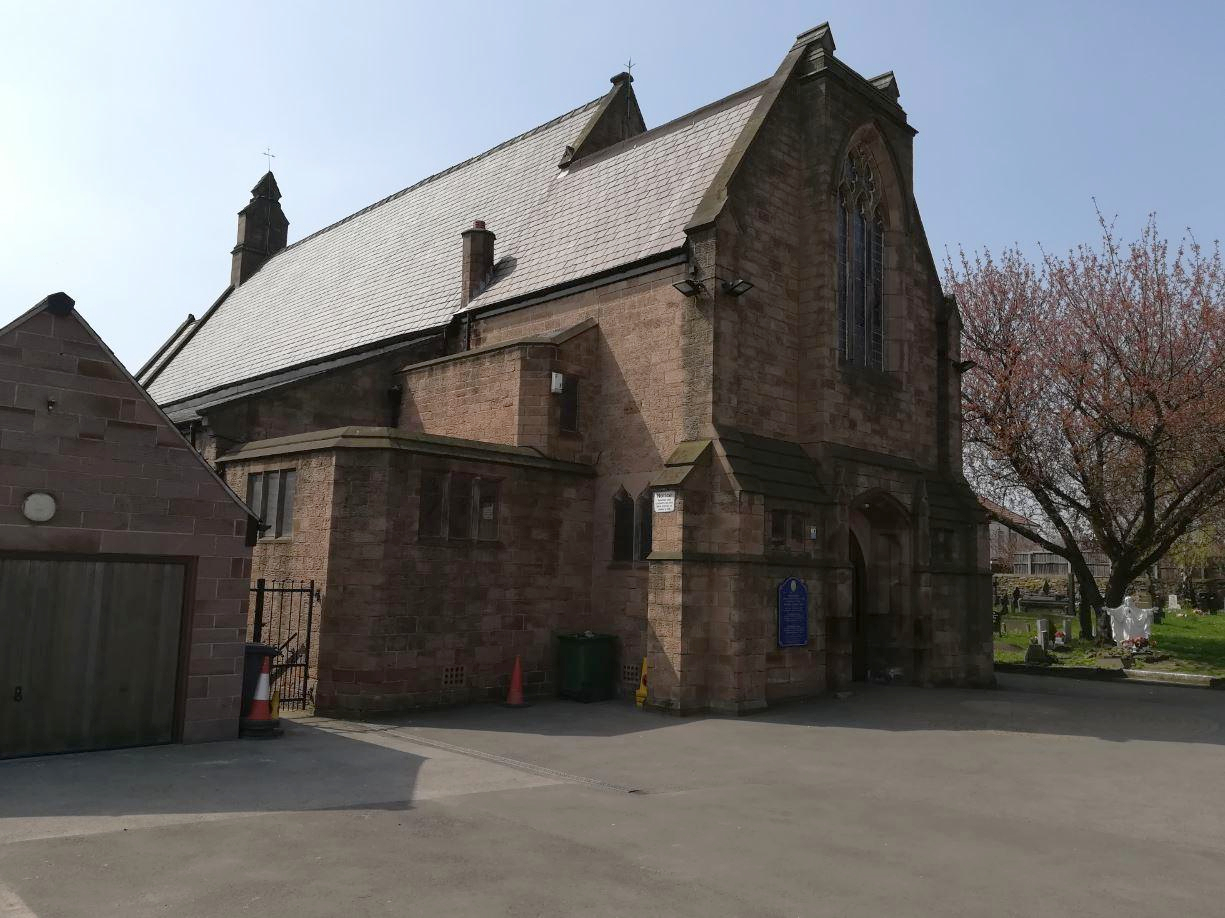
- St Bede's Church
- 53.429845°N 1.367910°W
- OS grid reference: SK 42103 92766
- Location: Rotherham
- Country: England
- Denomination: Roman Catholic
- Website: StBedesParishChurchRotherham.co.uk

History
- Status: Parish church
- Dedication: Bede

Architecture
- Functional status: Active
- Architect: Weightman and Hadfield
- Groundbreaking: 29 July 1841
- Completed: 5 October 1842
- Construction cost: £1,200

Administration
- Province: Liverpool
- Diocese: Hallam
- Deanery: Rotherham

St Bede's Church is a Roman Catholic parish church in Rotherham, South Yorkshire, England. The Gothic Revival style church, designed by Weightman and Hadfield, is situated on the corner of Station Road and St Bede's Road in Masbrough near the town centre. Built from 1841 to 1842, it was opened eight years before the Restoration of the English hierarchy in 1850.

== History ==
=== Foundation ===
The church was built on a piece of land donated to the local Catholic congregation by Benjamin Badger. In 1842, in The London and Dublin Orthodox Journal, he was reported as saying, "Although a member of the Church of England, you know from long acquaintance that I am no bigot. As therefore you mention the great want of a place of worship for the poor Catholics of this place and their inability to purchase land ... I will give you 1,000 yards of the front land you think so eligible, and worth to me from £300 to £400, to present to your friends on condition that the chapel erected thereon be a respectable building so as not to deteriorate the land adjoining."

=== Construction ===
On 29 July 1841, the foundation stone was laid by Benjamin Badger. The architects were Matthew Ellison Hadfield and John Grey Weightman. They also designed St Bede's Church in Widnes and Church of St Mary of the Assumption in Burnley. On 5 October 1842, it was opened and dedicated by the Apostolic Vicar of the Yorkshire District, John Briggs. In the 1930s, a choir loft was added to the church.

== Parish ==
Also in the parish of St Bede's is Forty Martyrs Church in Kimberworth, Rotherham.

St Bede's Church has three Sunday Masses: 9:30am, 11:15am (in Polish) and 6:15pm. Forty Martyrs Church has a Sunday Mass at 5:00pm on Saturday afternoon.
