= Donskoy District =

Donskoy District Донской район (Russian)
- District
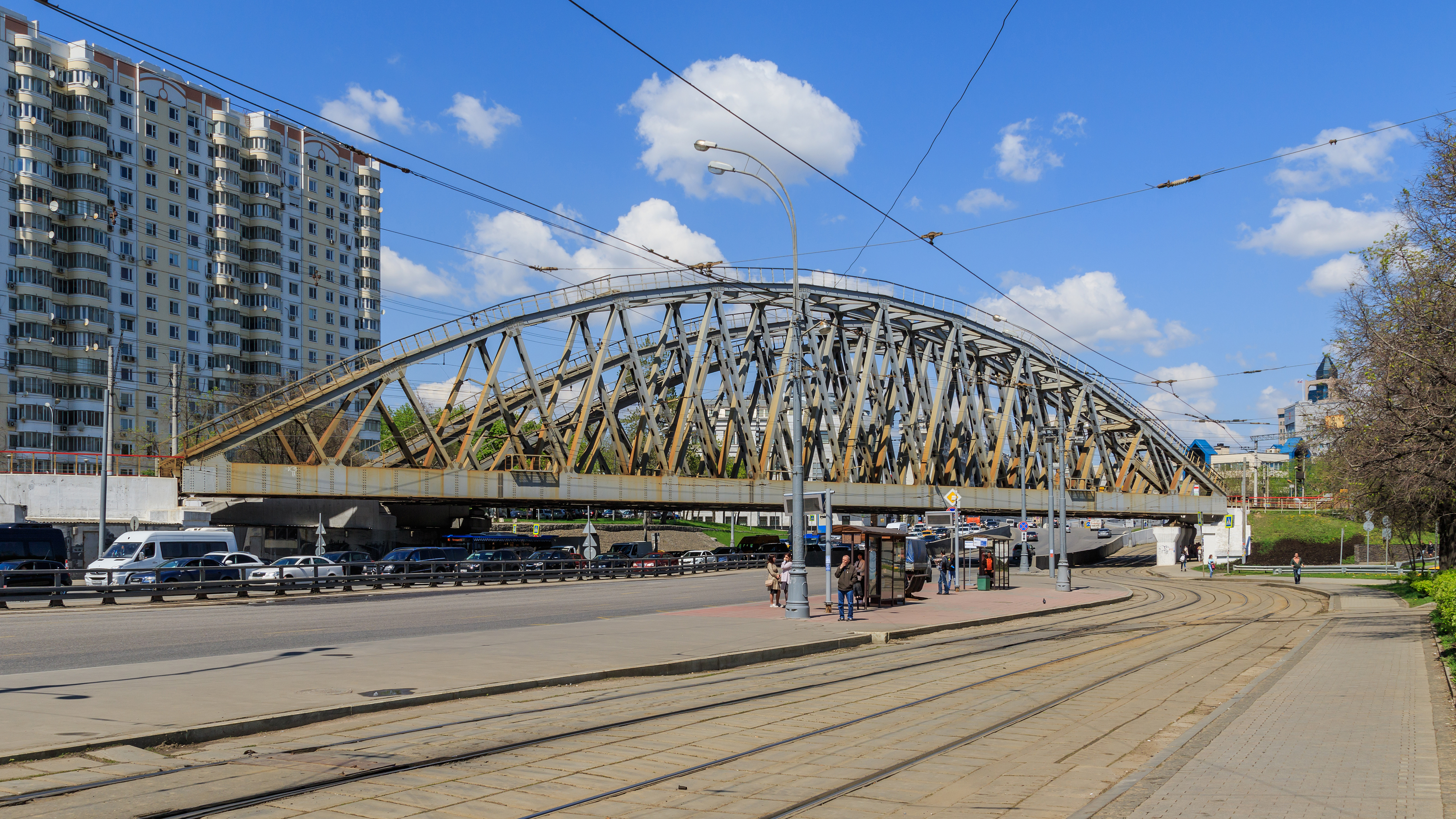
- Railway overpass over Bolshaya Tulskaya Street entering Varshavskoye Highway, Donskoy District

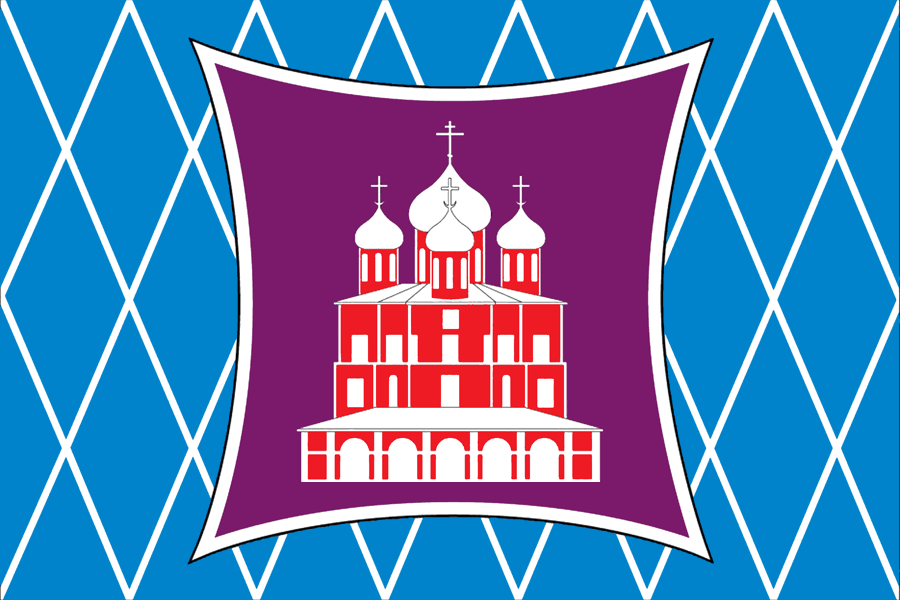
- Flag Coat of arms
- Location of Donskoy District on the map of Moscow
- Coordinates: 55°42′00″N 37°36′00″E
- Country: Russia
- Federal subject: Moscow

Area
  - Total: 5.895 km^{2} (2.276 sq mi)

Population
  - Estimate (2017): 52,000
- Time zone: UTC+
- OKTMO ID: 45915000
- Website: https://donskoy.mos.ru/

Donskoy District (Russian: Донско́й райо́н) is an administrative district (raion) of Southern Administrative Okrug, and one of the 125 raions of Moscow, Russia. The area of the district is 5.895 square kilometers (2.276 sq mi). Population: 52,000 (2017 est.)

== See also ==
- Administrative divisions of Moscow
