= Danilovsky District, Moscow =

Danilovsky District, Moscow Даниловский район (Russian)
- District
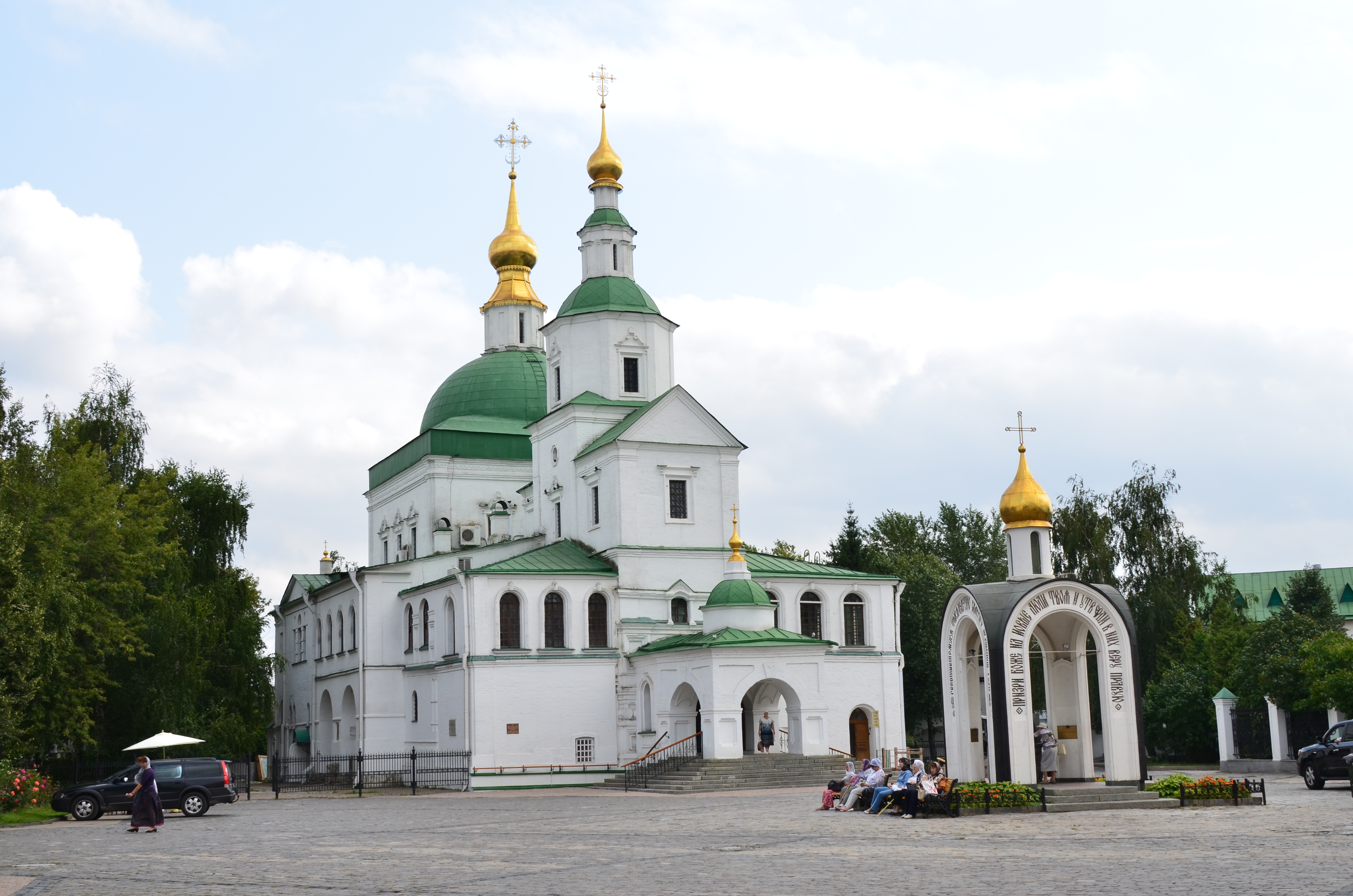
- Danilov Monastery, Danilovsky District

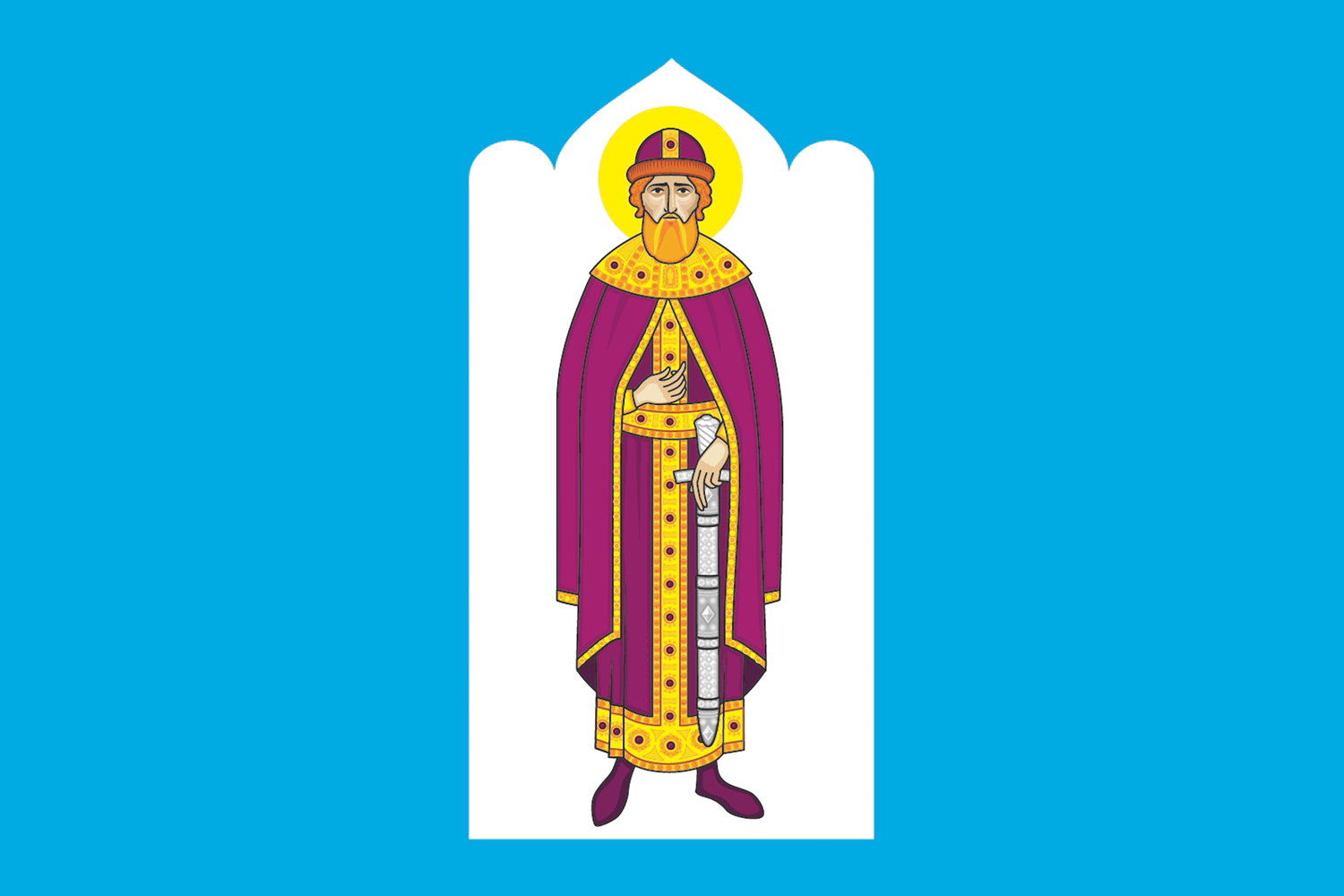
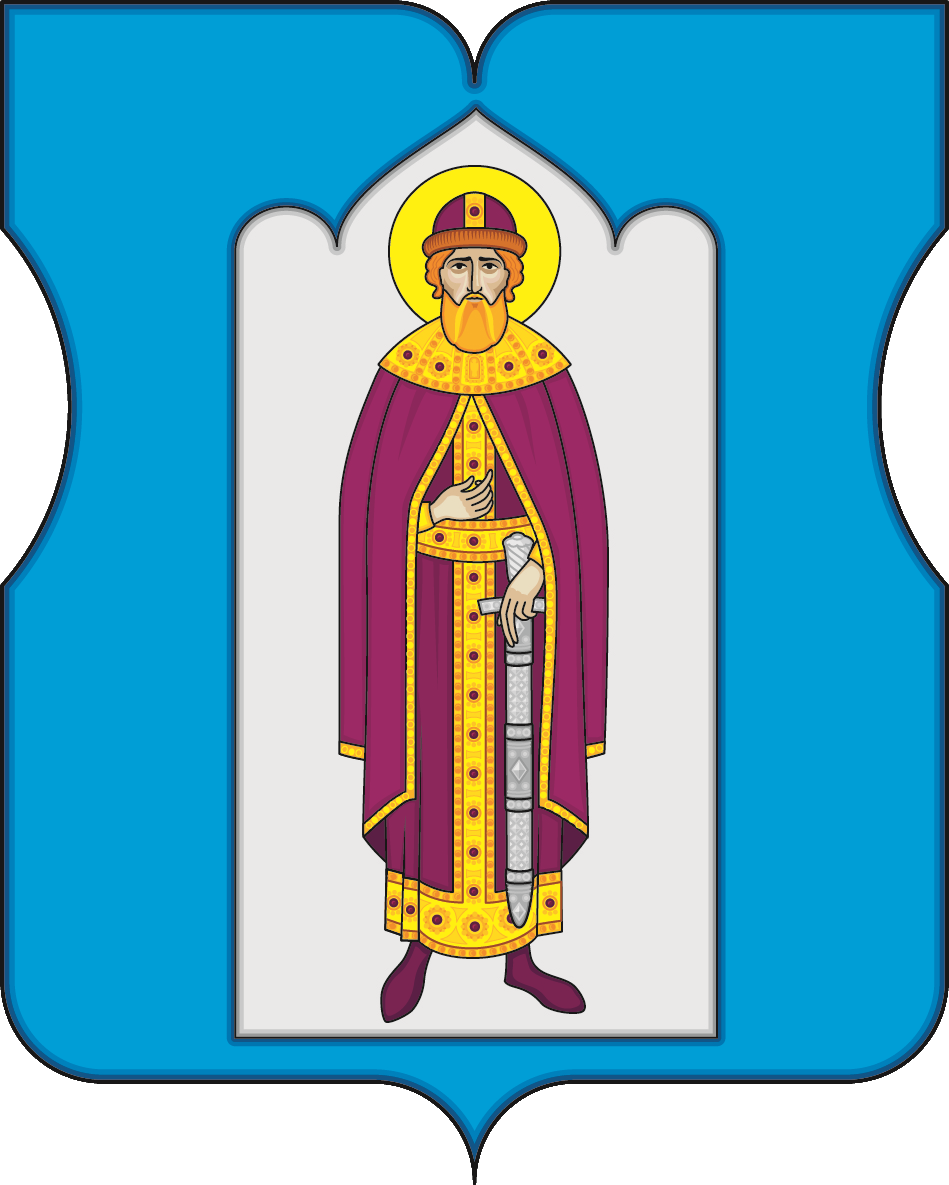
- Flag Coat of arms
- Location of Danilovsky District, Moscow on the map of Moscow
- Coordinates: 55°42′00″N 37°39′00″E
- Country: Russia
- Federal subject: Moscow
- Time zone: UTC+
- OKTMO ID: 45914000
- Website: https://danilovsky.mos.ru/

Danilovsky District, Moscow (Russian: Дани́ловский райо́н) is an administrative district (raion) of Southern Administrative Okrug, and one of the 125 raions of Moscow, Russia. The area of the district is 12.60 square kilometers (4.86 sq mi).

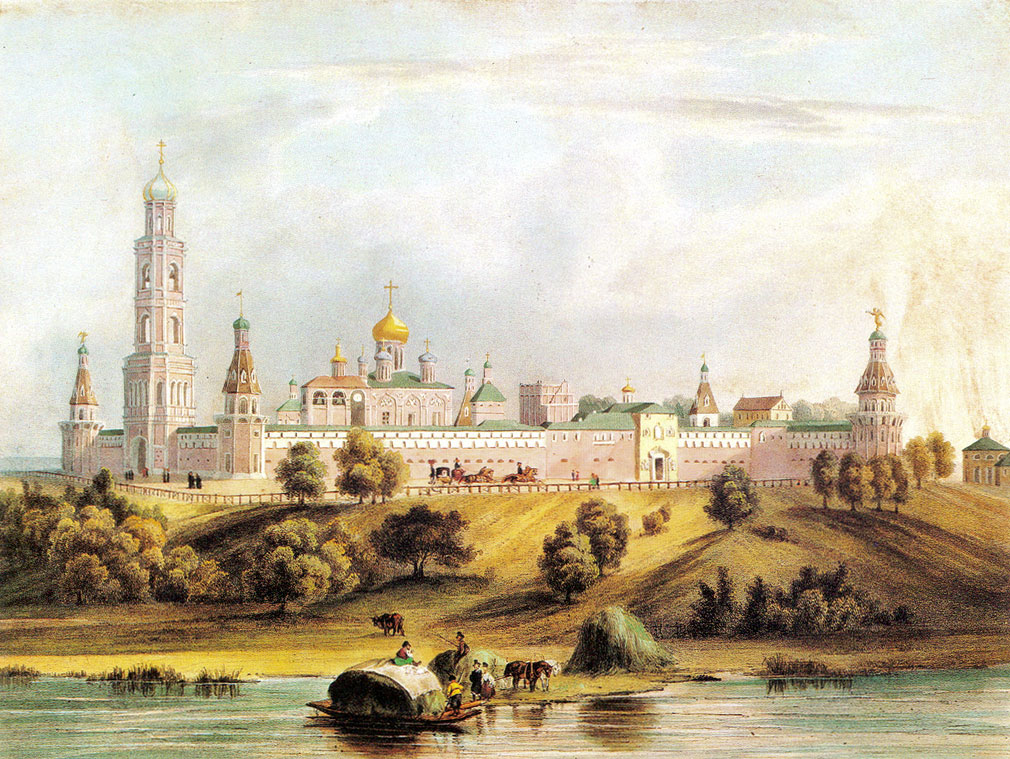
Simonov Monastery

== History ==
=== District Formation ===
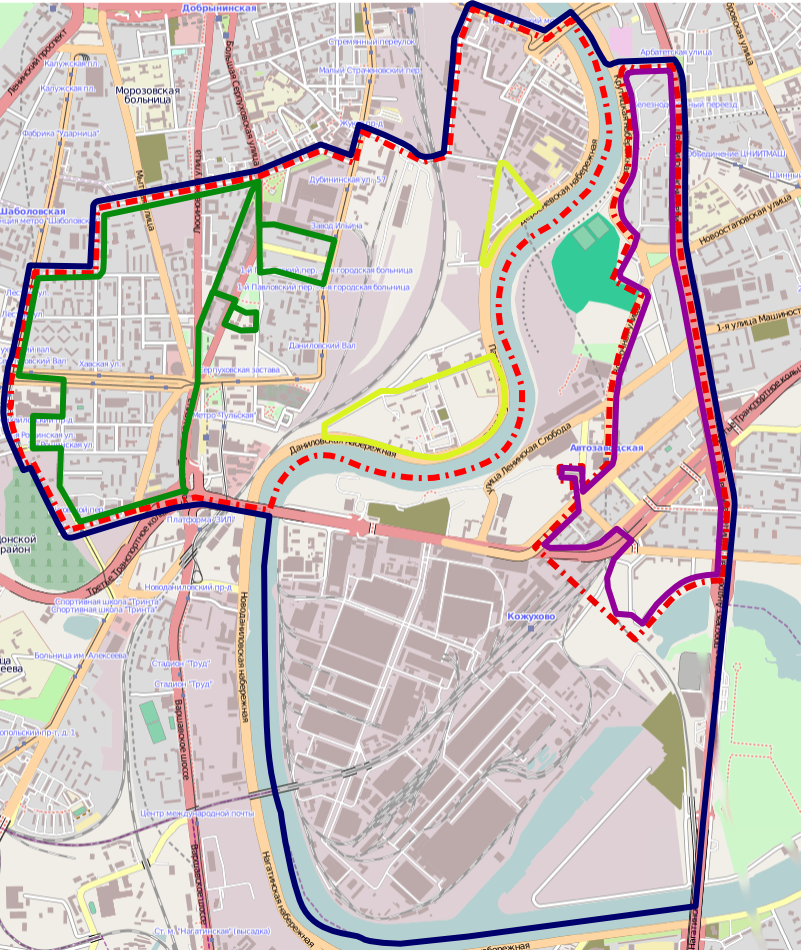
Boundaries of municipal districts in 1991: green—Danilovsky, yellow—Paveletsky, purple—Simonovsky. 1995: red—the territory of the Danilovsky municipal district after the annexation of Paveletsky and Simonovsky. Since 2002: blue—current boundaries of the Danilovsky district.

Until 1991, the territory of the present-day Danilovsky District was part of the Proletarsky and Moskvoretsky districts of Moscow. In 1991, an administrative reform was carried out in Moscow, during which administrative and municipal districts were established. As a result, the temporary municipal districts of Simonovsky, Paveletsky, Danilovsky were organized within the Southern Administrative District of Moscow.

== See also ==
- Administrative divisions of Moscow
