= Stupino (inhabited locality) =

Stupino (Russian: Ступино) is the name of several inhabited localities in Russia.

== Arkhangelsk Oblast ==
As of 2010, one rural locality in Arkhangelsk Oblast bears this name:

- Stupino, Arkhangelsk Oblast, a village in Kopachevsky Selsoviet of Kholmogorsky District

== Astrakhan Oblast ==
As of 2010, one rural locality in Astrakhan Oblast bears this name:

- Stupino, Astrakhan Oblast, a selo in Stupino Selsoviet of Chernoyarsky District

== Chelyabinsk Oblast ==
As of 2010, one rural locality in Chelyabinsk Oblast bears this name:

- Stupino, Chelyabinsk Oblast, a village in Sarafanovsky Selsoviet of Chebarkulsky District

== Ivanovo Oblast ==
As of 2010, two rural localities in Ivanovo Oblast bear this name:

- Stupino, Furmanovsky District, Ivanovo Oblast, a village in Furmanovsky District
- Stupino, Savinsky District, Ivanovo Oblast, a village in Savinsky District

== Kaluga Oblast ==
As of 2010, one rural locality in Kaluga Oblast bears this name:

- Stupino, Kaluga Oblast, a village in Medynsky District

== Kostroma Oblast ==
As of 2010, two rural localities in Kostroma Oblast bear this name:

- Stupino, Galichsky District, Kostroma Oblast, a village in Berezovskoye Settlement of Galichsky District
- Stupino, Manturovsky District, Kostroma Oblast, a village in Ugorskoye Settlement of Manturovsky District

== Lipetsk Oblast ==
As of 2010, one rural locality in Lipetsk Oblast bears this name:

- Stupino, Lipetsk Oblast, a village in Speshnevo-Ivanovsky Selsoviet of Dankovsky District

== Moscow Oblast ==
As of 2010, four inhabited localities in Moscow Oblast bear this name.

Urban localities

- Stupino, Stupinsky District, Moscow Oblast, a town in Stupinsky District

Rural localities

- Stupino, Domodedovo, Moscow Oblast, a village under the administrative jurisdiction of the Domodedovo Town Under Oblast Jurisdiction
- Stupino, Dmitrovsky District, Moscow Oblast, a village in Kulikovskoye Rural Settlement of Dmitrovsky District
- Stupino, Naro-Fominsky District, Moscow Oblast, a village in Volchenkovskoye Rural Settlement of Naro-Fominsky District

== Nizhny Novgorod Oblast ==
As of 2010, two rural localities in Nizhny Novgorod Oblast bear this name:

- Stupino, Chkalovsky District, Nizhny Novgorod Oblast, a village in Kuznetsovsky Selsoviet of Chkalovsky District
- Stupino, Gorodetsky District, Nizhny Novgorod Oblast, a village in Zinyakovsky Selsoviet of Gorodetsky District

== Pskov Oblast ==
As of 2010, five rural localities in Pskov Oblast bear this name:

- Stupino, Kunyinsky District, Pskov Oblast, a village in Kunyinsky District
- Stupino, Novorzhevsky District, Pskov Oblast, a village in Novorzhevsky District
- Stupino, Opochetsky District, Pskov Oblast, a village in Opochetsky District
- Stupino, Ostrovsky District, Pskov Oblast, a village in Ostrovsky District
- Stupino, Pechorsky District, Pskov Oblast, a village in Pechorsky District

== Tula Oblast ==
As of 2010, two rural localities in Tula Oblast bear this name:

- Stupino, Aleksinsky District, Tula Oblast, a village in Spas-Koninsky Rural Okrug of Aleksinsky District
- Stupino, Yefremovsky District, Tula Oblast, a selo in Stupinsky Rural Okrug of Yefremovsky District

== Tver Oblast ==
As of 2010, two rural localities in Tver Oblast bear this name:

- Stupino, Selizharovsky District, Tver Oblast, a village in Selizharovsky District
- Stupino, Zubtsovsky District, Tver Oblast, a village in Zubtsovsky District

== Vladimir Oblast ==
As of 2010, one rural locality in Vladimir Oblast bears this name:

- Stupino, Vladimir Oblast, a village in Kameshkovsky District

== Vologda Oblast ==
As of 2010, two rural localities in Vologda Oblast bear this name:

- Stupino, Abakanovsky Selsoviet, Cherepovetsky District, Vologda Oblast, a village in Abakanovsky Selsoviet of Cherepovetsky District
- Stupino, Bolshedvorsky Selsoviet, Cherepovetsky District, Vologda Oblast, a village in Bolshedvorsky Selsoviet of Cherepovetsky District

== Voronezh Oblast ==
As of 2010, two rural localities in Voronezh Oblast bear this name:

- Stupino, Pavlovsky District, Voronezh Oblast, a khutor in Pokrovskoye Rural Settlement of Pavlovsky District
- Stupino, Ramonsky District, Voronezh Oblast, a selo in Stupinskoye Rural Settlement of Ramonsky District

== Yaroslavl Oblast ==
As of 2010, two rural localities in Yaroslavl Oblast bear this name:

- Stupino, Bolsheselsky District, Yaroslavl Oblast, a village in Blagoveshchensky Rural Okrug of Bolsheselsky District
- Stupino, Myshkinsky District, Yaroslavl Oblast, a village in Arkhangelsky Rural Okrug of Myshkinsky District
