= Chertanovo railway station =

Railway station in Moscow, Russia

Chertanovo Чертаново
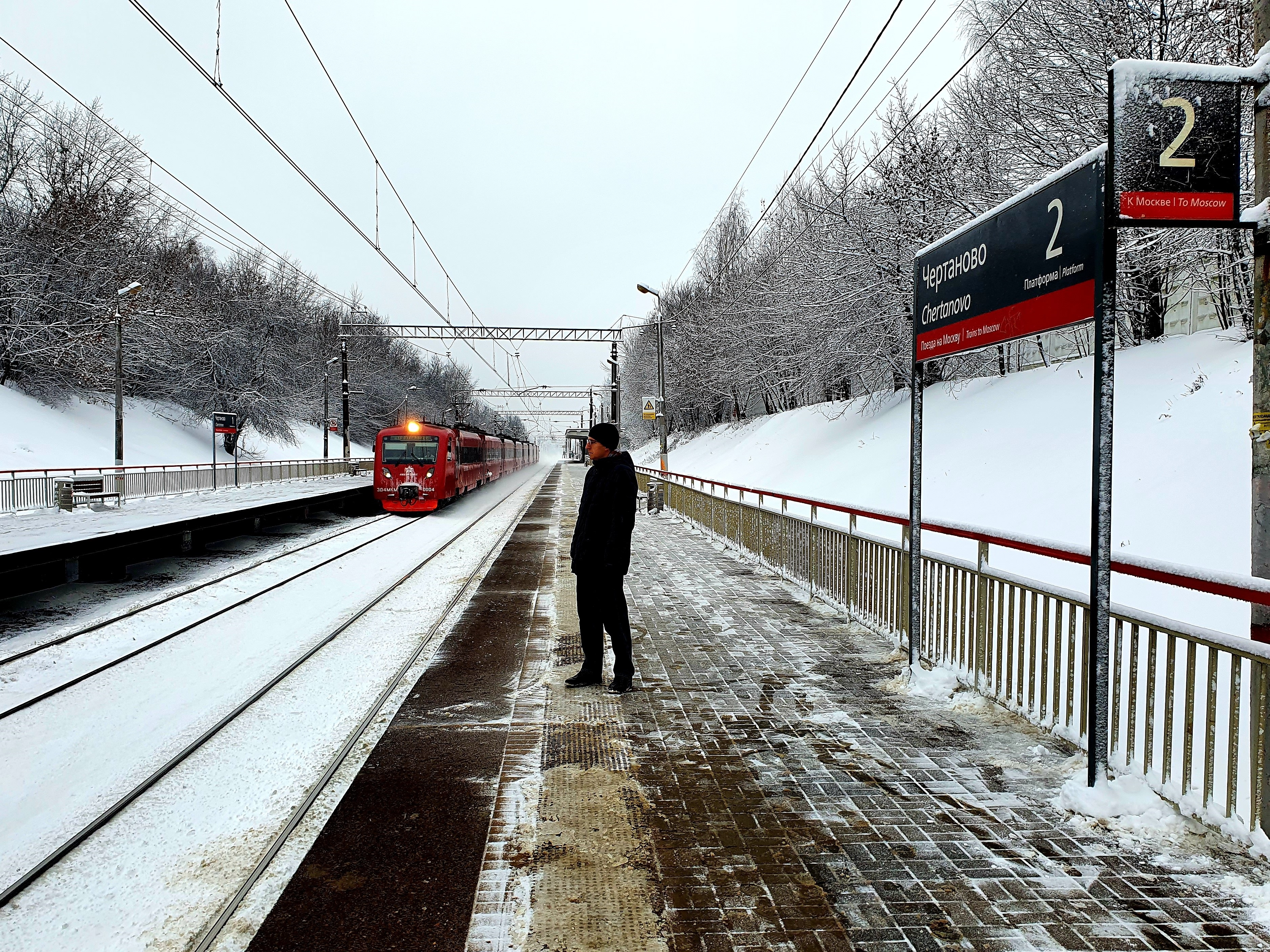
- Chertanovo Rail Station in January 2020, with an Aeroexpress train to Domodedovo Airport passing by

General information
- Location: Moscow; Russia
- Coordinates: 55.631370°N 37.62732°E
- System: Moscow Railway station
- Owner: Russian Railways
- Line: Paveletsky Suburban Line
- Platforms: 2 side platforms
- Tracks: 2
- Connections: Bus: 150, 182

Other information
- Station code: 193203
- Fare zone: 0

History
- Opened: 1936

Services
Preceding station	Russian Railways	Following station
Kolomenskoye towards Moscow Paveletsky	Paveletsky Suburban	Biryulyovo-Tovarnaya towards Uzunovo
Location
- Location within Moscow Ring Road

Chertanovo (Russian: Чертаново) is a railway station (or more precisely, platform, following the Russian railway stops classification) of the Paveletsky suburban railway line in the southern part of Moscow. It was opened in 1936 and named after a nearby village, which is now a residential area in the Southern Administrative Okrug of the city.

The station has two side platforms, connected by a pedestrian level crossing. There is a waiting shelter on the Moscow-bound platform.
