= Stupino =

Stupino may refer to:

- Stupino Urban Settlement, a municipal formation which the town of Stupino, Stupinsky District, Moscow Oblast, Russia is incorporated as
- Stupino (inhabited locality), several inhabited localities in Russia
- Stupino Airfield, an airport and a former air base in Russia

== See also ==
- Stupinsky (disambiguation)
