= Biryulyovo-Tovarnaya =

Railway station in Moscow, Russia

Biryulyovo Tovarnaya Бирюлёво-Товарная
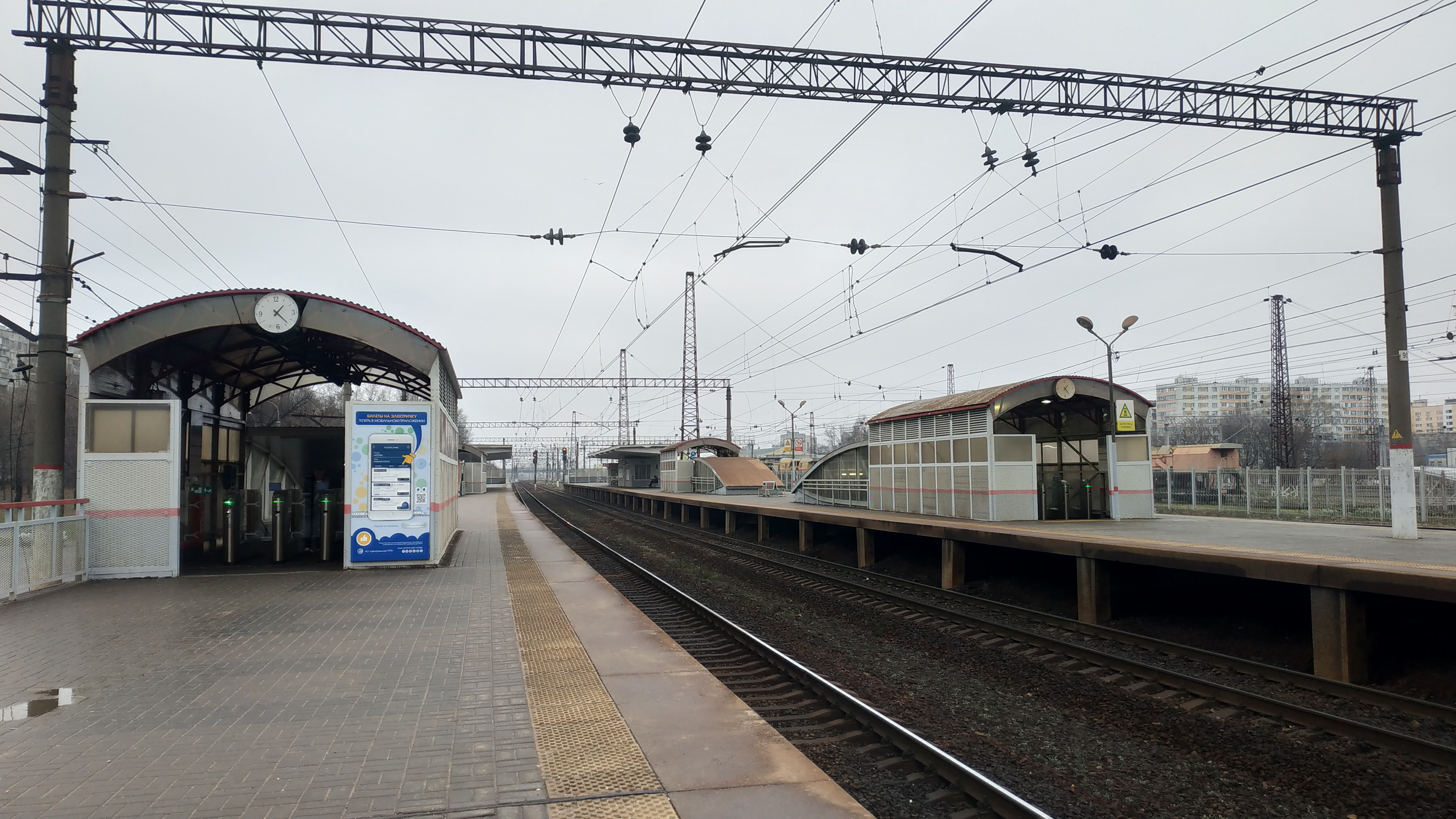
- The passenger platforms of the station

General information
- Location: Biryulyovo Zapadnoye, Biryulyovo Vostochnoye District; Moscow; Russia
- Coordinates: 55°35′34″N 37°39′14″E
- Owner: Russian Railways
- Operator: Moscow Railway
- Platforms: 2
- Tracks: 2

Construction
- Structure type: At-grade

Other information
- Station code: 193307

History
- Opened: 1900
- Electrified: 1953
- Former names: Zagorye, Biryulyovo

Services
Preceding station	Russian Railways	Following station
Chertanovo towards Moscow Paveletsky	Paveletsky Suburban	Biryulyovo Passazhirskaya towards Uzunovo
Proposed
Preceding station	Moscow Central Diameters	Following station
Kotlyakovo towards Pushkino	Line D5	Biryulyovo-Passazhirskoye towards Domodedovo
Location

Biryulyovo Tovarnaya (Russian: Бирюлёво-Товарная, Biryulyovo Cargo Station) is a railway station located in Biryulyovo Zapadnoye and Biryulyovo Vostochnoye Districts of Moscow, Russia. The station serves suburban traffic of Paveletsky suburban railway line. The northbound trains terminate at Moscow Paveletsky railway station in Moscow. The southbound trains terminate at the stations of Biryulyovo Passazhirskaya, Domodedovo, Barybino, Mikhnevo, Stupino, Kashira, Ozherelye, and Uzunovo. The station is operated by the Moscow Railway.

The next station in the northern direction is Chertanovo, and the next one in the southern direction is Biryulyovo-Passazhirskaya. There is a connecting railway track which runs north and crosses to the Kursky suburban railway line; there is no passenger traffic along this track.

Biryulyovo-Tovarnaya has access to Medynskaya Street and Bulatnikovsky Lane (west), as well as to Kasimovskaya Street (east). The public bus traffic is organized. The station is surrounded by a residential area.

The station was opened in 1900 when the railway connecting Moscow and Pavelets was built to connect Moscow to Ryazan-Ural Railway. Initially, the station was named Zagorye after the name of the closest village. Until September 1900, Paveletsky railway station in Moscow was not yet completed, and the trains from the station of Zagorye followed to the Kursky railway station. Subsequently, the station was renamed Biryulyovo according to another village, located further away, and the name was transferred to the settlement which was built to serve the station. In the 1910s, the station of Biryulyovo was separated into a cargo station (Biryulyovo-Tovarnaya) and a passenger station (Biryulyovo-Passazhirskaya). Eventually, in 1936 a passenger platform was built on Biryulyovo-Tovarnaya as well, while the cargo station continued to operate. In 1953, the railway stretch between Moscow and Domodedovo, including Biryulyovo Tovarnaya, was electrified. In 1960, the station, together with the urban-type settlement of Biryulyovo, was included into Moscow.
