= Sergey Goryachev =

Russian major general (1970–2023)

Sergey Vladimirovich Goryachev
- Сергей Владимирович Горячев
- Goryachev in 2021
- Born: 22 October 1970; Ozherelye, Russian SFSR, Soviet Union (present-day Russia)
- Died: 12 June 2023 (aged 52); Near Volnovakha, Zaporizhzhia Oblast, Ukraine
- Military career
- Allegiance: Russian Federation
- Branch: Ground Forces
- Service years: 1994–2023
- Rank: Major general
- Engagements: Second Chechen War; Russo-Ukrainian War; Russian invasion of Ukraine; 2023 Ukrainian counteroffensive †

Sergey Vladimirovich Goryachev (Russian: Сергей Владимирович Горячев; 22 October 1970 – 12 June 2023) was a Russian military officer. He served as commander of the Russian 201st Military Base in Tajikistan and as chief of staff of the 35th Combined Arms Army in Belogorsk. In 2022, he was reassigned from Tajikistan to serve in the Russian invasion of Ukraine, and was later killed during the 2023 Ukrainian counteroffensive.

== Biography ==
Sergei Goryachev was born on 22 October 1970, in the city of Ozherelye in Moscow Oblast in the Soviet Union. In 1994, he graduated from the Ryazan Guards Higher Airborne Command School and graduated from the Combined Arms Academy of the Armed Forces of the Russian Federation in 2008.

Originally the commander of a reconnaissance platoon, Goryachev subsequently served as an assistant chief of reconnaissance of a regiment and later served as deputy commander of a reconnaissance company, a reconnaissance company commander and a parachute battalion commander. From 2011 to 2013, he was deputy commander of a separate motorized rifle brigade of the combined arms army of the Western Military District, one of Russia's operational commands. In March 2013, he was appointed head of the Operational Group of Russian Forces in Transnistria. Since 14 November 2018 (met personnel on 21 November 2018), he was made commander of the Russian 201st Military Base in Tajikistan, awarding the tankers of the 201st Russian military base with departmental medals.

In 2022, Goryachev was replaced as the 201st Base by Colonel Evgeny Kovylin and served in the Russian invasion of Ukraine. Over the course of the invasion and subsequent war, Goryachev was the commander of the 5th Separate Tank Brigade, and was promoted to Army Chief of Staff. A posting on the Telegram messaging service reported that Goryachev and several other senior officers had been killed on 12 June 2023 in an attack, reportedly by a Storm Shadow missile launched by the Armed Forces of Ukraine on positions of the Russian Armed Forces in Ukraine's Zaporizhzhia Oblast. On 16 June 2023, the United Kingdom Ministry of Defence assessed that reporting on Goryachev's death was almost certainly accurate and that it is possible that he was acting as an Army commander at the time of his death.

== Awards ==
- Order of Courage (Russia)
- Order of Military Merit (Russia)
- Order "For Merit to the Fatherland"

== See also ==
- List of Russian generals killed during the Russian invasion of Ukraine
- Sergio Gor
