= Moscow Paveletsky railway station =

Railway station in Moscow, Russia

Moscow–Paveletsky Москва–Павелецкая
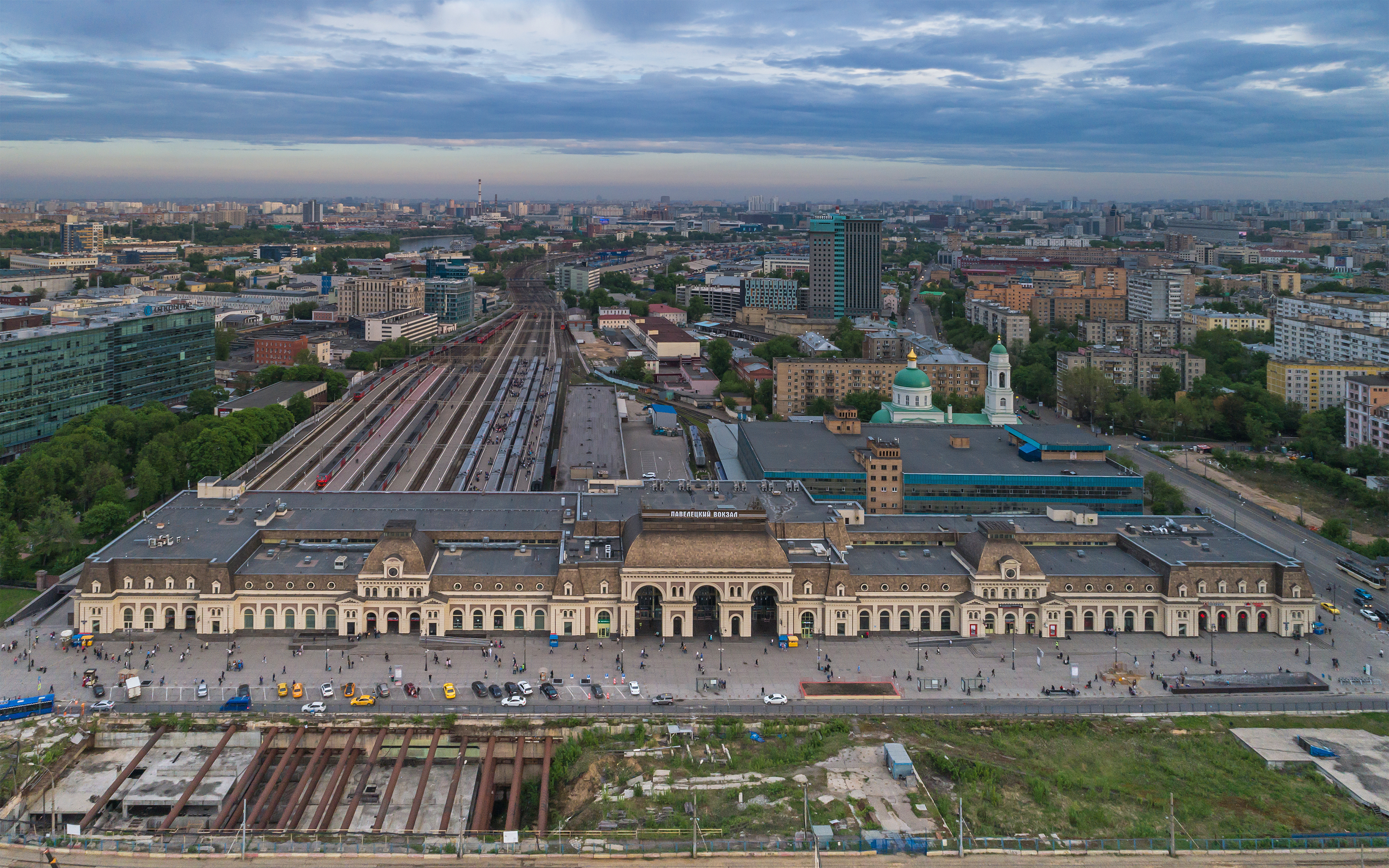
- Aerial view of the station

General information
- Location: Paveletskaya Square, Moscow, Russia
- Coordinates: 55°43′47″N 37°38′22″E
- System: Moscow-Paveletsky
- Operator: Moscow Railway
- Platforms: 10
- Tracks: 12
- Connections: Moscow metro stations: Paveletskaya; Paveletskaya Tram: 3, 35, 38, 39, A; Bus: 3H, 13, 106, 158, 632, Б, K;

Construction
- Structure type: At-grade
- Parking: No

Other information
- Station code: 193519
- Fare zone: 0

History
- Opened: 1900
- Rebuilt: 1980
- Electrified: 1953
- Former names: Saratovsky

Services
Preceding station	Russian Railways	Following station
Terminus	Paveletsky Suburban	Moscow Tovarnaya towards Uzunovo
Preceding station	Aeroexpress	Following station
Terminus	Paveletskaya to Domodedovo	Verkhnie Kotly towards Aeroport Domodedovo
Location

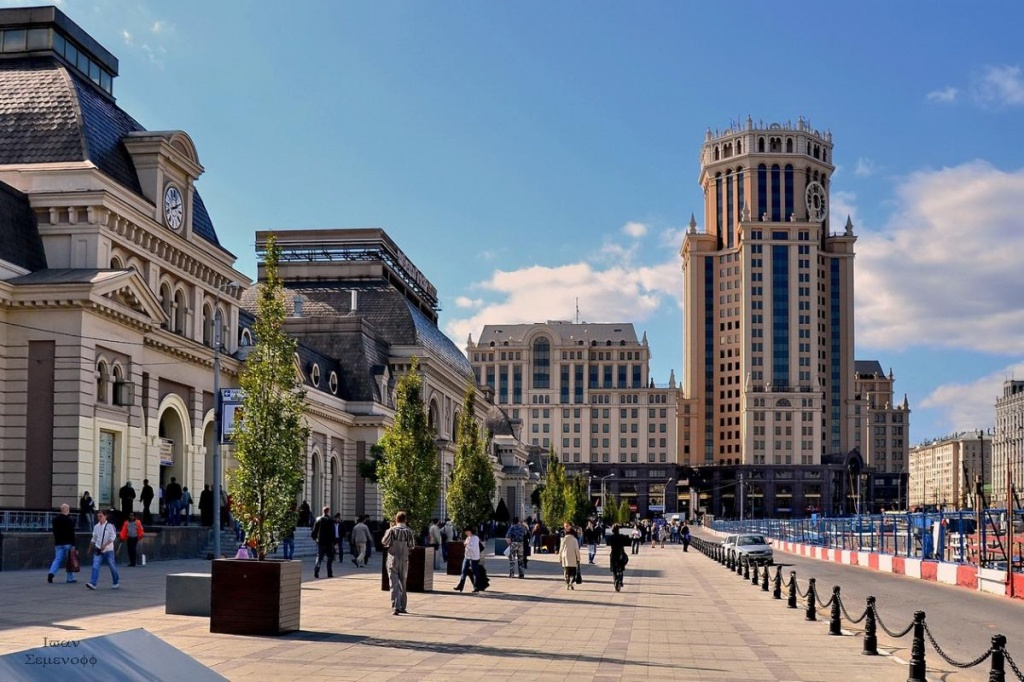
Paveletskaya railway station in Paveletskaya Square

Moscow Paveletsky station (IATA: XRK) (Russian: Павелецкий вокзал) is one of Moscow's ten main railway stations. Originally called Saratovsky Railway Station, it was renamed after the settlement of Pavelets, when the railroad heading southeast from Moscow reached that point in 1899. The station's ornate original building, designed by architect Alexander Krasovsky, was built in 1900 and extensively reconstructed in the 1980s, and remains one of the biggest Moscow railway stations. In 1924, the station served as the place where Muscovites came to meet the body of deceased Lenin. The Lenin Funeral Train is still a permanent exhibit at the Museum of the Moscow Railway. The station is operated by the Moscow Railway.

From Paveletsky station, suburban electric trains depart towards Kashira, Ozherelye, and Uzunovo. Express electric trains depart to Ozherelye and Domodedovo Airport. The major directions of long-distance trains are Almaty, Astrakhan, Baku, Balakovo, Balashov, Lipetsk, Saratov, Tambov, Volgograd, Voronezh, and Yelets.

== History ==
=== Construction ===
In the Russian Empire, the Ryazano–Uralskaya Railway Company controlled the largest private railway, which connected 12 densely populated provinces. However, since it did not have any connection with Moscow, the railway administration applied to the Government for permission to build a new branch between Moscow and Pavelets. The request was granted by Nicholas II in 1897.

The branch was finished 8 1/2 months earlier than scheduled, but lacked a terminal in Moscow.

A new station was designed by architect Alexander Krasovsky and built according to the architectural canons of the time: it was a symmetric building with a heightened center, large windows, and wide and comfortable doorways. There were entrances, a vestibule, luggage space, public waiting rooms, booking-offices, a telegraph, a pharmacy, and a bar at the front. There was a large operation hall in the center which separated rooms for the first- and second-class passengers from the rooms for the third-class passengers.

At the railway side, there were service rooms, gendarmerie rooms, rooms for the tsar, and outlets to the platforms. The railway station was comfortable for its time—it had original heating services and an amphora turret used as a flagstaff.

The station was solidly and reliably constructed as a brick building on a quarrystone foundation. It had two floors (three beneath the domes) and many attics above the flanking buildings. The length of the station building was 83.7 metres (275 ft). External walls were 2 1/2 bricks deep, quite solid for a low building. External walls were revetted with special brick, the socle was revetted with ashlar, and there were stucco mouldings in the vestibule and hall cornices.

The station opened on 1 September 1900, and was known as Saratovsky Railway Station until the 1940s. A thanksgiving service with water consecration took place to mark the station's opening. The chief engineer V.V. Timofeev invited some other chiefs, station personnel, and businessmen—future consignors of goods—to the celebrations. Prior to the opening of the station, the railway between Moscow and Pavelets had been functioning already for several months, during which time trains were rerouted to Kursky railway station.

=== Reconstruction ===
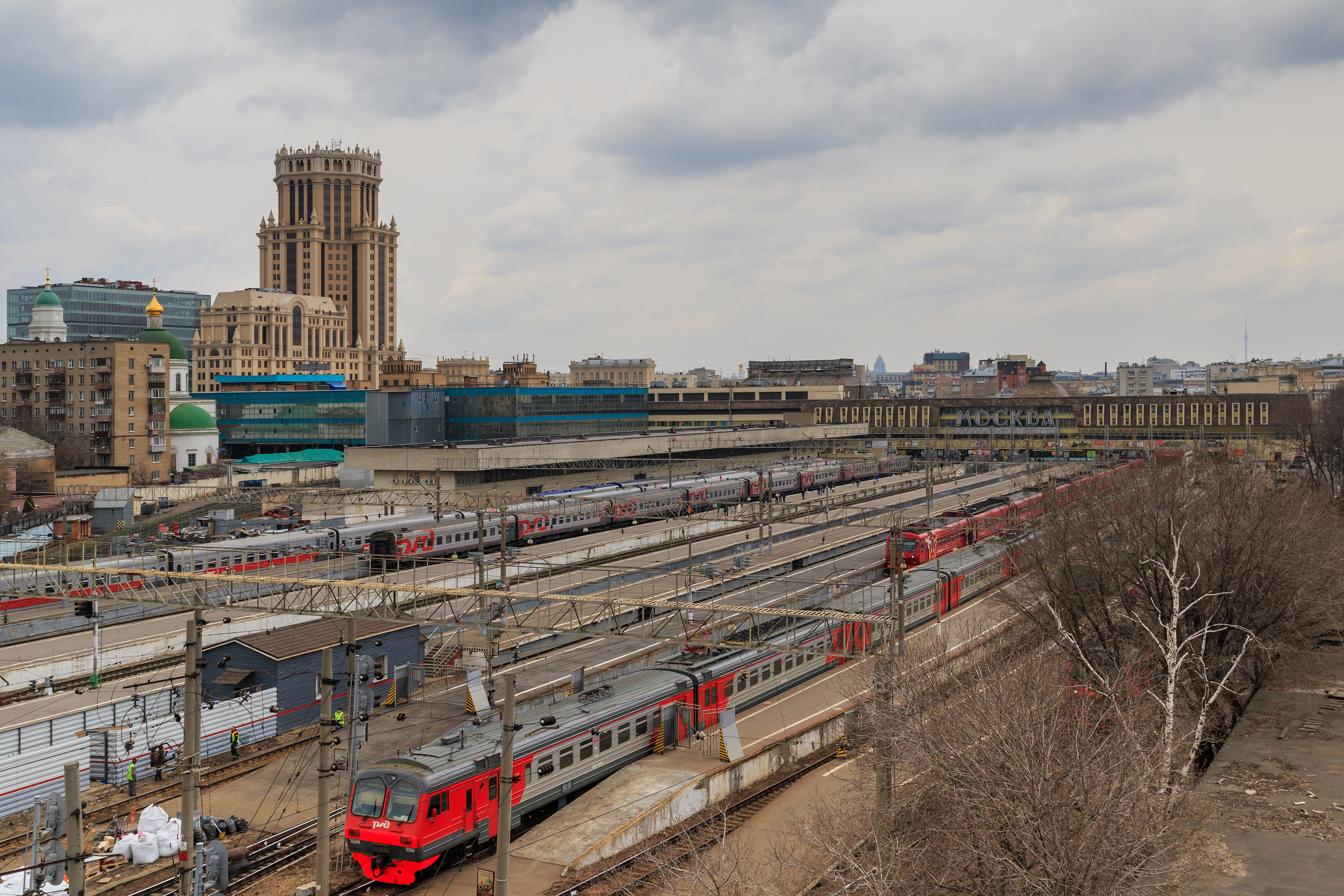
View of the platforms

Saratovsky Railway Station formed part of the ensemble of the city square. When it was decided to reconstruct the station in 1980, the project criteria were very strict. It was necessary to provide up-to-date comfort for passengers while simultaneously retaining the square skyline.

The reconstruction was realized by the Mostransstroy trust. Architects A. Gurkov, S. Kuznetsova, and A. Vorontsov solved the complicated constructive problem, keeping the old station's style. Following reconstruction, the newly renamed Paveletsky station was re-opened on 3 November 1987.

The new station is six times larger by volume and four times larger by carrying capacity than the original. It is now able to receive, serve, and station in its halls about 10,000 people per hour.

From the square, the building seems to have one floor. But in fact there are three levels of passenger rooms, a technical level, and up-to-date service systems inside.

=== The Museum of the Moscow Railway ===
The Museum of the Moscow Railway incorporates the former Museum of Lenin’s Funeral Train, including the locomotive and cars of Lenin's funeral train. The museum also documents the history of the Moscow Railway and has outdoor exhibits at the Moscow Rizhsky railway station.

== Trains and destinations ==
=== Long distance ===
Train number	Train name	Destination	Operated by
001/002	Volgograd (rus: Волгоград)	(Russia) Volgograd	(Russia) Russian Railways
005/006	Lotos (rus: Лотос)	(Russia) Astrakhan	(Russia) Russian Railways
007/008	Kazakhstan (kaz: Қазақстан, rus: Казахстан)	(Kazakhstan) Almaty	(Kazakhstan) Qazaqstan Temir Zholy
009/010	Saratov (rus: Саратов)	(Russia) Saratov	(Russia) Russian Railways
025/026	Voronezh (rus: Воронеж)	(Russia) Voronezh	(Russia) Russian Railways
029/030	Lipetsk (rus: Липецк)	(Russia) Lipetsk (coaches: (Russia) Lev Tolstoy, (Russia) Voronezh)	(Russia) Russian Railways
031/032	Tambov (rus: Тамбов)	(Russia) Tambov	(Russia) Russian Railways
055/056	Azerbaijan (aze: Azərbaycan)	(Azerbaijan) Baku	Azerbaijan State Railway

=== Other destinations ===
Country	Destinations
Kazakhstan	Aktau (Mangyshlak), Aktobe
Russia	Adler, Anapa, Balakovo, Balashov, Kislovodsk, Liski, Novorossiysk, Stavropol

=== Suburban destinations ===
Suburban commuter trains (elektrichka) connect Paveletsky station with stations and platforms of the Paveletsky suburban railway line, in particular, with the towns of Vidnoye (Rastorguyevo railway platform), Domodedovo, Stupino, Kashira, and Ozherelye, as well as with the Domodedovo Airport.

=== Airport connections ===
In addition to regular suburban trains, Paveletsky station is connected to Domodedovo International Airport by Aeroexpress trains. They were launched on 3 August 2002. They are not operated by Russian Railways, though they use the same tracks.
