= Biryulyovo Zapadnoye District =

Biryulyovo Zapadnoye District Район Бирюлёво Западное (Russian)
- District
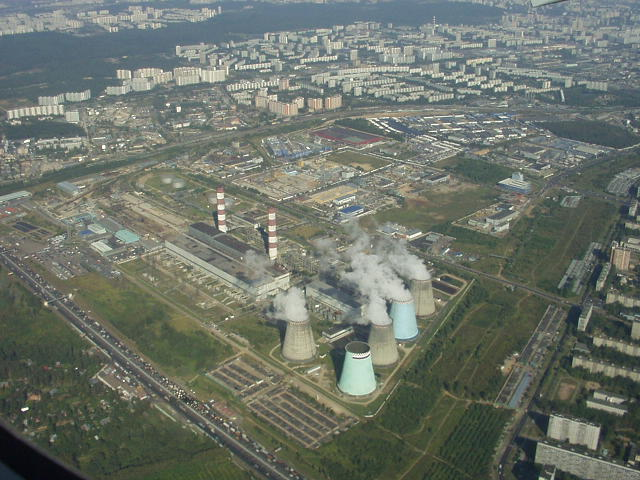
- Moscow TETs-26 Yuzhnaya power plant, Biryulyovo Zapadnoye District

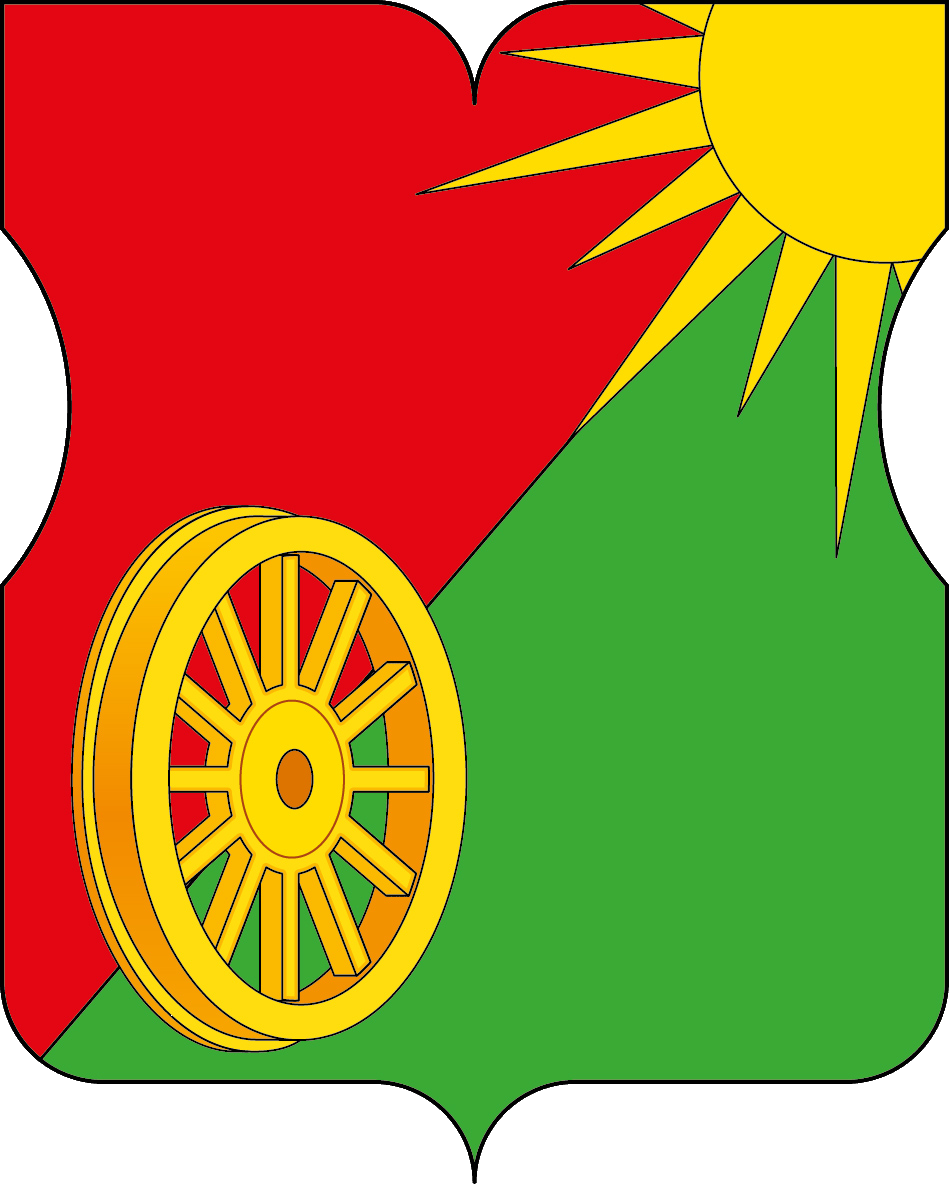
- Flag Coat of arms
- Location of Biryulyovo Zapadnoye District on the map of Moscow (pre-2012 map)
- Coordinates: 55°35′N 37°38′E
- Country: Russia
- Federal subject: Federal city of Moscow

Area
  - Total: 8.5064 km^{2} (3.2843 sq mi)

Population (2010 Census)
  - Total: 85,726
  - Estimate (January 2013): 87,764
  - Density: 10,078/km^{2} (26,101/sq mi)

Municipal structure
  - Municipally incorporated as: Biryulyovo Zapadnoye Municipal Okrug
- Time zone: UTC+
- OKTMO ID: 45912000
- Website: http://birulevo-zapadnoe.mos.ru

Population of Biryulyovo Zapadnoye District
- 2010 Census: 85,726
- 2002 Census: 83,303

Biryulyovo Zapadnoye District (Russian: район Бирюлёво Западное) is a territorial division (a district, or raion) in Southern Administrative Okrug, one of the 125 in the federal city of Moscow, Russia. It is located in the south of the city and borders with Biryulyovo Vostochnoye in the east, Moscow Ring Road (MKAD) in the south, Chertanovo Yuzhnoye in the west, and Chertanovo Tsentralnoye in the north-west. The area of the district is 8.5064 square kilometers (3.2843 sq mi). As of the 2010 Census, the total population of the district was 85,726.

== Municipal status ==
As a municipal division, the district is incorporated as Biryulyovo Zapadnoye Municipal Okrug.

== Economy ==
=== Transportation ===
The eastern border of the district is formed by a railway, and two railway stations, Biryulyovo-Tovarnaya and Biryulyovo-Passazhirskaya, are located in the district. They serve the Paveletsky suburban railway line.

== See also ==
- 2013 Biryulyovo riots
