= Biryulyovo Vostochnoye District =

Biryulyovo Vostochnoye District Район Бирюлёво Восточное (Russian)
- District
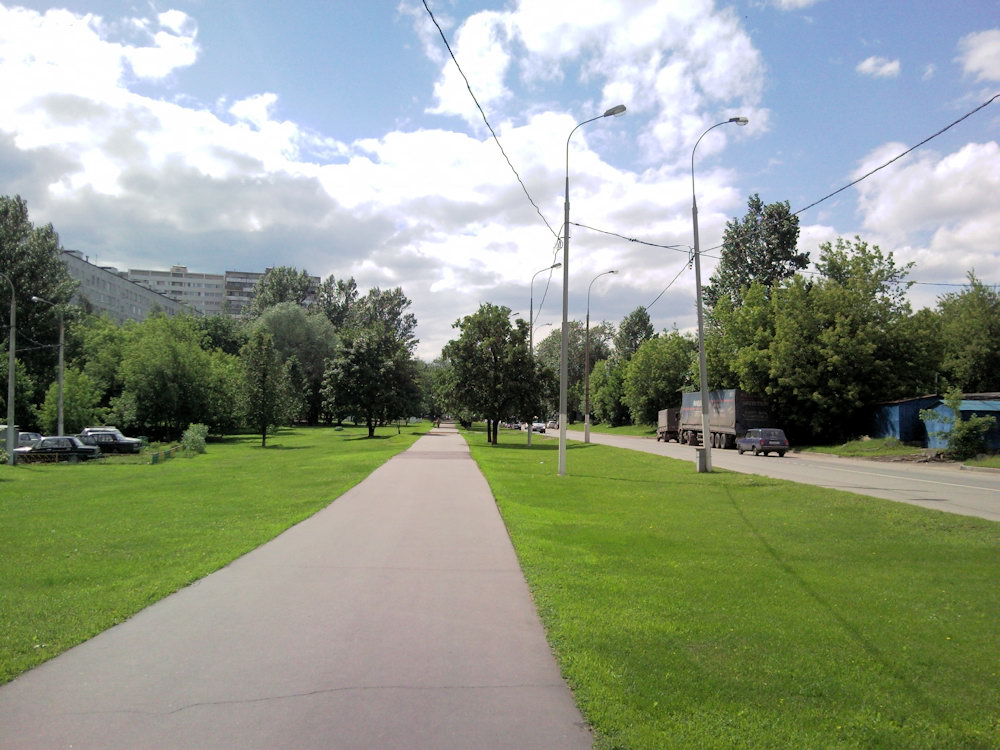
- Elevatornaya Street, Biryulyovo Vostochnoye District

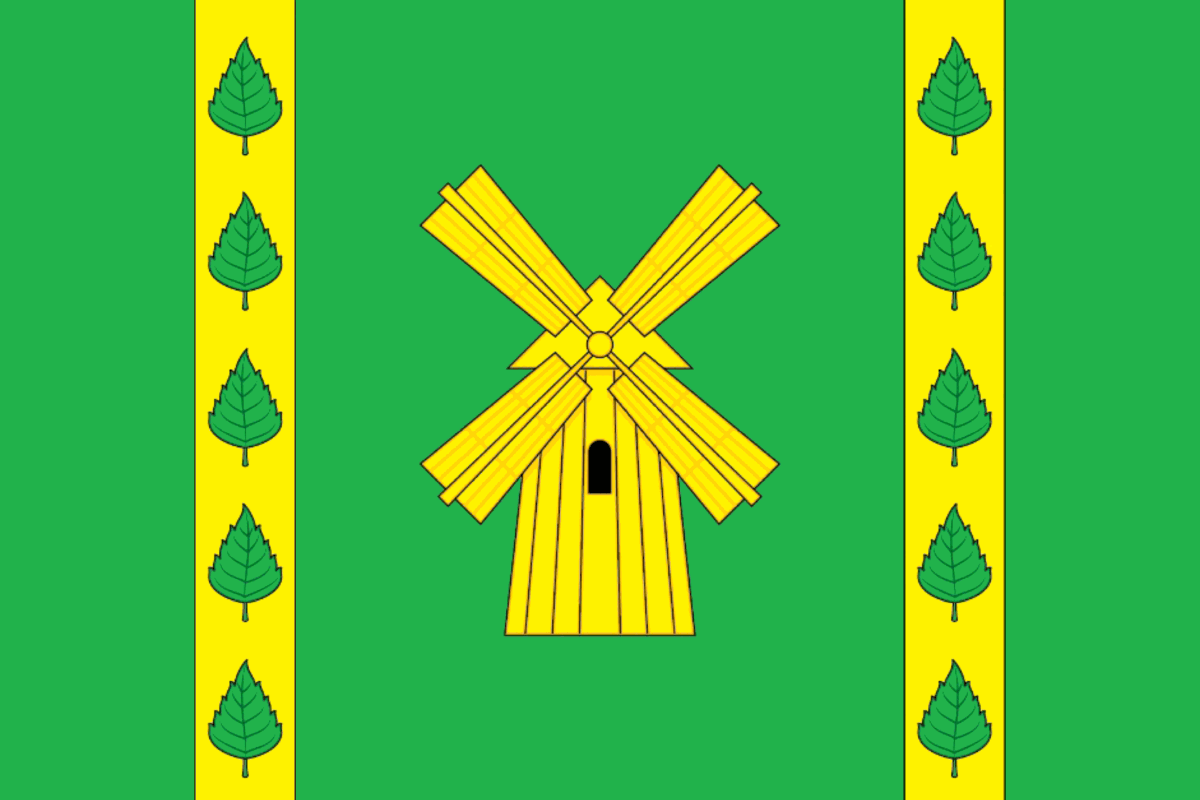
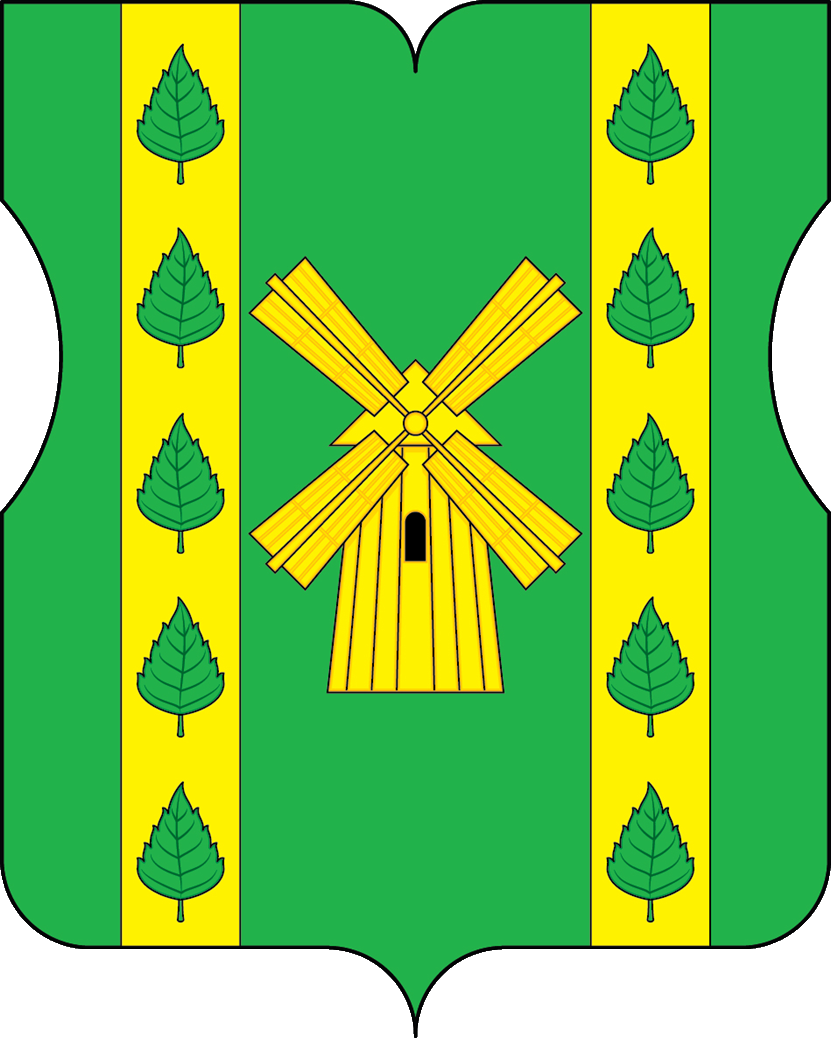
- Flag Coat of arms
- Location of Biryulyovo Vostochnoye District in the federal city of Moscow (pre-2012 map)
- Coordinates: 55°35′N 37°40′E
- Country: Russia
- Federal subject: Federal city of Moscow
- Established: July 5, 1995

Area
  - Total: 14.772 km^{2} (5.704 sq mi)

Population (2010 Census)
  - Total: 145,100
  - Estimate (2013): 148,764
  - Density: 9,823/km^{2} (25,440/sq mi)

Municipal structure
  - Municipally incorporated as: Biryulyovo Vostochnoye Municipal Okrug
- Time zone: UTC+
- OKTMO ID: 45911000
- Website: http://bv.mos.ru

Population of Biryulyovo Vostochnoye District
- 2010 Census: 145,100
- 2002 Census: 129,700

Biryulyovo Vostochnoye District (Russian: район Бирюлёво Восточное) is a territorial division (a district, or raion) in Southern Administrative Okrug, one of the 125 in the federal city of Moscow, Russia. It is located in the south of the city and borders with Biryulyovo Zapadnoye in the west, Tsaritsyno in the north, Orekhovo-Borisovo (Severnoye and Yuzhnoye) in the east, and Moscow Ring Road (MKAD) in the south. The area of the district is 14.772 square kilometers (5.704 sq mi). As of the 2010 Census, the total population of the district was 145,100.

== Municipal status ==
As a municipal division, the district is incorporated as Biryulyovo Vostochnoye Municipal Okrug.

== Economy ==
=== Transportation ===
The western border of the district is formed by a railway, and two railway stations (Biryulyovo-Tovarnaya and Biryulyovo-Passazhirskaya) are located in the district. They serve the Paveletsky suburban railway line. Another railway station within the limits of the district is Tsaritsyno serving the Kursky suburban railway line, Moscow, which is located next to the metro station of the same name.
