= Verkhnie Kotly railway station =

Railway station in Moscow, Russia

Verkhnie Kotly Верхние Котлы
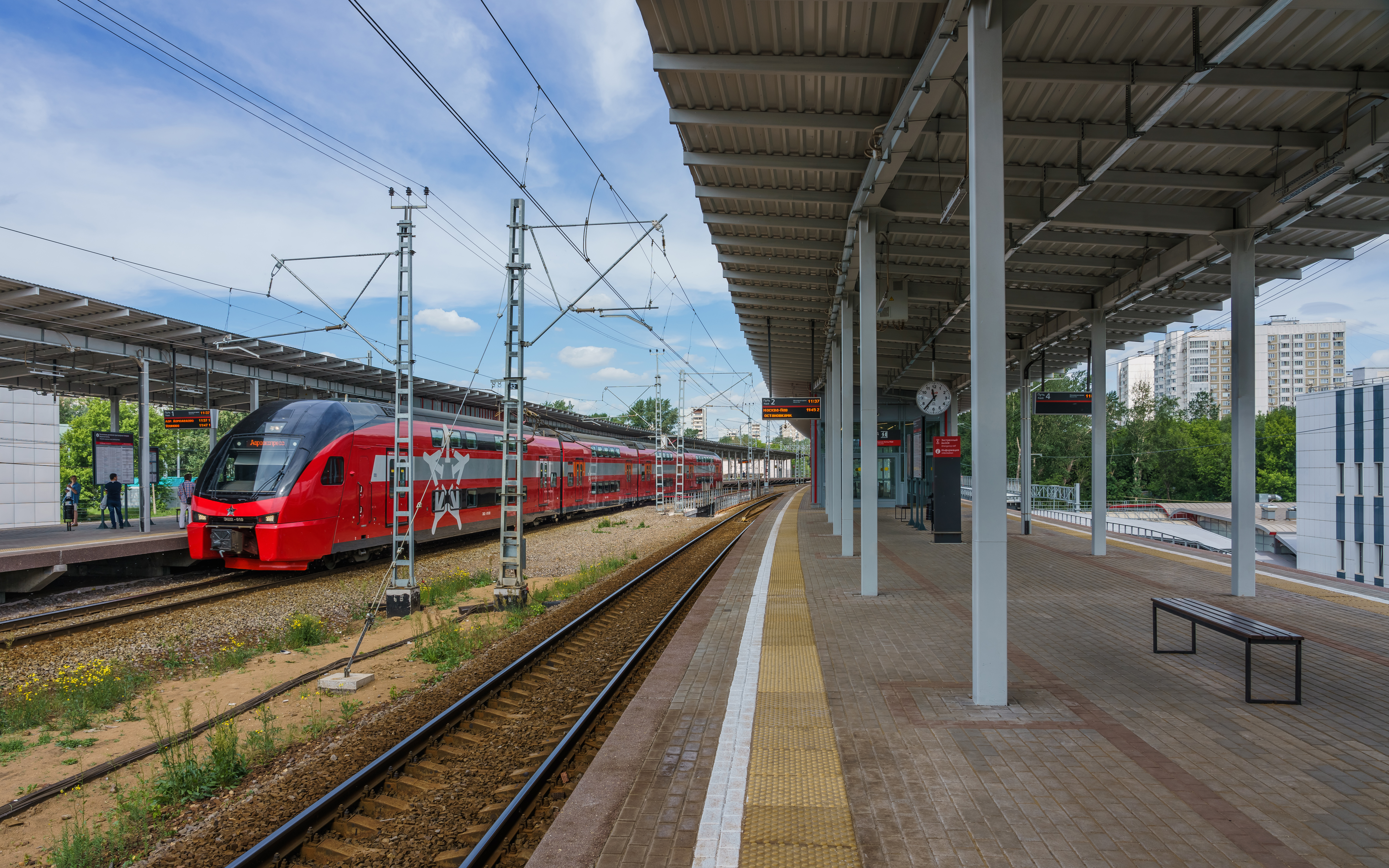

General information
- Location: Nagornyy Proyezd, 2А, Moscow; Russia
- Coordinates: 55.690°N 37.617°E
- System: Moscow Railway platform
- Owner: Russian Railways
- Line: Paveletsky Suburban Line
- Platforms: 2 side platforms
- Tracks: 2
- Connections: Moscow Metro stations: Verknie Kotly Tram: 3, 16, 35, 47 Bus: м5, м6, 44, 142, 186, 275, 700, 907, т10, т71 Trolleybus: 8, 40

Construction
- Cycle facilities: Yes

Other information
- Station code: 196023
- Fare zone: 0

History
- Opened: 2018

Services
| Preceding station | Russian Railways | Following station |
|---|---|---|
| Tulskaya towards Moscow Paveletsky | Paveletsky Suburban | Nizhnye Kotly towards Uzunovo |
| Preceding station | Aeroexpress | Following station |
| Moscow Paveletskaya Terminus | Paveletskaya to Domodedovo | Aeroport Domodedovo Terminus |
Location
- Location within Moscow Ring Road

Verkhnie Kotly (Russian: Верхние Котлы) is a train station of the Paveletsky suburban railway line. It was opened in 2018 to provide an interchange to Moscow Central Circle.

Since December 2018, the Aeroexpress trains to Moscow-Domodedovo from Moscow Paveletsky Railway Station stop at Verkhnie Kotly.
