= 2013 Biryulyovo riots =

Riots in Moscow's southern Biryulyovo district

- Date: 13 October 2013
- Location: Biryulyovo, Moscow, Russia

Parties
| Local people | Moscow City Police; OMON |

Number
| 600 | |

Casualties
- Detained: 200

On 13 October 2013, riots in Biryulyovo Zapadnoye, a district in southern Moscow, erupted. The riots were in response to news that Egor Shcherbakov, a 25-year-old man who was killed on 10 October, had allegedly been attacked by a migrant who "might have come from Central Asia or the Caucasus". The footage of Shcherbakov being stabbed was circulated by news agencies.

The police announced a reward of 1 million rubles (~$30,975) for any information about the suspect.

On 14 October, the police arrested more than 1,200 migrant workers where the killer allegedly lived.

On 15 October, Orkhan Zeynalov, an Azerbaijani citizen, was arrested in Kolomna as a suspect in the killing of Shcherbakov.

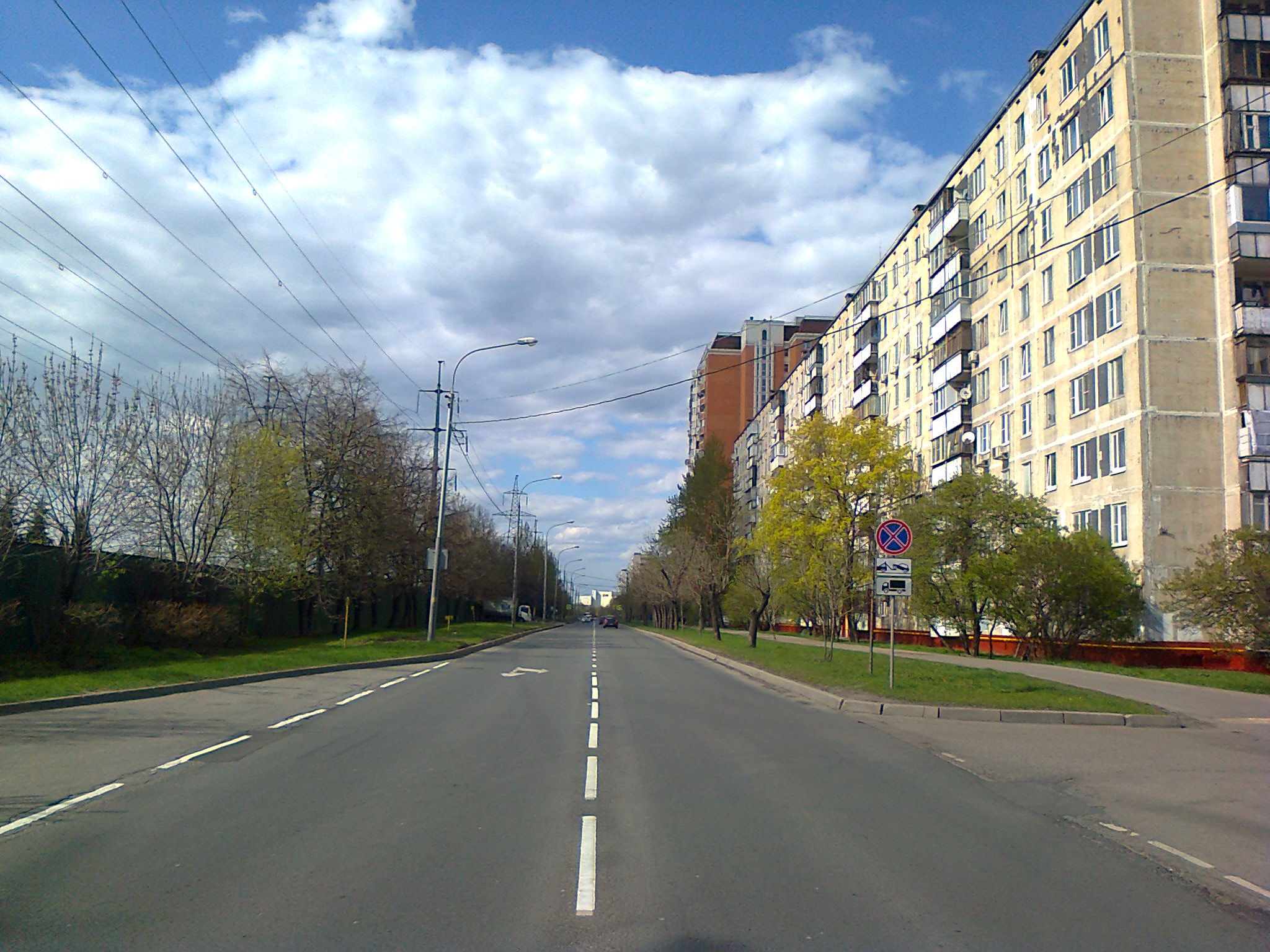
Vostryakovsky Lane where the murder occurred and the initial gatherings begun

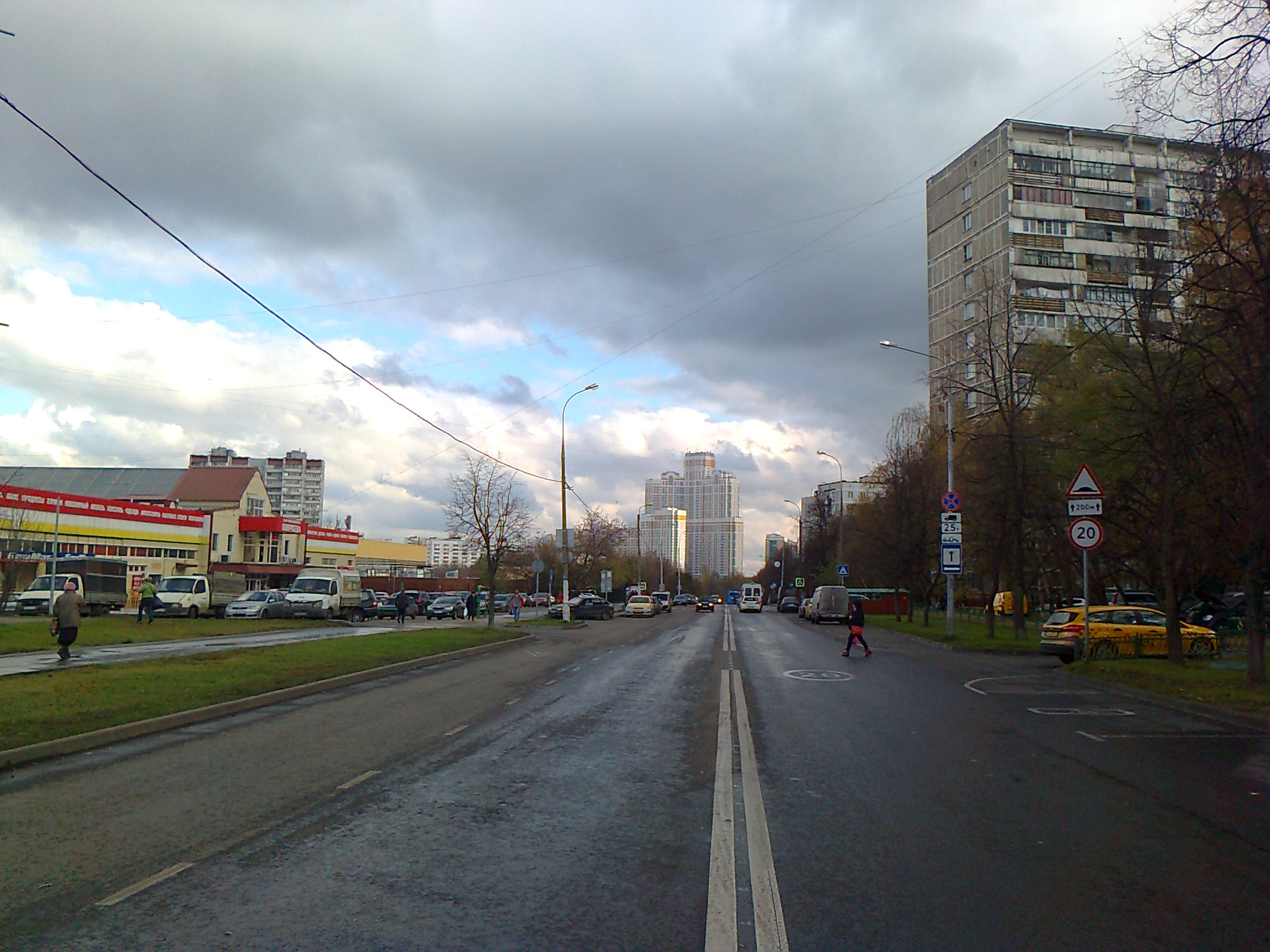
Bulatnikovskaya Street, the location of most major events of 13 October 2013

== See also ==
- Murder of Egor Sviridov (2010), another murder case that sparked riots in Moscow
- Incident against Azerbaijanis in Russia (2025)
