= Stupino, Vladimir Oblast =

Stupino Ступино
- Village
- Location within Vladimir Oblast Location within Russia
- Coordinates: 56°26′N 41°02′E
- Country: Russia
- Region: Vladimir Oblast
- District: Kameshkovsky District
- Time zone: UTC+3:00

Stupino (Russian: Ступино) is a rural locality (a village) in Bryzgalovskoye Rural Settlement, Kameshkovsky District, Vladimir Oblast, Russia. The population was 101 as of 2010.

== Geography ==
Stupino is located on the Seksha River, 16 km northeast of Kameshkovo (the district's administrative centre) by road. Imeni Kirova is the nearest rural locality.
