= Stupinsky =

Stupinsky (masculine), Stupinskaya (feminine), or Stupinskoye (neuter) may refer to:

- Stupinsky District, a district of Moscow Oblast, Russia
- Stupinsky (rural locality), a rural locality (a khutor) in Tula Oblast, Russia
- Stupinskaya, a rural locality (a village) in Arkhangelsk Oblast, Russia
