= Stupino, Astrakhan Oblast =

Stupino Ступино
- Selo
- Location within Astrakhan Oblast Location within Russia
- Coordinates: 48°18′N 45°47′E
- Country: Russia
- Region: Astrakhan Oblast
- District: Chernoyarsky District
- Time zone: UTC+4:00

Stupino (Russian: Ступино) is a rural locality (a selo) in Chernoyarsky District, Astrakhan Oblast, Russia. The population was 519 as of 2010. There are 20 streets.

== Geography ==
Stupino is located 46 km northwest of Chyorny Yar (the district's administrative centre) by road. Pody is the nearest rural locality.
