= Paveletsky suburban railway line =

Railway line in Russia

Paveletsky Suburban Railway

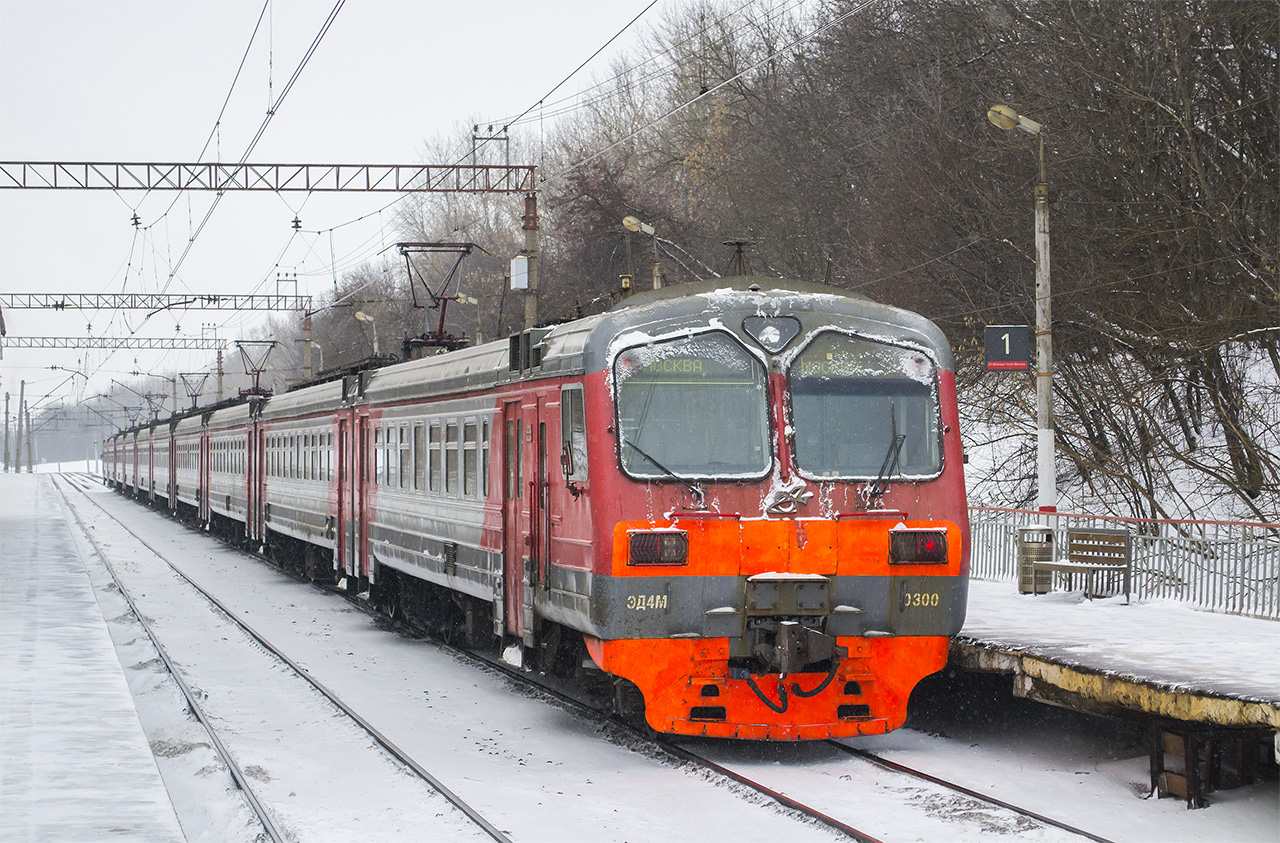
- EMU ED4M at Chertanovo station in 2018.

Overview
- Native name: Павелецкое направление Московской железной дороги
- Owner: Russian Railways
- Locale: Moscow, Ryazan Oblast, Moscow Oblast and Tula Oblast
- Termini: Moscow Paveletsky; Uzunovo
- Stations: 46 (including branch line)

Service
- Type: Commuter rail Airport rail link
- System: Moscow Railway
- Services: Elektrichka; Aeroexpress
- Operator(s): Russian Railways

Technical
- Number of tracks: 2
- Track gauge: 1,520 mm (4 ft 11 27/32 in) Russian gauge
- Electrification: 3 kV DC overhead line

The Paveletsky suburban railway line (Russian: Павелецкое направление Московской железной дороги) is one of eleven suburban railway lines used for suburban railway connections between Moscow, Russia, and surrounding areas, mostly in Moscow Oblast. The Paveletsky suburban railway line connects Moscow with the stations in the southeast, in particular, with the towns of Vidnoye, Domodedovo, Stupino, and Kashira, as well as with the Domodedovo International Airport. The stations the line serves are located in Moscow, as well as in the cities of Vidnoye, Domodedovo, Stupino, Kashira, and the urban-type settlement of Serebryanye Prudy in Moscow Oblast. The suburban trains have their northern terminus at Moscow Paveletsky railway station in Moscow. In the southeastern direction, the suburban trains terminate at Biryulyovo-Passazhirskaya, Domodedovo, Ayeroport, Barybino, Mikhnevo, Stupino, Kashira, Ozherelye, and Uzunovo. The line is served by the Moscow Railway. The tracks between Moscow and Aeroport are also used by Aeroexpress, which runs express trains to Moscow Domodedovo Airport.

The suburban railway line follows the railway which connects Moscow with Lipetsk via Uzlovaya and with Saratov and Volgograd via Pavelets. It is electrified between Moscow and Uzunovo. Between Moscow and Uzunovo, there are two tracks. The distance between Paveletsky railway station and Uzunovo is 159 kilometres (99 mi).

== History ==
The construction of the railway between Moscow and Pavelets, which provided Moscow with access to the Ryazan-Ural Railway started in 1897. The section was built by the Ryazan-Ural Railway itself. Until September 1900, Paveletsky Railway Station in Moscow was not yet completed, and the trains from the station of Zagorye (currently Biryulyovo-Tovarnaya and Biryulyovo-Passazhirskaya) followed to the Kursky railway station.

The electrification of the suburban railway line started in 1953, when the section between Moscow and Domodedovo, and subsequently between Domodedovo and Barybino was completed. In 1954, the electrification was extended to Zhilyovo. The section between Zhilyovo and Ozherelye was electrified in 1955, and Ozherelye became the last station of the suburban railway line. In 1955-1956 the section between Ozherelye and Pavelets was electrified as well, however, this section used the alternating current, in contrast to dc current used between Moscow and Ozherelye, and therefore direct suburban traffic between Moscow and Pavelets was impossible. In 1986, the section between Rybnoye and Uzunovo was completed and electrified using dc current. Because of this, the section between Ozherelye and Uzunovo was switched to dc current as well, and Uzunovo became the terminus of the Paveletsky suburban railway line. The section between Ozherelye and Uzlovaya is not electrified, whereas the section between Uzunovo and Pavelets still uses ac current.

== Stations ==
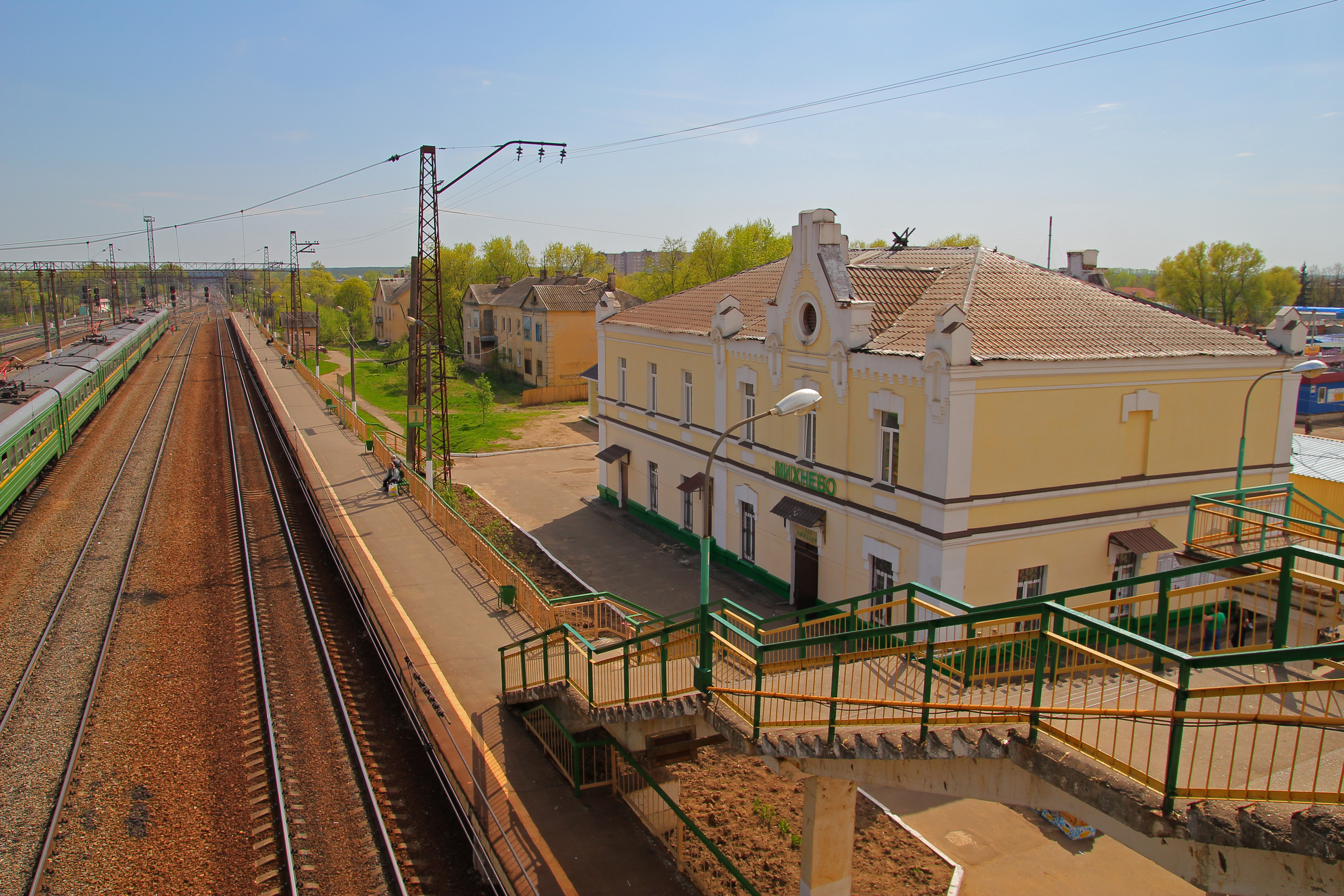
Mikhnevo railway station

Following the standard notations in Russia, a railway stop below is called a station if it is a terminus or if it has a cargo terminal, and it is called a platform otherwise.

=== Moscow to Uzunovo ===
1. Moscow Paveletsky railway station, transfer to Paveletskaya metro station (Zamoskvoretskaya line), Paveletskaya metro station (Koltsevaya line);
2. Moskva Tovarnaya Paveletskaya (stop);
3. Tulskaya (platform);
4. Verkhnie Kotly (platform), Verknie Kotly metro station;
5. Nagatinskaya (platform), Nagatinskaya metro station;
6. Kolomenskoye (station);
7. Chertanovo (platform);
8. Biryulyovo-Tovarnaya (station);
9. Biryulyovo-Passazhirskaya (platform);
10. Bulatnikovo (platform);
11. Rastorguyevo (platform);
12. Kalinina (platform);
13. Leninskaya (platform);
14. 32 km (platform);
15. Domodedovo (station), connection to Aeroport;
16. Vzlyotnaya (platform);
17. Vostryakovo (platform);
18. Belye Stolby (station);
19. 52 km (platform);
20. Barybino (station);
21. Velyaminovo (platform);
22. Privalovo (platform);
23. Mikhnevo (station), connection to Greater Ring of the Moscow Railway;
24. Shugarovo (platform);
25. 85 km (platform);
26. Zhilyovo (station), connection to Greater Ring of the Moscow Railway;
27. Sitenka (platform);
28. Stupino (station);
29. Akri (platform);
30. Belopesotsky (platform);
31. Kashira (station);
32. Tesna (platform);
33. Ozherelye (station), connection to Uzlovaya;
34. 121 km (platform);
35. Purlovo (station);
36. Topkanovo (platform);
37. 137 km (platform);
38. Bogatishchevo (station);
39. 146 km (platform);
40. Korovino (platform);
41. 152 km (platform);
42. Uzunovo (station), connections to Rybnoye and Pavelets.

=== Domodedovo to Aeroport ===
1. Domodedovo (station), Domodedovo;
2. Aviatsionnaya (station), Domodedovo;
3. Kosmos (station);
4. Aeroport (station).
