= Stupino, Ramonsky District, Voronezh Oblast =

Stupino Ступино
- Selo
- Location within Voronezh Oblast Location within Russia
- Coordinates: 51°58′N 39°22′E
- Country: Russia
- Region: Voronezh Oblast
- District: Ramonsky District
- Time zone: UTC+3:00

Stupino (Russian: Ступино) is a rural locality (a selo) and the administrative center of Stupinskoye Rural Settlement, Ramonsky District, Voronezh Oblast, Russia. The population was 605 as of 2010. There are 20 streets.

== Geography ==
Stupino is located 13 km northeast of Ramon (the district's administrative centre) by road. Beryozovo is the nearest rural locality.
