= Moscow Domodedovo Airport =

International airport serving Moscow, Russia

Moscow Domodedovo Airport Московский аэропорт Домодедово

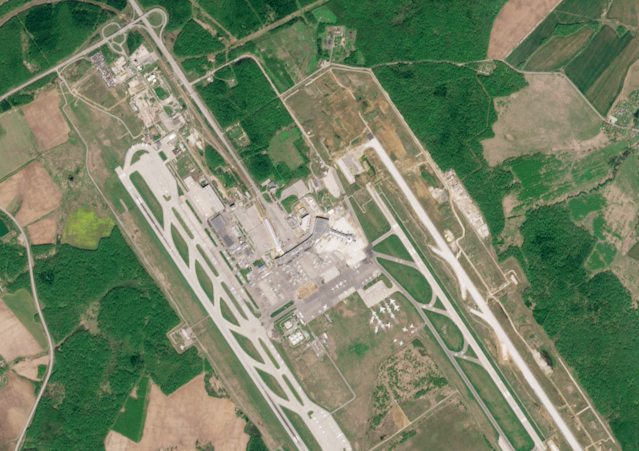
- Satellite view of the airport in May 2020
- IATA: DME; ICAO: UUDD; LID: ДМД

Summary
- Airport type: Public
- Owner: Federal Agency for State Property Management
- Operator: DME Limited
- Serves: Moscow metropolitan area
- Location: Domodedovo
- Opened: 7 April 1962 (64 years ago)
- Hub for: S7 Airlines; Ural Airlines
- Focus city for: IrAero; NordStar; Yamal Airlines
- Time zone: EEST (UTC+03:00)
- Elevation AMSL: 179 m (587 ft)
- Coordinates: 55°24′31″N 37°54′22″E
- Website: domodedovo.ru

Map
- Location of the airport in Moscow Oblast Location of the airport in Russia Location of the airport in Europe

Runways
Direction	Length		Surface
Direction	m	ft	Surface
14L/32R	3,800 (Note: Constructed, but not open yet.)	12,467	Concrete (Closed)
14C/32C	3,794 (Note: Originally 3,794 m, but shortened to 2,370 m due to the construction of the third runway and will eventually be replaced.)	12,448	Concrete
14R/32L	3,500 (Note: The main active runway.)	11,483	Concrete

Statistics (2018)
- Passengers: 15,600,000 (Note: Less than half of its peak, which is 30.6 million in 2017) ▼21.9%
- Aircraft movements: 119,651 (Note: Not officially released due to the bankruptcy of the company, but calculated by the percentage of the data in 2017)
- Notes: Sources

Moscow Domodedovo Airport (Russian: Московский аэропорт Домодедово, IPA: [dəmɐˈdʲɛdəvə]) (IATA: DME, ICAO: UUDD), formally Domodedovo Mikhail Lomonosov International Airport, is an international airport serving Moscow, the capital of Russia. It is located in Domodedovo, Moscow Oblast, 42 kilometres (26 mi) south-southeast from the city centre of Moscow. Domodedovo Airport serves regular flights across Russia and Belarus, as well as to various destinations in Asia, Africa, and the Middle East. As of 2024 it is the 4th busiest airport in Russia and Post-Soviet states (after Sheremetyevo, Pulkovo and Vnukovo) as well as 44th busiest airport in Europe.

In 2019, following a naming contest and a presidential decree, the airport was renamed after Russian scientist Mikhail Lomonosov.

== History ==
The Domodedovo Airport is on the former territory of a village called Elgazino (Russian: Елгозино). The village's wrecked wooden houses (Izba) at 55°25′7″N 37°51′53″E and cemetery with 19th century tombstones at 55°25′26″N 37°51′51″E remained in the early 21st century, less than a kilometer west of the runway, almost immediately behind the fences. The first mention of Elgazino dates back to the 16th century. In 1550, Tsar Ivan the Terrible gave his voivode and boyar Ivan Vasilyevich Sheremetyev a smaller estate in the Moscow district with 150 quarters of land. In 1627, the village appears again in the records and appears as a village of Elgozino on a pond with five peasant households, in the parish of the Church of the Resurrection in the village of Kolychevo. According to the results of the General Survey of the 1760s, the village already had 25 households and 218 inhabitants. In the 1950s, just before the village was demolished, it had a population of about 200 people.

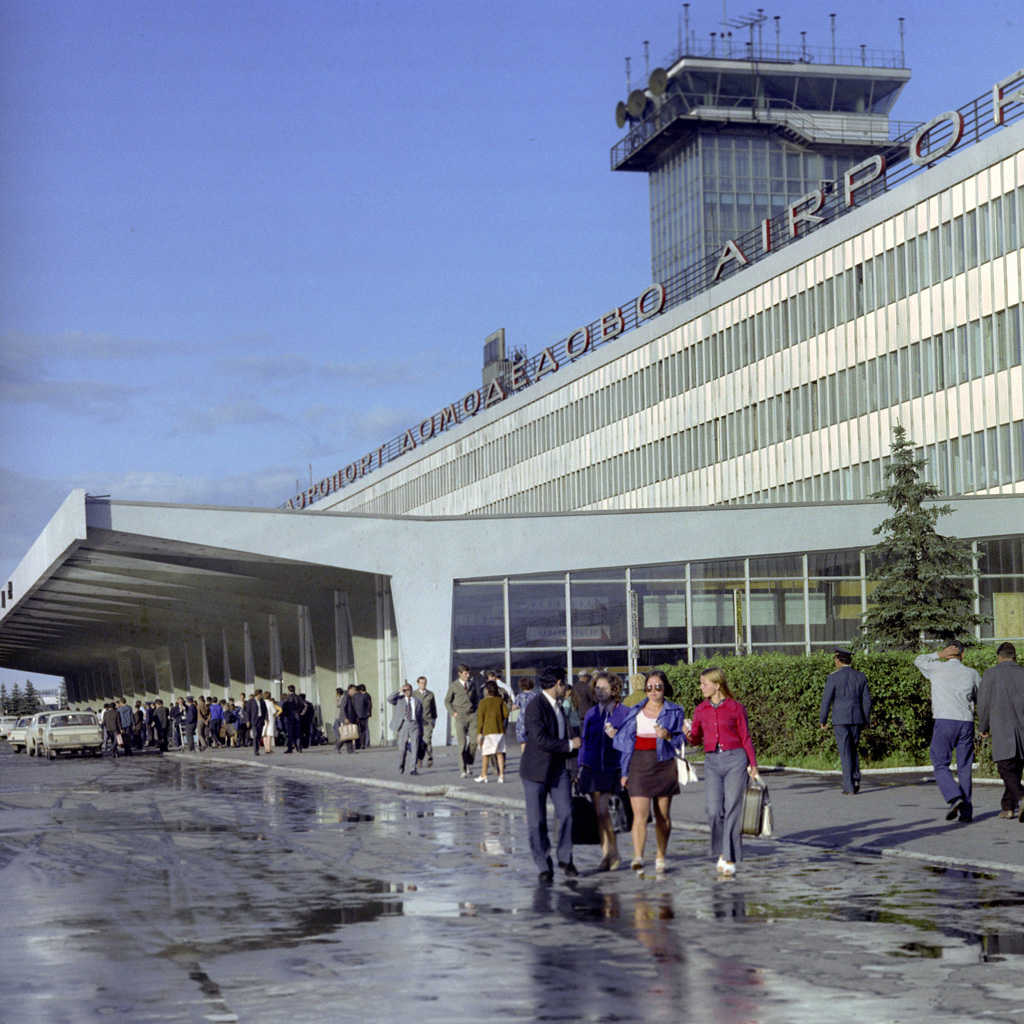
Domodedovo's terminal as it appeared in June 1974

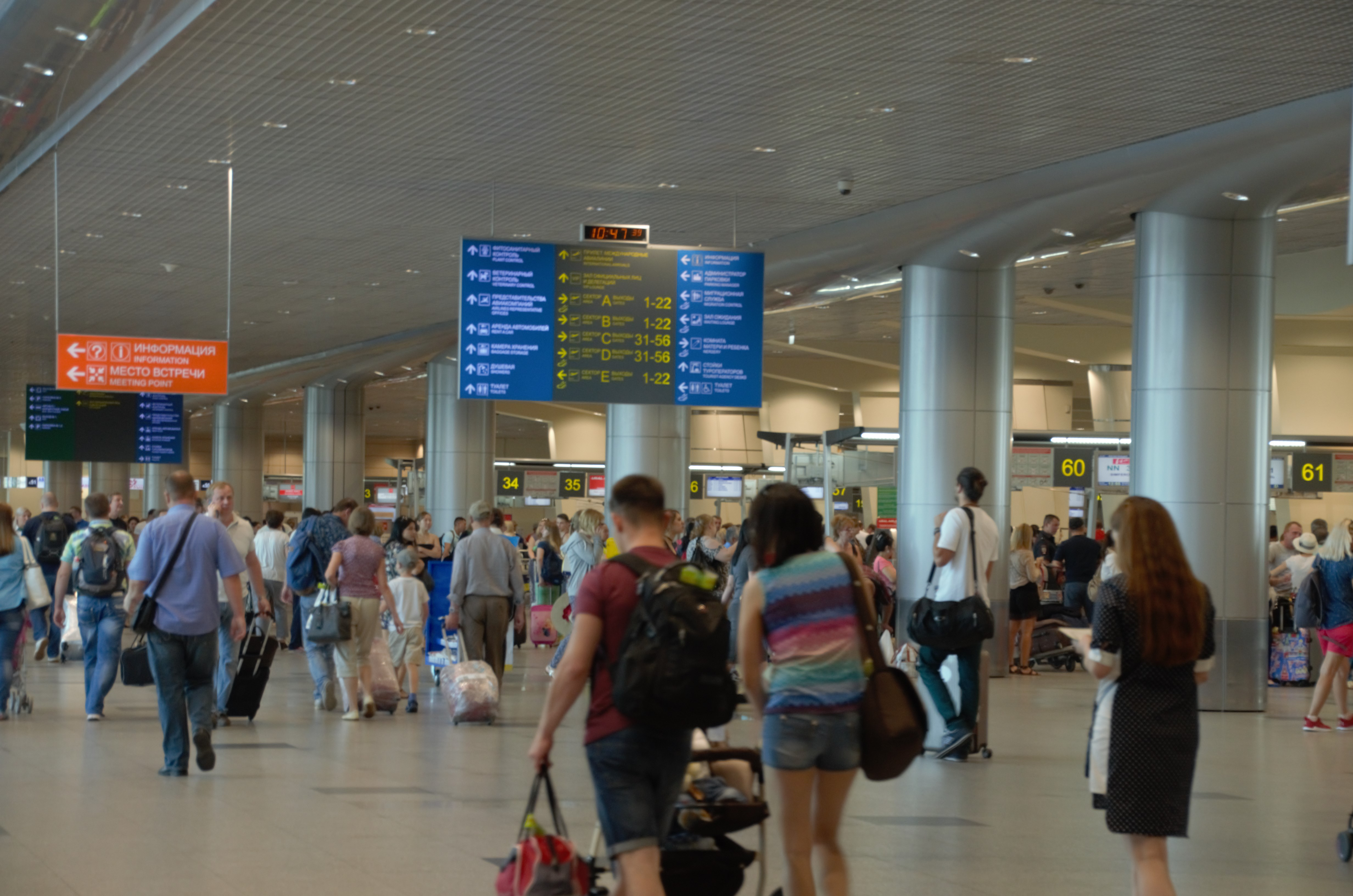
Domodedovo in July 2016

In 1990s, the airport was privatized and came under the control of the private tourist company (later also an airline) East Line founded by Ural entrepreneurs Anton Bakov and Dmitry Kamenshchik. In 1992, their efforts led to the airport obtaining international status (Decree of the Government of the Russian Federation dated 13 July 1992 N 1262-r On the opening of Domodedovo Airport (Moscow) for international flights. Bakov left the business in 1994.

By 2009, the terminal floor space was expanded to 135,000 square metres (1,450,000 sq ft) from 70,000 square metres (750,000 sq ft) in 2004. The renovated terminal and airport facilities allowed the owners of the airport to attract British Airways, China Eastern Airlines, Lufthansa, Royal Air Maroc, Japan Airlines, Austrian Airlines, and Vietnam Airlines who moved their flights from another major international Moscow airport, Sheremetyevo Airport, to Domodedovo. Domodedovo topped Sheremetyevo Airport in terms of passenger traffic becoming the busiest airport in Russia. By 2010, the traffic at Domodedovo rose to over 22 million passengers per year from 2.8 million in 2000.

Domodedovo is Russia's first airport to have parallel runways operating simultaneously.

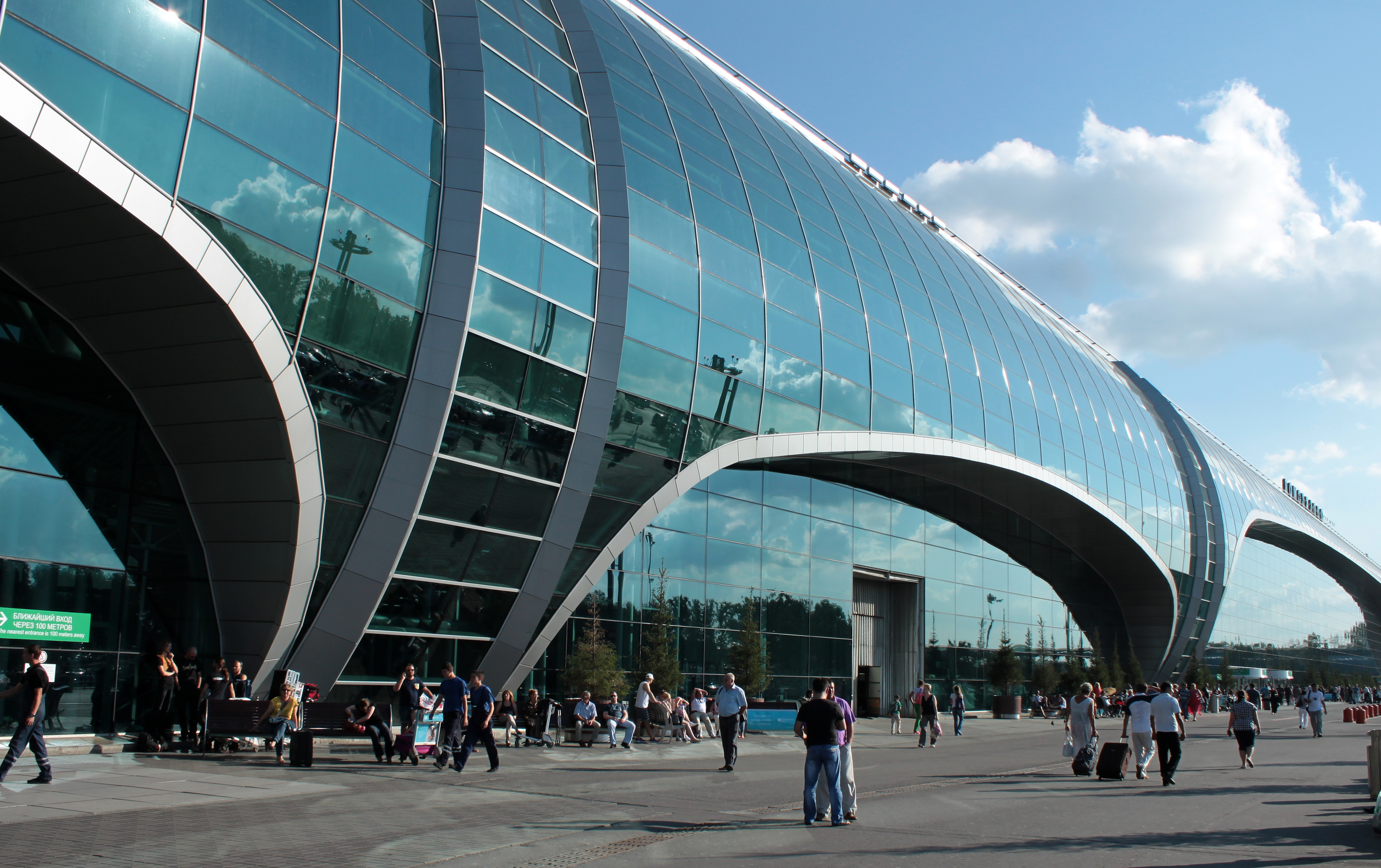
Current main building

In 2003, the airport began an expansion program designed to obtain approval for wide-body aircraft operations. The runway, taxiways, and parking areas were enlarged and strengthened. In March 2009, it was announced that the approval had been granted, making Domodedovo Airport the first airport in Russia approved for new large aircraft (NLA) operations such as the Airbus A380. The approval signifies that its operations areas comply with size and strength requirements of ICAO Category F standards.

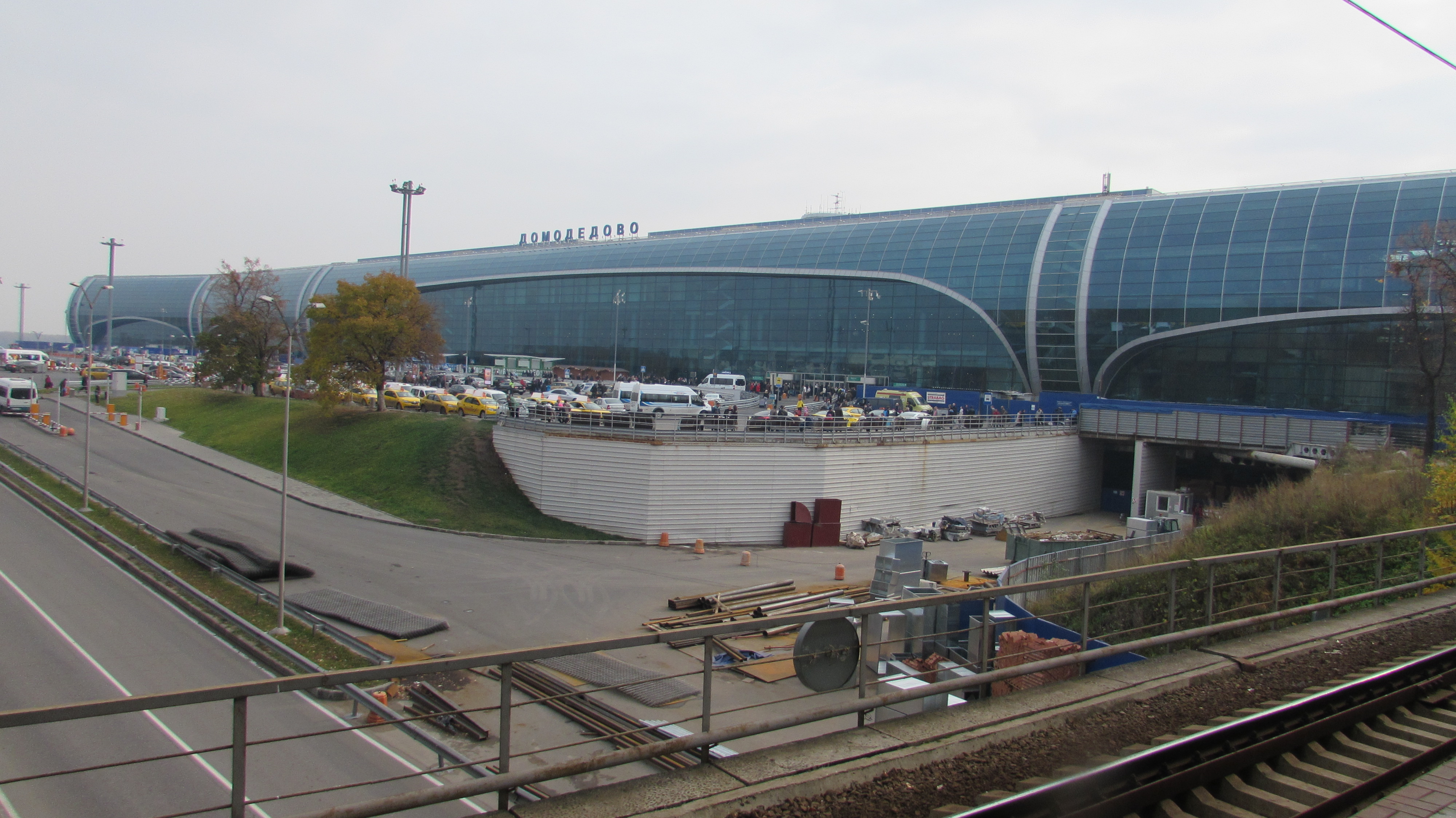
Domodedovo Airport in 2014

On 11 March 2025 the airport was temporarily closed after drone debris fell down on a nearby village and train station during the Russian invasion of Ukraine.

In June 2025, the Russian government took over the airport after a court ruled that its owners, Dmitry Kamenshchik and Valery Kogan, were foreign residents who had no right to manage the airport. Andrei Ivanov, the former deputy minister of economic development, who headed the airport following its nationalization, later said that Domodedovo was in significant debt and was seeking a new owner. In December 2025, finance minister Anton Siluanov said the government was planning to sell the airport in early 2026. After a failed auction with an initial starting price of 132 billion rubles in January 2026, the airport was finally sold later in the month to Perspektiva, a subsidiary of Sheremetyevo International Airport, for 66.1 billion rubles ($880.2 million).

== Airport facilities ==
=== Terminals ===
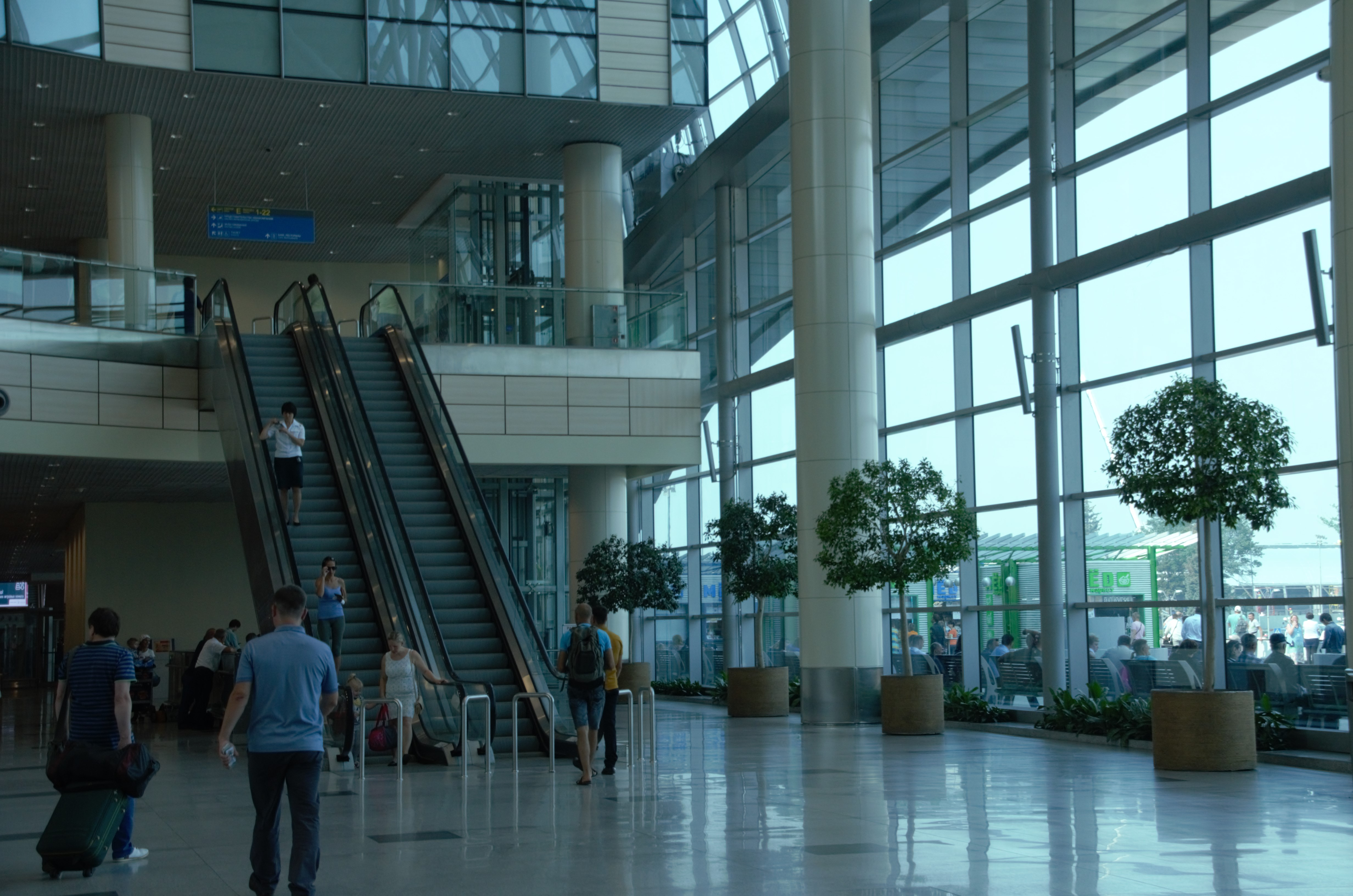
Terminal interior

The project is implemented within the framework of the architectural concept UNDER ONE ROOF: a single terminal allows the most efficient use of the transfer potential of the airport complex. The number of jetways increased to 40, including dual ones for servicing large-capacity aircraft, after the opening of the new segment of the passenger terminal (T2).

=== Terminal 2 ===
The first stage of Terminal 2 was built as part of the 2018 FIFA World Cup program, for international flights. When completed, the international flights operated at concourse B were all shifted to the new segment, which became the second segment of a new passenger terminal and is twice the size of Terminal 5 at London Heathrow – the equivalent of 61 football fields. An area of 235,000 square metres (2,530,000 sq ft) (segment T2) was mounted to the left wing of the existing terminal. There are about 100 check-in counters, 40 self check-in kiosks, as well as special jetways for the world's largest passenger aircraft, Airbus A380. As a result, the total area of the passenger terminal (including the expansion of the current main segment T1) was more than doubled to nearly 500,000 square metres (5,400,000 sq ft). It was designed by the British company RMJM and uses the under-the-roof concept, which means that passengers from all flights will be serviced within a single terminal. One of Europe's largest air hubs – Amsterdam Airport Schiphol – operates under this concept. The construction was initially planned to be finished by March 2018, however, due to immediate changes in contractor, the construction was delayed significantly. During 2018, terminal staff worked only in specific arrival and departure zones for football fans, travelling with special fan-centered passports. The terminal was fully completed with all remaining parts left for work, in 2020.

Moscow Domodedovo Airport has commissioned a new segment of the passenger terminal – T2, increasing the area of the air harbor to almost 500,000 square metres (5,400,000 sq ft). The total capacity of the airport will exceed 60 million passengers per year. The new segment is 7 floors with a total area of about 240,000 square metres (2,600,000 sq ft).

=== Terminal 3 and Aeroexpress Terminal ===
In 2021 a new Aeroexpress terminal was opened, connected by a covered walkway to the airport terminal building.

=== Hotel ===
In September 2017, a new hotel was opened inside the airport terminal ("Aerotel Express"). This allows passengers transiting through Moscow to stay at a hotel without exiting the terminal (previously transit passengers had to leave the terminal and use a shuttle van to access the nearest hotel). This was the first hotel inside an airport terminal in Russia.

=== Lounges ===
Business lounges are available to business class passengers, participants of airline bonus programs and passengers, regardless of the class of the air ticket, who pay for the service in cash.

In 2023 the Horizon lounge opened in the new segment of the passenger terminal (T2) – a lounge-waiting area, a buffet, a coworking area, a shower room and a playroom for children.

=== Family Service ===
The baby care room provides facilities for children aged 0 to 14 years. Family Service guests have access to playrooms, bedrooms and changing room, as well as a dining area with kitchen.

=== DME MED ===
The first in Russia consultative and diagnostic clinic based on the airport's medical center is located in the new segment of the passenger terminal. The clinic offers a full range of laboratory tests, including genetic, as well as a wide range of functional, medical ultrasound, cosmetology and psychological services.

== Airlines and destinations ==
=== Passenger ===
In response to the Russian invasion of Ukraine in February 2022, many countries have moved to ban Russian airlines from their air space and many countries ban airlines from flying in and out of Russian airspace. Other airlines from the European Union, North America, the United Kingdom, Switzerland, Norway, Iceland, South Korea, Japan, Taiwan and Singapore have indefinitely suspended their services to Domodedovo.

The following airlines operate regular scheduled and charter services to and from Domodedovo:

Airlines	Destinations
Air Arabia	Ras Al Khaimah (suspended until 27 March 2027), Sharjah
Avia Traffic Company	Bishkek
Azerbaijan Airlines	Baku
Belavia	Minsk
Centrum Air	Namangan
FlyOne	Yerevan
Egyptair	Cairo, Hurghada, Sharm El Sheikh
El Al	Tel Aviv (suspended until 25 March 2027)
Emirates	Dubai-International
Ethiopian Airlines	Addis Ababa
NordStar	Kurgan, Mineralnye Vody, Norilsk, Samara, Sochi, Ufa
Qanot Sharq	Bukhara, Fergana, Namangan, Tashkent
Royal Jordanian	Aqaba (resumes 20 December 2026), Amman–Queen Alia
S7 Airlines	Aşgabat, Antalya, Blagoveshchensk, Chita, Gorno-Altaysk, Irkutsk, Istanbul, Izhevsk, Kaliningrad, Kazan, Kemerovo, Kyzyl, Makhachkala, Mineralnye Vody, Norilsk, Novokuznetsk, Novosibirsk, Öskemen, Saint Petersburg, Sochi, Tomsk, Ufa, Ulan-Ude, Urgench, Vladikavkaz, Yakutsk; Seasonal: Apatity/Kirovsk, Dubai–Al Maktoum (suspended)
Severstal Avia	Cherepovets
Sky FRU	Bishkek
Somon Air	Dushanbe
Ural Airlines	Blagoveshchensk, Istanbul, Kaliningrad, Krasnodar, Namangan, Noyabrsk, Qarshi, Samarqand, Yerevan; Seasonal: Gelendzhik; Seasonal charter: Dubai–Al Maktoum
Uzbekistan Airways	Tashkent

=== Cargo ===
Airlines	Destinations
Suparna Airlines	Nanjing, Zhengzhou

== Statistics ==
=== Annual traffic ===
Annual passenger traffic
Year	Passengers	% Change
2010	22,254,529	Steady
2011	25,701,610	▲15.5%
2012	28,000,000	▲9%
2013	30,760,000	▲10%
2014	33,039,531	▲7.5%
2015	30,504,515	▼ -7.7%
2016	28,366,800	▼ -7%
2017	30,700,000	▲7.6%
2018	29,400,000	▼ -4.3%
2019	28,252,337	▼ -4.1%
2020	16,389,427	▼ -42%
2021	25,065,087	▲52.9%
2022	21,200,000	▼ -15%
2023		
2024	15,600,000	
2025	13,800,000	

== Other facilities ==
- Russian Sky Airlines had its head office on the airport property.
- Transaero had its head office at Domodedovo Airport.
- When Domodedovo Airlines existed, its head office was on the airport property.

== Ground transportation ==
=== Rail ===
The airport has a railway station with service to the Paveletsky Rail Terminal in central Moscow. The rail connection, which was completed in 2002, provides Aeroexpress trains (takes 45 min; coach class costs 500 rubles, business class costs 1,000 rubles), with two stops at Paveletsky Rail Terminal and Verkhnie Kotly railway station. Regular suburban commuter trains in the Paveletsky suburban railway line take 65 to 70 min and cost 198 rubles, but are infrequent during the day.

=== Bus ===
Connection to Moscow is served by bus 308, 1185 Aeroexpress and commercial marshrutka minivans (more frequent departures): to Domodedovskaya of Moscow Metro Zamoskvoretskaya Line (#2).

Local buses and marshrutkas 11, 26, 30, 17k, 30k, 47k, 52k link to nearby towns and connect to the railway station in the Paveletsky suburban railway line at Domodedovo municipality.

Bus 999 is south-east bound and connects the airport to Bronnitsy, Kolomna and Ryazan.

=== Road ===
The airport has several long and short term parking lots. The terminal itself is accessed from the junction of Moscow Ring Road and Kashirskoye Highway via a designated 22 kilometres (14 mi) four-lane freeway. Passengers can use the services of a licensed taxi, popular mobile applications for ordering a car, as well as take a carsharing located in the parking P3.

== Accidents and incidents ==
- On 5 December 1999, a cargo variant of the Ilyushin Il-114 crashed during a test flight at Domodedovo, killing five and injuring two.
- On 24 August 2004, Volga-AviaExpress Flight 1303, and Siberia Airlines Flight 1047 were simultaneously bombed, killing 44 on the first, and 46 on the latter, for a total of 90 people killed in total.
- On 22 March 2010, a Tu-204 operating Aviastar-TU Flight 1906, a ferry flight without passengers and with 8 crew from Hurghada, Egypt, crashed in a forest 2 kilometres (1.2 mi) away from the airport while trying to land in fog. There were no fatalities and the crew escaped the crashed aircraft on their own, but four of them were seriously injured.
- On 4 December 2010, South East Airlines Flight 372 made an emergency landing at Domodedovo, killing two people and injuring 56.
- On 11 February 2018, Saratov Airlines Flight 703, an Antonov 148 crashed shortly after takeoff, killing all 71 people on board.

== See also ==
- List of the busiest airports in Russia
- List of the busiest airports in Europe
- List of the busiest airports in the former USSR
