= Stupino, Savinsky District, Ivanovo Oblast =

Stupino Ступино
- Village
- Location within Ivanovo Oblast Location within Russia
- Coordinates: 56°34′N 41°26′E
- Country: Russia
- Region: Ivanovo Oblast
- District: Savinsky District
- Time zone: UTC+3:00

Stupino (Russian: Ступино) is a rural locality (a village) in Savinsky District, Ivanovo Oblast, Russia. Population: 14 (2010 census);

== Geography ==
This rural locality is located 14 kilometres (8.7 mi) from Savino (the district's administrative centre), 55 kilometres (34 mi) from Ivanovo (capital of Ivanovo Oblast) and 251 kilometres (156 mi) from Moscow. Dubakino is the nearest rural locality.
