= Domodedovo (town) =

Domodedovo Домодедово
- Town
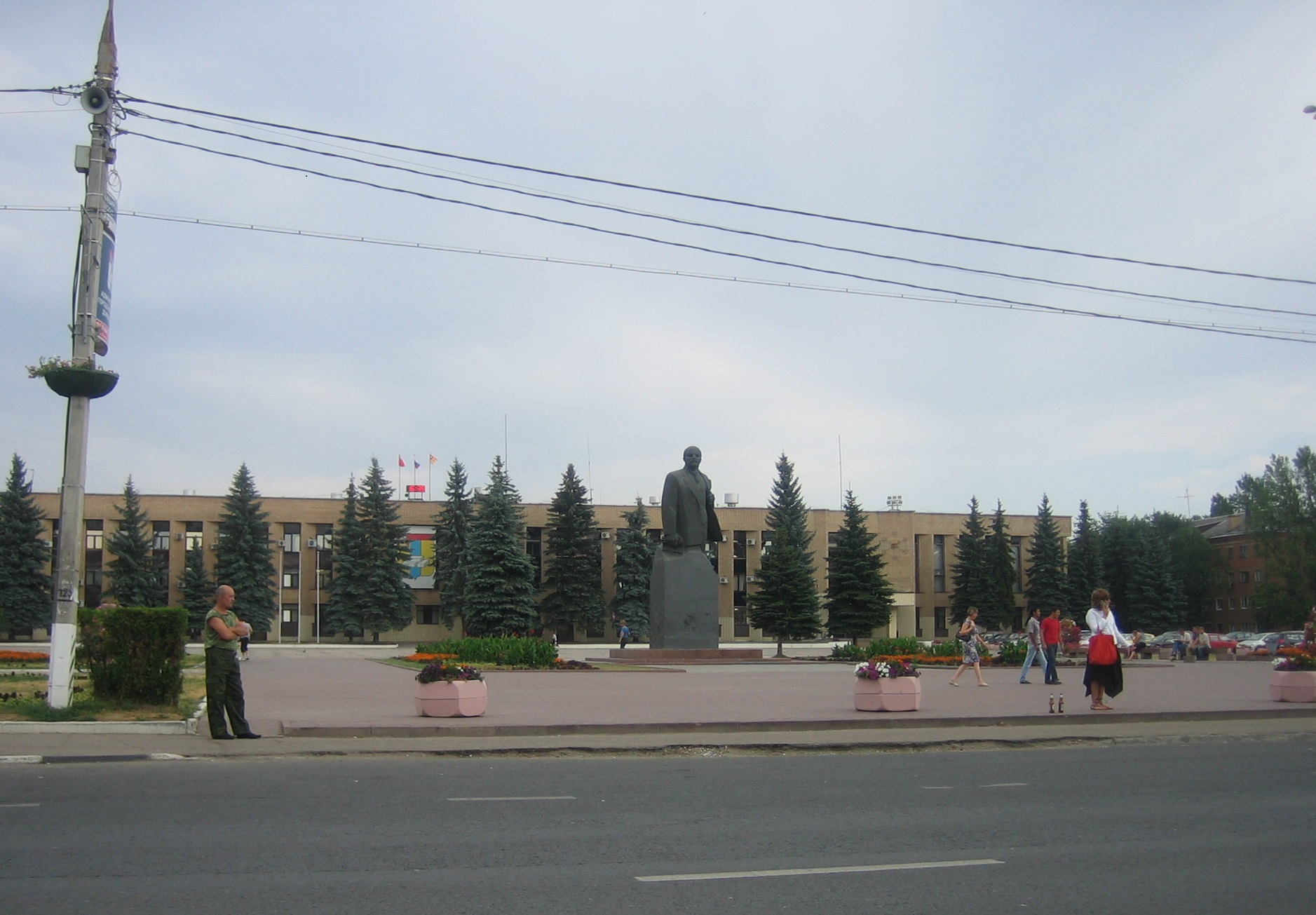
- Monument to Vladimir Lenin in Domodedovo

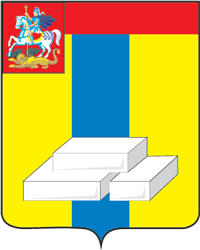
- Flag Coat of arms
- Interactive map of Domodedovo
- Location of Domodedovo Domodedovo (Moscow Oblast)
- Coordinates: 55°26′24″N 37°45′43″E
- Country: Russia
- Federal subject: Moscow Oblast
- Founded: 1900
- Town status since: 1947

Government
  - Body: Council of Deputies

Area
  - Total: 159.27 km^{2} (61.49 sq mi)
- Elevation: 160 m (520 ft)

Population (2010 Census)
  - Total: 96,145
  - Estimate (2025): 158,046 (+64.4%)
  - Rank: 177th in 2010
  - Density: 603.66/km^{2} (1,563.5/sq mi)

Administrative status
  - Subordinated to: Domodedovo Town Under Oblast Jurisdiction
  - Capital of: Domodedovo Town Under Oblast Jurisdiction

Municipal status
  - Urban okrug: Domodedovo Urban Okrug
  - Capital of: Domodedovo Urban Okrug
- Time zone: UTC+3 (MSK)
- Postal code: 142000
- Dialing codes: +7 49679; 495 546-8x-xx
- OKTMO ID: 46709000001
- Website: www.domod.ru

Domodedovo (Russian: Домодедово, IPA: [dəmɐˈdʲedəvə]) is a city in Moscow Oblast, Russia, located 37 kilometers (23 mi) south of the capital Moscow. The population estimated in different years are 152,404 (2021 census); 96,145 (2010 census); 54,080 (2002 census); 55,294 (1989 Soviet census).. The increase of population is due to the merger of three neighboring inhabited localities into the town in 2004.

Historical population
Year	Pop.	±%
1926	300	—
1939	8,684	+2794.7%
1959	27,686	+218.8%
1970	36,323	+31.2%
1979	46,968	+29.3%
1989	55,294	+17.7%
2002	54,080	−2.2%
2010	96,145	+77.8%
2021	152,404	+58.5%
Source: Census data

== Geography ==
The town is located on the Moskva-Oka plain, in the center of the East European Plain, south-east of the capital, 37 km from the center of Moscow, on the Moscow – Kashira highway and the Paveletsky suburban railway line, near the federal highway, M-4 "Don". Most of the town is located to the west of the railway line. The town stretches from north to south along the railroad tracks on 26 kilometers. The climate is moderate continental, with cold, snowy winters, and warm, humid summers. The frequent passage of cyclones from the Atlantic and the Mediterranean sometimes causes an increase in cloud cover. Average mid-January temperature is about −10,5 °C, and mid-July is +17,5 °C. The average duration of the frost-free period is 130 days. Soil is alluvial, gray forest. Water resources are virtually non-existent. The main rivers that flows in the area are Rozhayka, Severka and Pakhra Rivers.

== History ==
The name of the modern town, Domodedovo which was incorporated in 1900, was given after nearby village with the same name, was first mentioned around 1401 in the spiritual literacy of Vladimir the Bold, Prince of Serpukhov and Borovski. The modern city is located on the old road, Kashira way, that for centuries connected Moscow with Kashira and multiple other southern cities.

In the 17th century within the town of Domodedovo two villages existed: Nazarevo (Russian: Назарьево) and Sknilovo (Russian: Скнилово). The exact date of their disappearance is unknown.

In 1781, during the administrative reform of Catherine II a city called Nikitsk was founded on site Kolychёva village and was a district seat in the Moscow Governorate. The Nikitsky District included Domodedovo village as well as Nikitskoye, Bityagovo and Zaborye which were part of the territory of today's Domodedovo District, and directly, on the territory of the town itself.

Almost until the middle of the 19th century the town area was overgrown with small bushes and deciduous trees. During 1861 the peasant reform, on part of the land that belonged to the town of Podolsk in Domodedovo District, the Domodedovo palace forest dacha was formed.

Domodedovo was founded in 1900 as a settlement next to a train station of the same name. It was called after a nearby village of Domodedovo, which is known to have existed since 1410. It was granted town status in 1947. The Domodedovo International Airport is located a few kilometers away from Domodedovo proper.

In 2007, a referendum on the building of a toll motorway within the city limits took place, where 95% of the inhabitants voted against. A group of residents of Domodedovo have announced the establishment of the "Russian Democratic Republic" and asked the European Union for official recognition.

== Administrative and municipal status ==
Within the framework of administrative divisions, together with 139 rural localities, it was incorporated as Domodedovo Town Under Oblast Jurisdiction—an administrative unit with the status equal to that of the districts. The administrative division was established on 1 April 2011 as a result of abolishing Domodedovsky District, the territory of which was re-organized as the town under oblast jurisdiction.

As a municipal division, Domodedovo Town Under Oblast Jurisdiction is incorporated as Domodedovo Urban Okrug.

== Economy ==
There is a big industrial area with construction materials plants and warehouses complexes. Transaero had its head office on the property of Domodedovo Airport.

== Media ==
The local newspaper is Prizyv; the local TV-stations are TV-Domodedovo and Aviatel.
