= Ozherelye =

Ozherelye Ожерелье
- Town
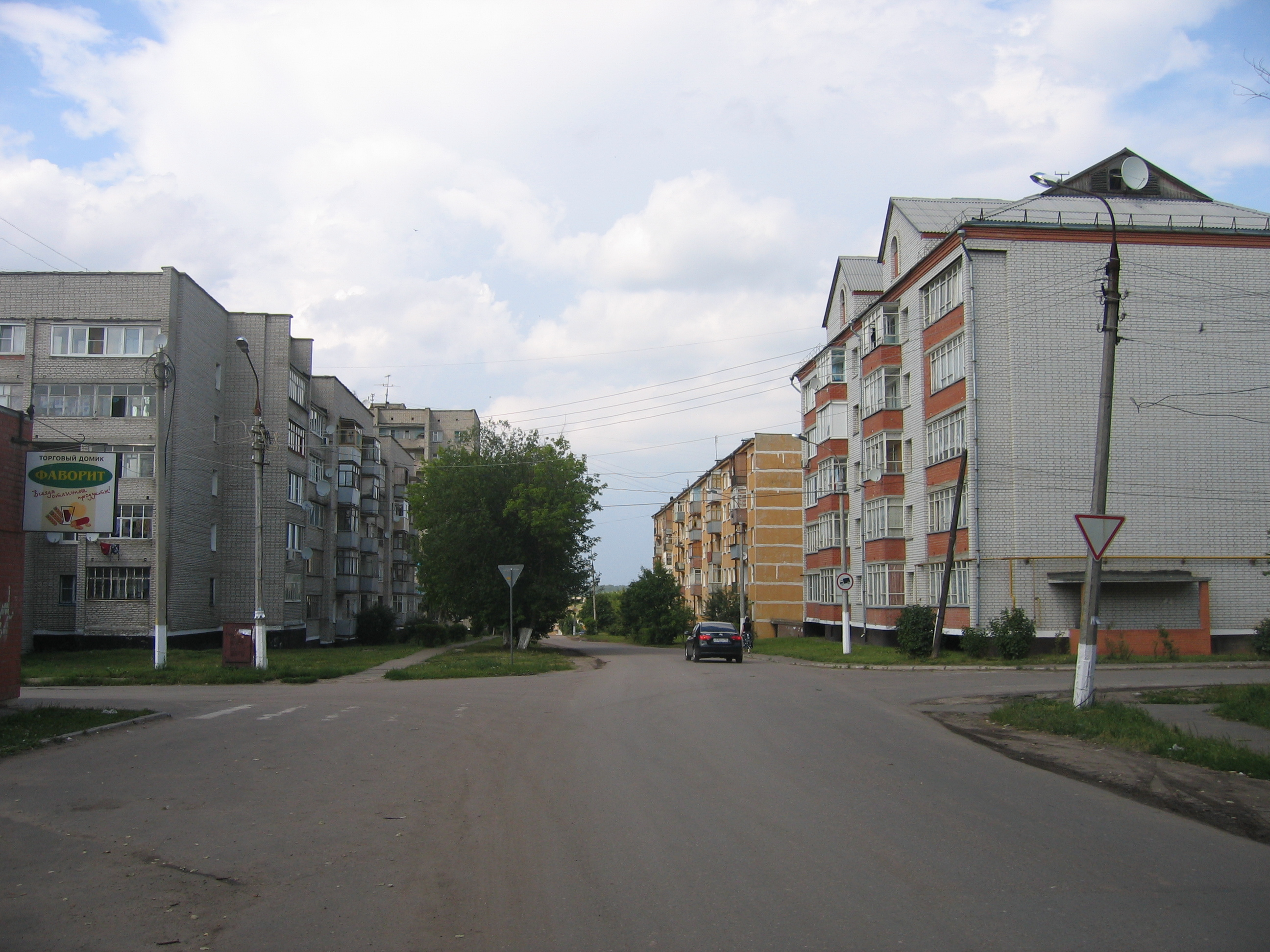
- Pionerskaya Street in Ozherelye

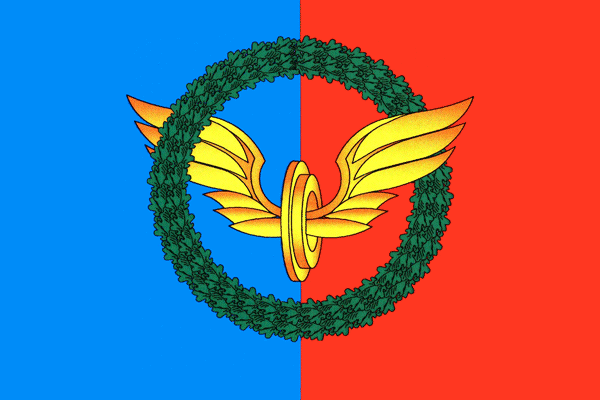
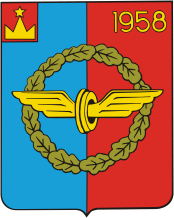
- Flag Coat of arms
- Interactive map of Ozherelye
- Location of Ozherelye Ozherelye (Moscow Oblast)
- Coordinates: 54°48′N 38°17′E
- Country: Russia
- Federal subject: Moscow Oblast
- Administrative district: Kashirsky District
- TownSelsoviet: Ozherelye
- First mentioned: 1578
- Town status since: 1958
- Elevation: 210 m (690 ft)

Population (2010 Census)
  - Total: 10,469
  - Estimate (2015): 10,292 (−1.7%)

Administrative status
  - Capital of: Town of Ozherelye

Municipal status
  - Municipal district: Kashirsky Municipal District
  - Urban settlement: Ozherelye Urban Settlement
  - Capital of: Ozherelye Urban Settlement
- Time zone: UTC+3 (MSK)
- Postal codes: 142920, 142921
- OKTMO ID: 46620104001

Ozherelye (Russian: Ожерелье, IPA: [ɐʐɨˈrʲelʲjɪ]) is a microdistrict of the town of Kashira, formerly a town in Kashirsky District of Moscow Oblast, Russia, located 118 kilometers (73 mi) south of Moscow and 10 kilometers (6.2 mi) southeast of Kashira, the administrative center of the district. Population: 10,469 (2010 census); 11,113 (2002 census); 16,231 (1989 Soviet census).

== History ==
It was first mentioned in 1578 as a village and was granted town status in 1958.

== Administrative and municipal status ==
Within the framework of administrative divisions, it is, together with three rural localities, incorporated within Kashirsky District as the Town of Ozherelye. As a municipal division, the Town of Ozherelye is incorporated within Kashirsky Municipal District as Ozherelye Urban Settlement.

== Transportation ==
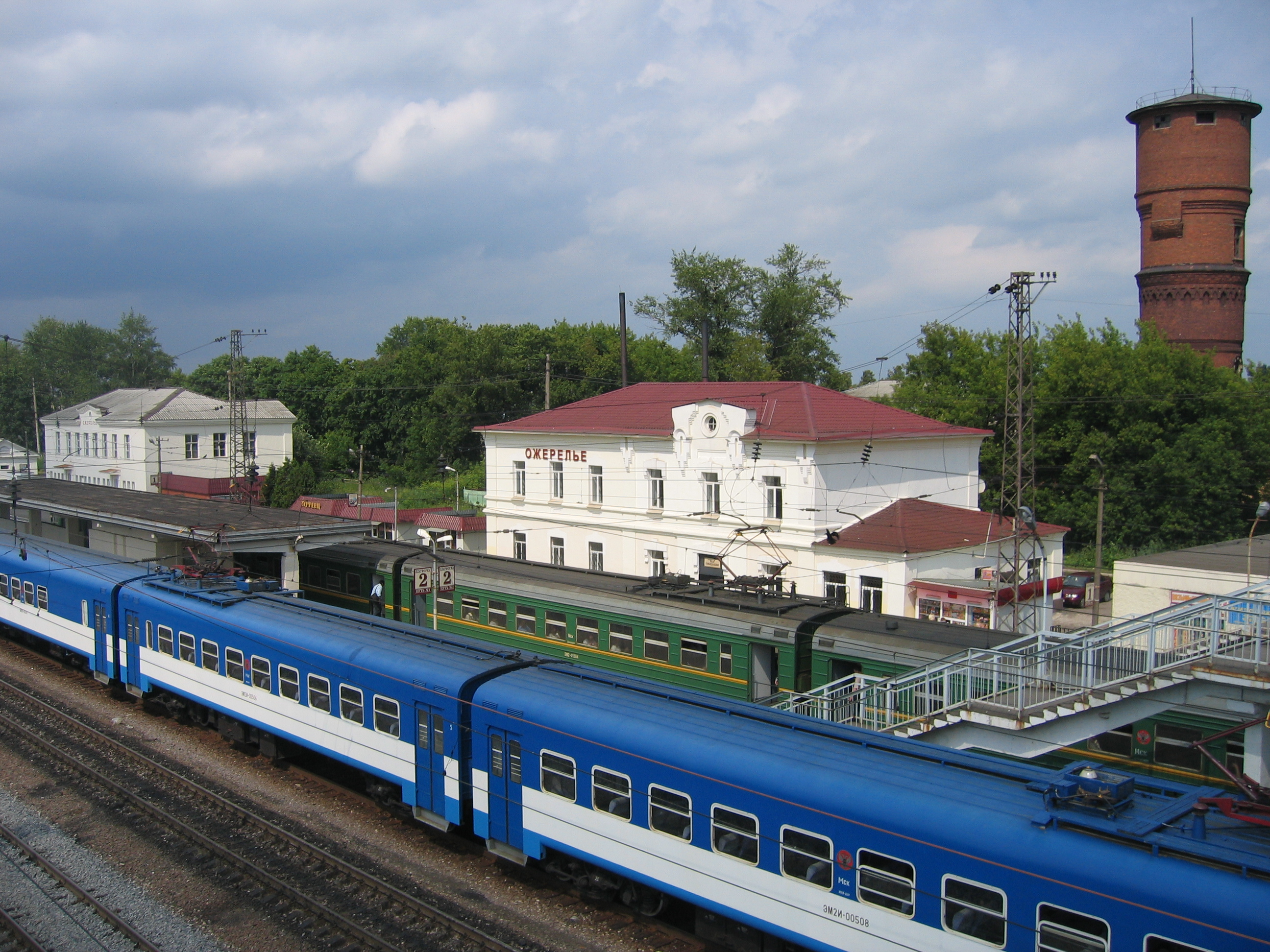
Ozherelye railway station

The town is an important railway junction.
