= Pavelets =

Pavelets Павелец
- Urban-type settlement
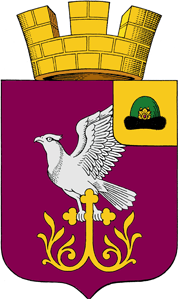
- Coat of arms
- Interactive map of Pavelets
- Location of Pavelets Pavelets (Ryazan Oblast)
- Coordinates: 53.8390°N 39.2720°E
- Country: Russia
- Federal subject: Ryazan Oblast
- Administrative district: Skopinsky District

Population (2010 Census)
  - Total: 1,963
  - Estimate (2023): 2,153 (+9.7%)
- Time zone: UTC+3 (MSK)
- Postal code: 391837
- OKTMO ID: 61644154051

Pavelets (Russian: Па́велец) is an urban locality (an urban-type settlement) in Skopinsky District of Ryazan Oblast, Russia. Population: 1,963 (2010 census); 2,207 (2002 census); 5,783 (1989 Soviet census).

== Climate ==
Climate data for Pavelets (extremes 1927-present)
Month	Jan	Feb	Mar	Apr	May	Jun	Jul	Aug	Sep	Oct	Nov	Dec	Year
Record high °C (°F)	5.1 (41.2)	8.3 (46.9)	17.7 (63.9)	29.3 (84.7)	33.0 (91.4)	36.1 (97.0)	39.4 (102.9)	39.1 (102.4)	31.8 (89.2)	24.4 (75.9)	16.9 (62.4)	8.6 (47.5)	39.4 (102.9)
Mean daily maximum °C (°F)	−5.0 (23.0)	−4.5 (23.9)	1.1 (34.0)	12.0 (53.6)	20.3 (68.5)	23.4 (74.1)	25.6 (78.1)	24.2 (75.6)	17.8 (64.0)	9.5 (49.1)	1.2 (34.2)	−3.5 (25.7)	10.2 (50.3)
Daily mean °C (°F)	−7.8 (18.0)	−7.7 (18.1)	−2.7 (27.1)	6.4 (43.5)	13.9 (57.0)	17.3 (63.1)	19.5 (67.1)	17.9 (64.2)	12.2 (54.0)	5.5 (41.9)	−1.4 (29.5)	−5.9 (21.4)	5.6 (42.1)
Mean daily minimum °C (°F)	−10.8 (12.6)	−11.1 (12.0)	−6.3 (20.7)	1.5 (34.7)	8.0 (46.4)	11.7 (53.1)	14.1 (57.4)	12.4 (54.3)	7.6 (45.7)	2.2 (36.0)	−3.9 (25.0)	−8.8 (16.2)	1.4 (34.5)
Record low °C (°F)	−40.4 (−40.7)	−36.5 (−33.7)	−30.6 (−23.1)	−18.1 (−0.6)	−6.0 (21.2)	0.2 (32.4)	2.6 (36.7)	0.9 (33.6)	−7.9 (17.8)	−13.6 (7.5)	−30.1 (−22.2)	−38.9 (−38.0)	−40.4 (−40.7)
Average precipitation mm (inches)	34.2 (1.35)	32.4 (1.28)	27.0 (1.06)	37.2 (1.46)	42.9 (1.69)	66.4 (2.61)	69.0 (2.72)	57.5 (2.26)	47.4 (1.87)	56.6 (2.23)	36.9 (1.45)	36.7 (1.44)	544.2 (21.42)
Source: pogoda.ru.net
