= Moscow =

Capital and most populous city of Russia

Moscow Москва
- Capital city and federal city
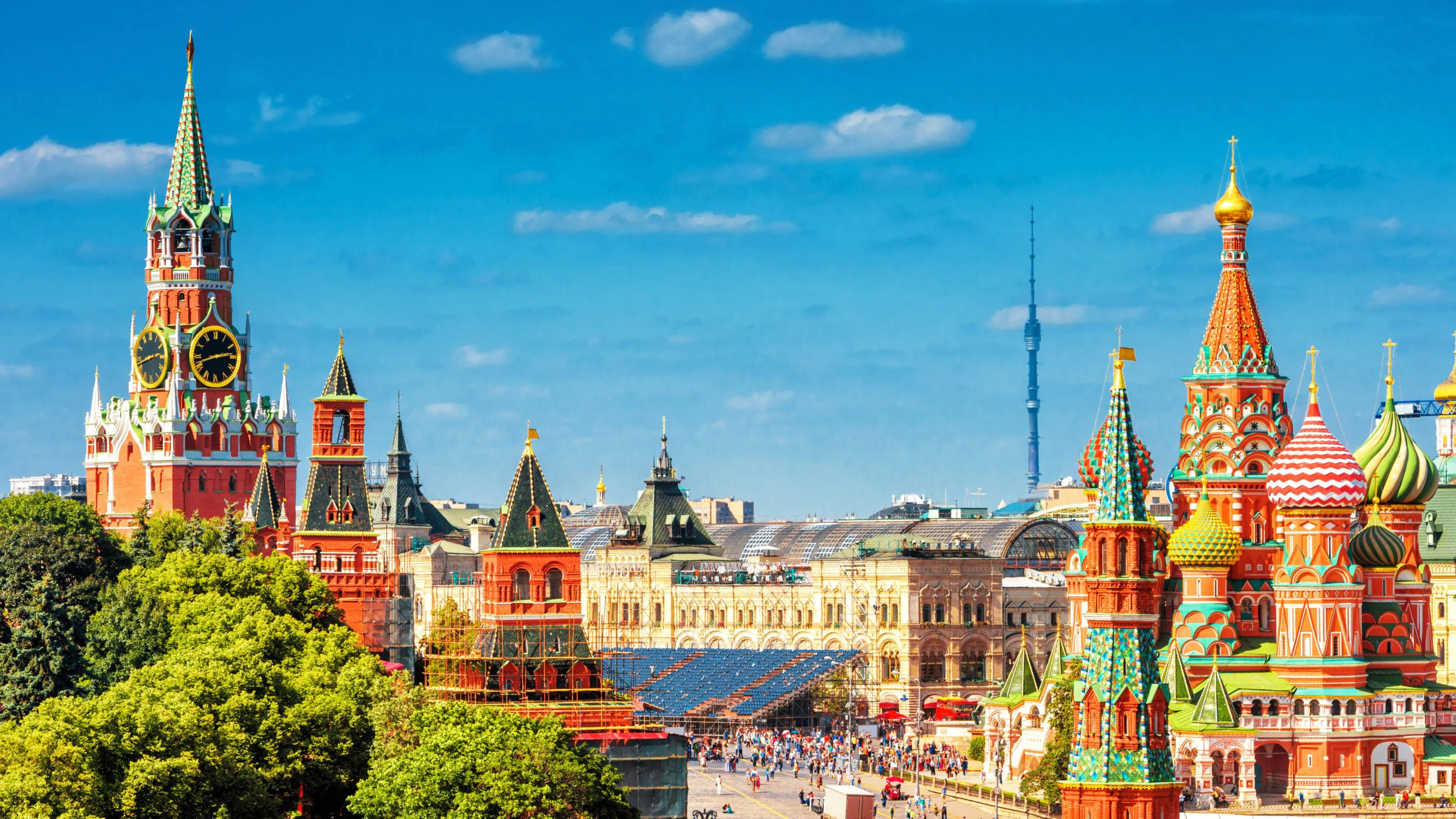
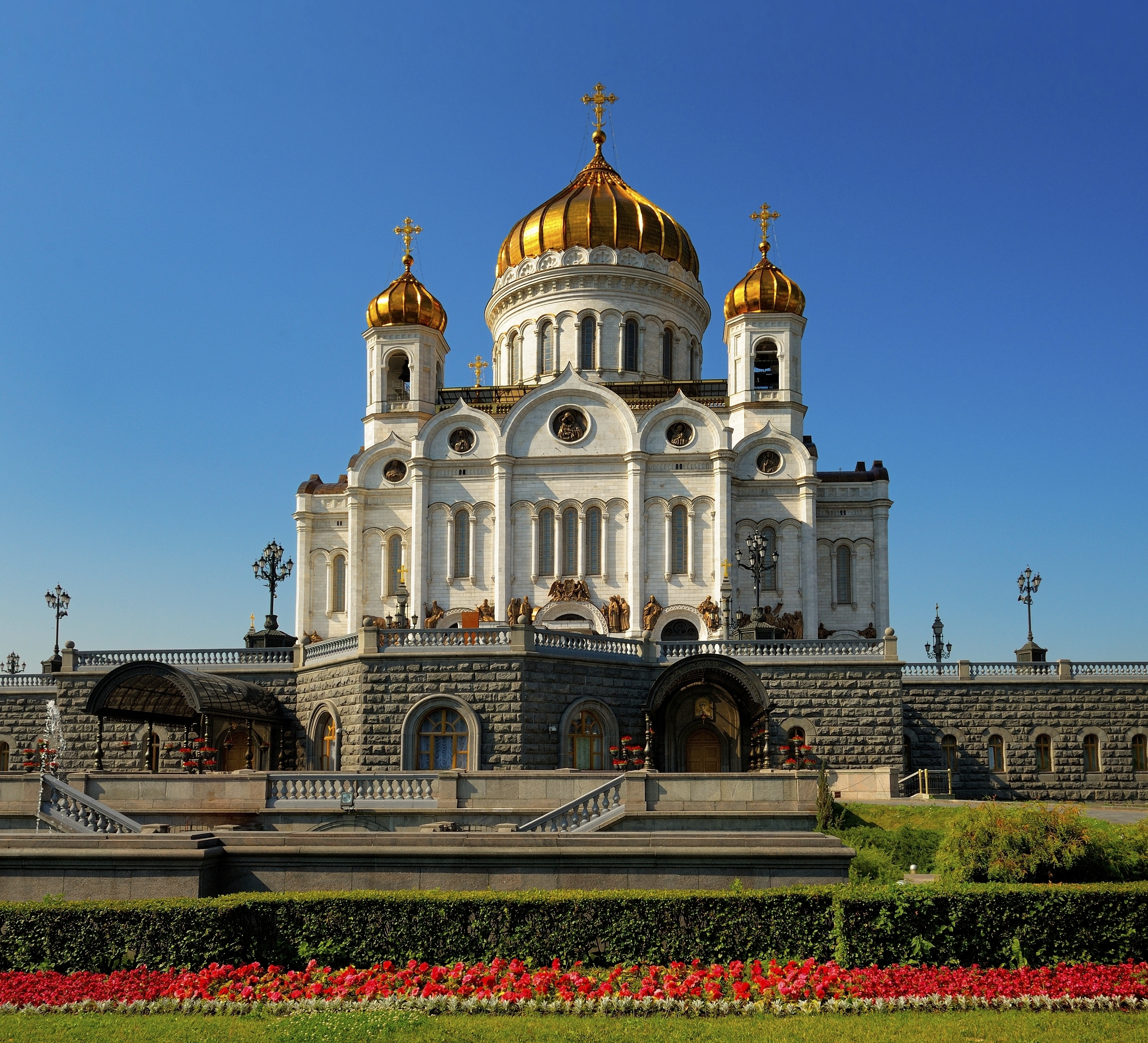
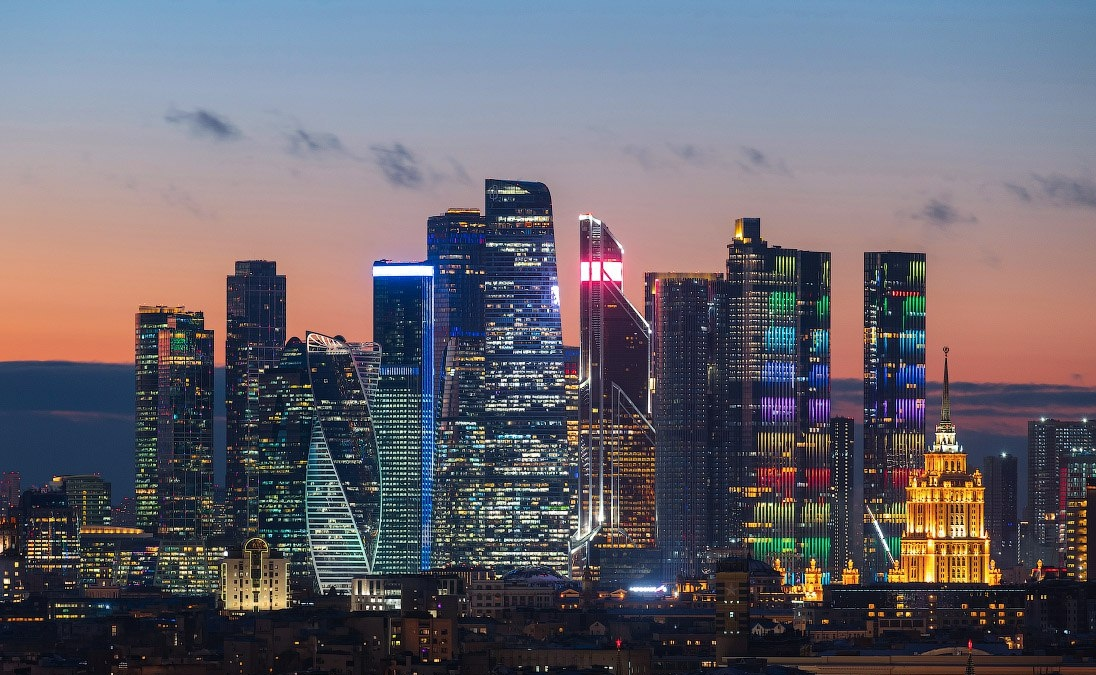
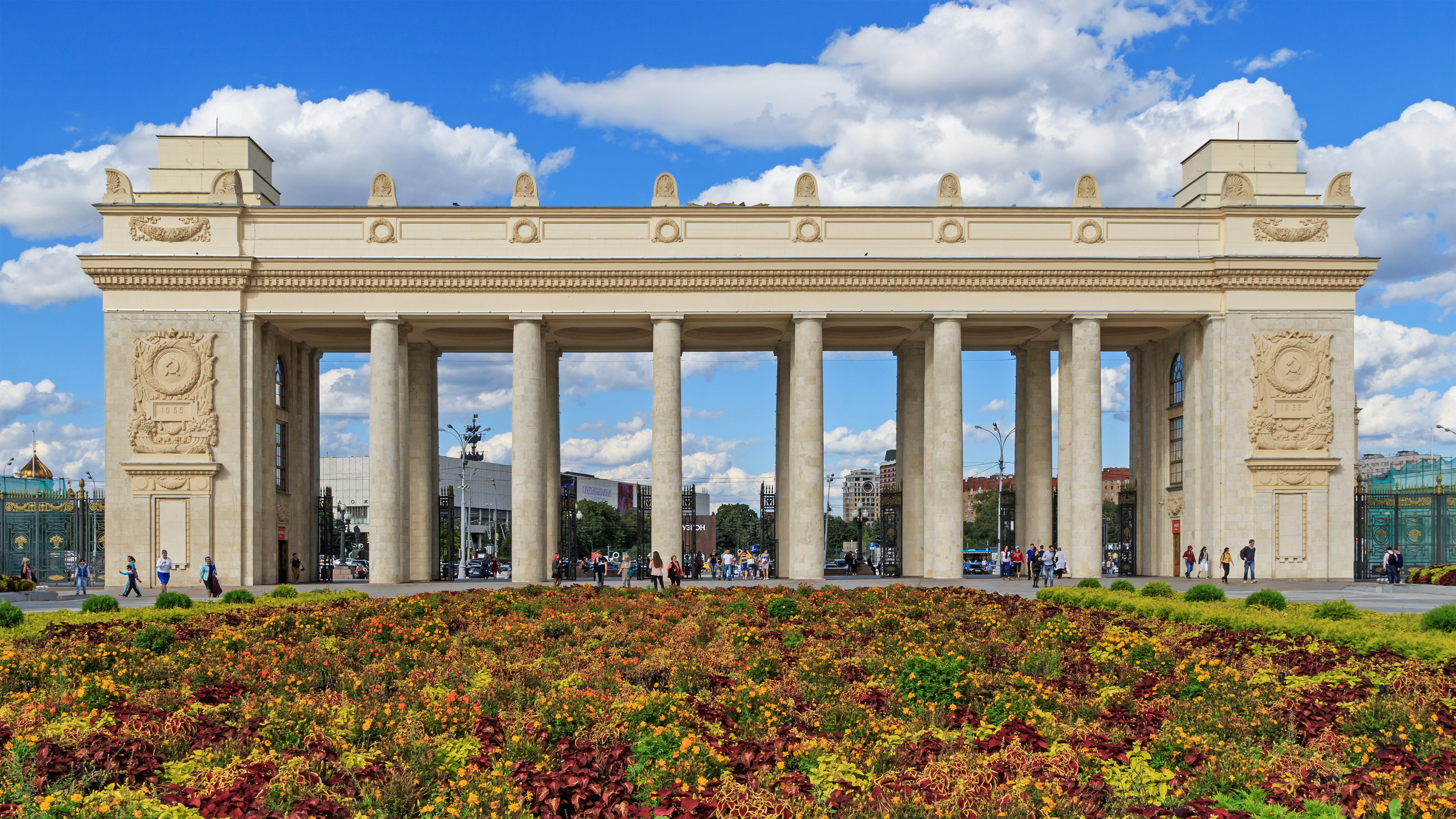
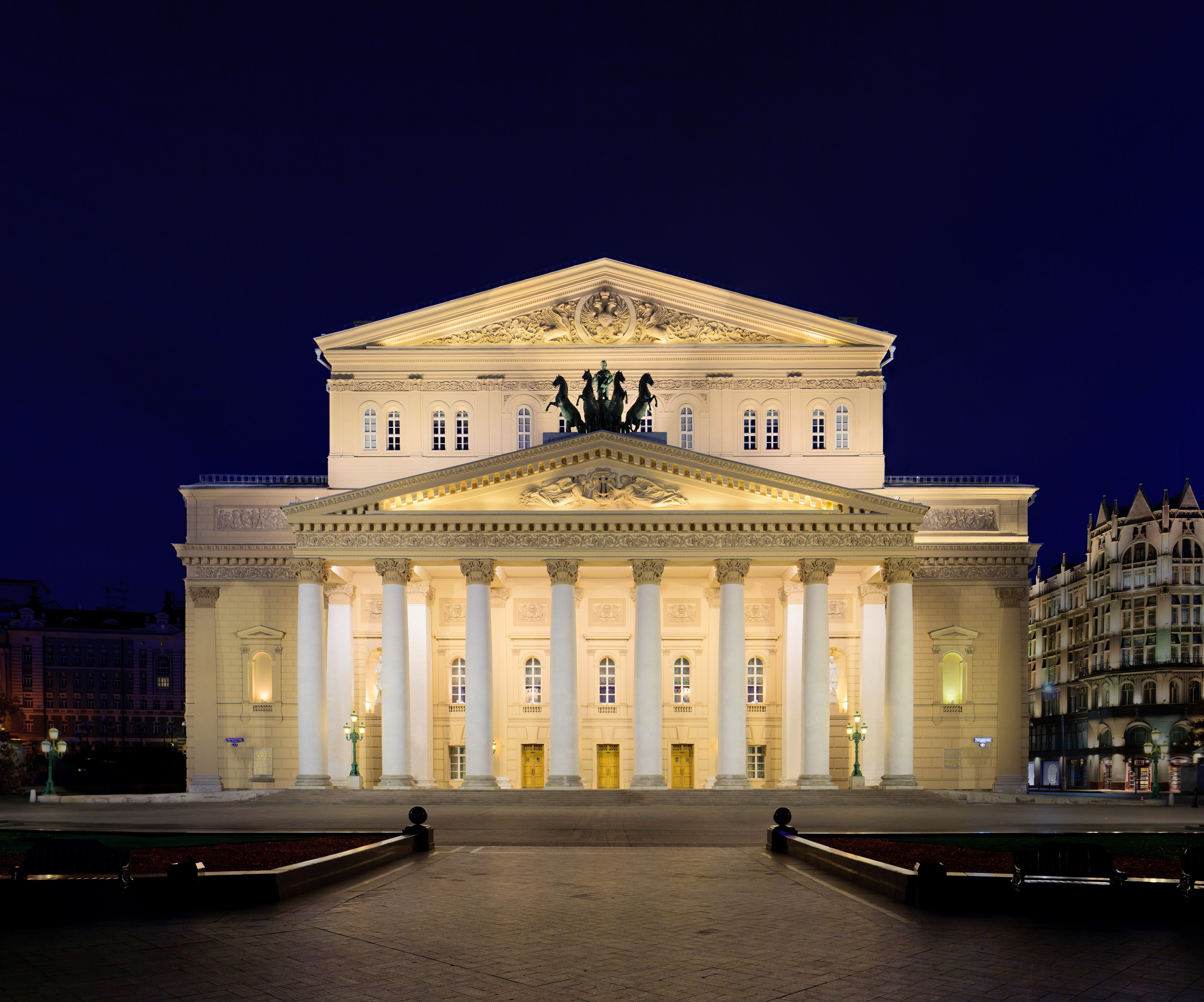
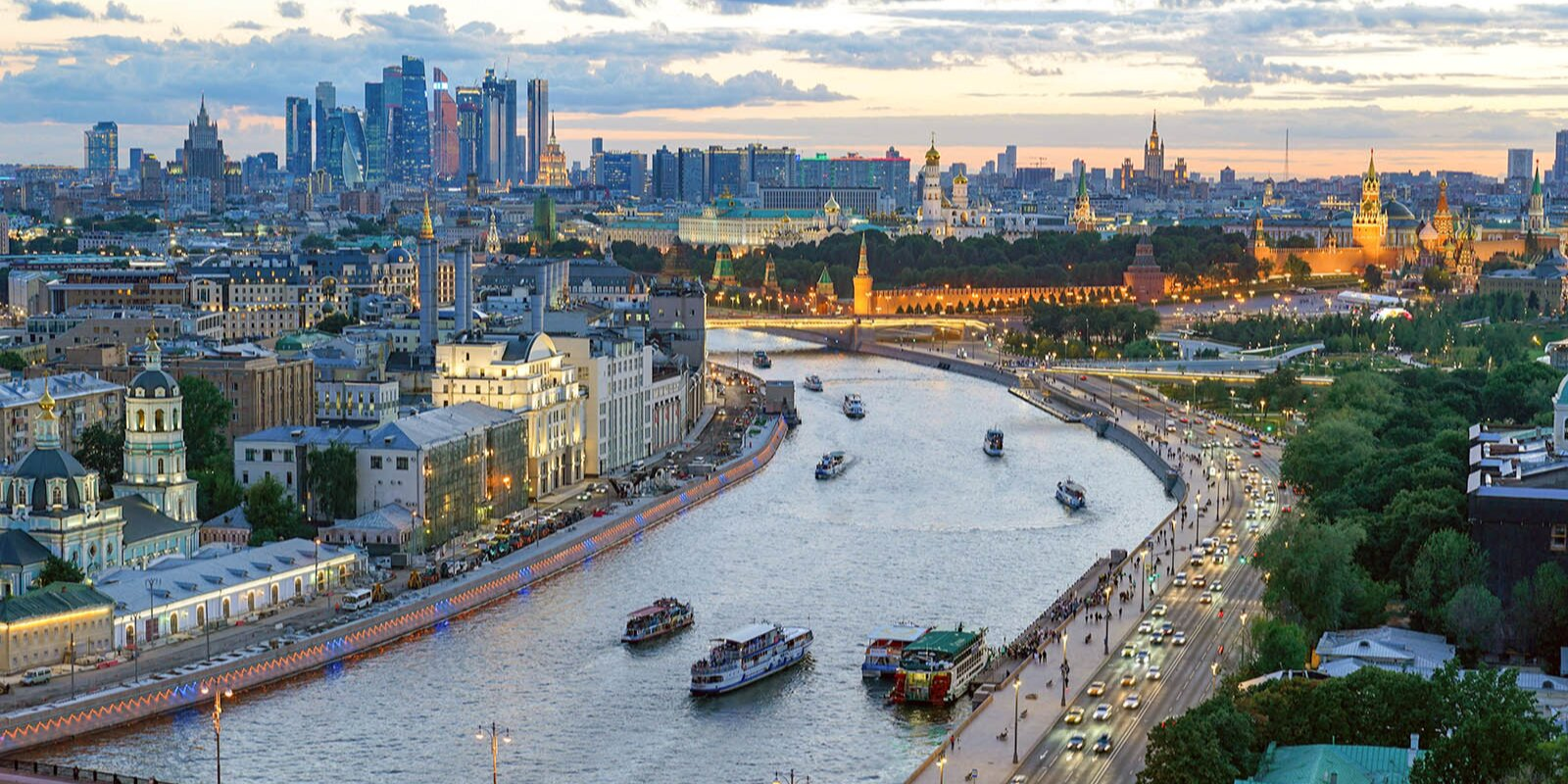
- Red Square with the Spasskaya Tower (left), Saint Basil's Cathedral (right), and Ostankino Tower (background) Cathedral of Christ the Saviour Moscow-City Gorky Park Bolshoi Theatre View along the Moskva River with the Kremlin (right) and the Moscow International Business Center (left)

- Flag Coat of arms
- Anthem: "My Moscow"
- Interactive map of Moscow
- Location within Russia Location within Europe
- Coordinates: 55°45′21″N 37°37′04″E
- Federal district: Central
- Economic region: Central
- First mentioned: 1147

Government
  - Body: City Duma
  - Mayor: Sergey Sobyanin

Area
  - Total: 2,561.5 km^{2} (989.0 sq mi)
  - Urban: 6,154 km^{2} (2,376 sq mi)
  - Metro: 48,360 km^{2} (18,670 sq mi)
- Elevation: 114–255 m (374–837 ft)

Population (2021 Census)
  - Total: ▲13,010,112
  - Rank: 1st in Russia; 2nd in Europe
  - Density: 5,080/km^{2} (13,200/sq mi)
  - Urban: ▲19,100,000
  - Urban density: 2,762/km^{2} (7,150/sq mi)
  - Metro: ▲21,534,777
  - Metro density: 450/km^{2} (1,200/sq mi)
- Demonym: Muscovite

GDP (nominal)
  - Total: ₽41 trillion (2024) (US$443.13 billion)
  - Per capita: ₽3.1 million (2024) (US$33,539.34)
- Time zone: UTC+3 (MSK)
- ISO 3166 code: RU-MOW
- Vehicle registration: 77, 177, 777; 97, 197, 797; 99, 199, 799, 977
- OKTMO ID: 45000000
- Website: mos.ru

Moscow (Note: English: /ˈmɒskoʊ/ MOS-koh, US chiefly /ˈmɒskaʊ/ MOS-kow; Russian: Москва, romanized: Moskva, IPA: [mɐˈskva].) is the capital and largest city of Russia, situated on the Moskva River in Central Russia. The city has a population estimated at more than 13 million residents within city limits, more than 19.1 million residents in the urban area, and more than 21.5 million residents in the metropolitan area. The city covers an area of 2,511 square kilometers (970 sq mi); the urban area covers 5,891 square kilometers (2,275 sq mi); and the metropolitan area covers more than 26,000 square kilometers (10,000 sq mi). Moscow is among the world's largest cities: the most populous city entirely in Europe, (Note: Istanbul, which is partially in Europe, is a larger city, with two-thirds of its population of 15 million living in Europe.) the largest urban and metropolitan areas in Europe, and the largest city by land area on the European continent.

First documented in 1147, Moscow became the capital of the Grand Principality of Moscow, which led the unification of Russian lands in the 15th century and became the center of a unified state. Following the proclamation of the Tsardom of Russia in 1547, Moscow remained the country's political and economic center for most of its history. During the reign of Peter the Great, the Russian capital was moved to the newly founded city of Saint Petersburg in 1712, leading to a decline in Moscow's importance throughout the imperial period. Following the Russian Revolution and the establishment of the Russian Soviet Federative Socialist Republic (Russian SFSR), the capital was moved back to Moscow in 1918. The city later became the political center of the Soviet Union and experienced significant population growth throughout the Soviet period. In the aftermath of the dissolution of the Soviet Union, Moscow remained the capital city of the newly reconstituted Russian Federation and has experienced continued growth.

The northernmost and coldest megacity in the world, Moscow is governed as a federal city, where it serves as the political, economic, cultural, and scientific center of Russia and Eastern Europe. Moscow has one of the world's largest urban economies. Moscow has the second-highest number of billionaires of any city (tied with Hong Kong). The Moscow International Business Center is one of the largest financial centers in the world and features the majority of Europe's tallest skyscrapers. Moscow hosted the 1980 Summer Olympics and co-hosted the 2018 FIFA World Cup.

The city contains several UNESCO World Heritage Sites and is known for its display of Russian architecture—particularly in areas such as Red Square, as well as buildings such as Saint Basil's Cathedral and the Moscow Kremlin, which serves as the seat of power of the Government of Russia. Russian companies in various industries are headquartered in Moscow, and the city is served by a comprehensive transit network; this includes four international airports, ten railway terminals, a tram system, a monorail system, and the Moscow Metro, which is the busiest metro system in Europe and one of the largest rapid transit systems in the world. More than 40% of the city's territory is covered by greenery, making it one of the greenest cities in the world.

== Etymology ==
Moscow's name is thought to be derived from that of the Moskva River. Multiple theories have been proposed for the origin of this river's name.

The linguistically best-grounded and most widely accepted theory is that the name comes from the Proto-Balto-Slavic root *mŭzg-/muzg-, from the Proto-Indo-European *meu- "wet"; thus, the name Moskva might signify a river at a wetland or marsh. The name's cognates include the following:

- Russian: музга, muzga "pool, puddle"
- Lithuanian: mazgoti and Latvian: mazgāt "to wash"
- Sanskrit: májjati "to drown"
- Latin: mergō "to dip, immerse"
- Prekmurje Slovene: müzga "marsh, swamp"

In many Slavic countries, Moskov is a surname, most commonly in Russia, Bulgaria, Ukraine, and North Macedonia. In addition, similarly named places exist in Poland, such as Mozgawa. According to a Finno-Ugric hypothesis, the Merya and Muroma people—who were among the pre-Slavic tribes that inhabited the area—called the river Mustajoki ("Black River"), and the name of the river derives from this term. Other theories, having little or no scientific basis, are rejected by linguists.

The Old Russian form of the city's name has been reconstructed as *Москы, *Mosky; hence the name was one of a few Slavic ū-stem nouns. As with other nouns of that declension, the name had been undergoing a morphological transformation during an early stage of the language's development; as a result, the first written references in the 12th century were to Московь, Moskovĭ (accusative case), Москви, Moskvi (locative case), and Москвe/Москвѣ, Moskve/Moskvě (genitive case). From the latter forms came the modern Russian form Москва, Moskva, which is a result of morphological generalization with numerous Slavic ā-stem nouns. The form Moskovĭ has left traces in other languages, including the following:

- English: Moscow
- German: Moskau
- French: Moscou
- Portuguese: Moscou, Moscovo
- Spanish: Moscú

Moscow has acquired epithets, such as the "Third Rome". It was one of 12 honorary Hero Cities in the Soviet Union. The demonym for a Moscow resident is rendered as Muscovite in English.

== History ==
=== Prehistory ===
The site of modern-day Moscow has been inhabited since prehistoric times. Among the earliest archaeological discoveries were relics of the Lyalovo culture, which experts assign to the Neolithic period. These relics confirm that the area's first inhabitants were hunters and gatherers. Around 950 AD, two Slavic tribes—Vyatichi and Krivichi—settled in the area. The Vyatichi may have formed the majority of Moscow's indigenous population.

=== Early history (1147–1263) ===
Moscow is first mentioned in chronicles in the year 1147, as part of the principality of Rostov-Suzdal, which emerged from the disintegration of Kievan Rus'. Moscow was referred to as a meeting place for Yuri Dolgorukiy and Sviatoslav Olgovich. At the time, it was a minor town on the western border of the principality. The importance of Moscow increased significantly during the second half of the 12th century, and the town was converted into a fortified gorod (stronghold) during the 1150s, when the first walls of the Kremlin were built. During the Mongol invasions of 1237–1238, Moscow was sacked following the destruction of Ryazan.

The first prince of Moscow was Daniel, the youngest son of Alexander Nevsky. In 1263, Daniel was given Moscow as an otchina (hereditary land), where he established a local branch of Rurikid princes. Two chronicles refer to Mikhail Khorobrit as "Mikhail of Moscow" during the mid-13th century, but Daniel is generally considered to be the first prince of Moscow. On Mikhail's death in 1248—if it is assumed that an appanage principality was created (as a grant to a younger child of a monarch)—Moscow reverted as an escheat (where the state takes ownership of "unowned" land) to the grand prince of Vladimir. Until 1271, the principality was ruled by the governors of Daniel's uncle Yaroslav, who was given Tver as an appanage. Daniel is first mentioned in chronicles in the year 1282, when he participated in a feudal war between his two older brothers.

=== Grand Principality (1263–1547) ===
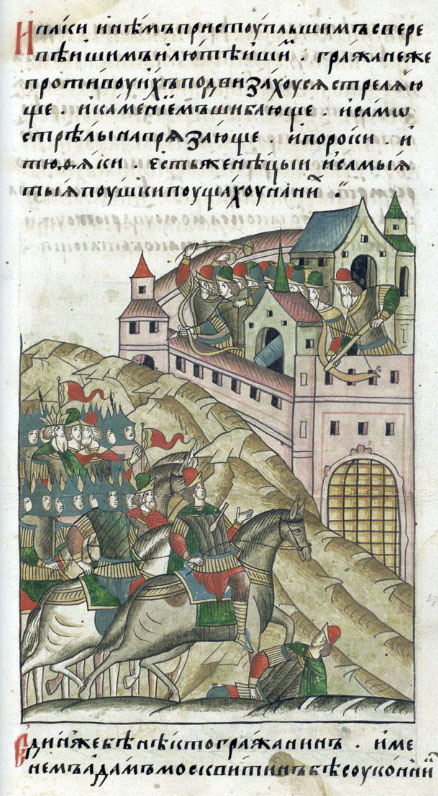
The 1382 siege of Moscow, miniature from the Illustrated Chronicle of Ivan the Terrible

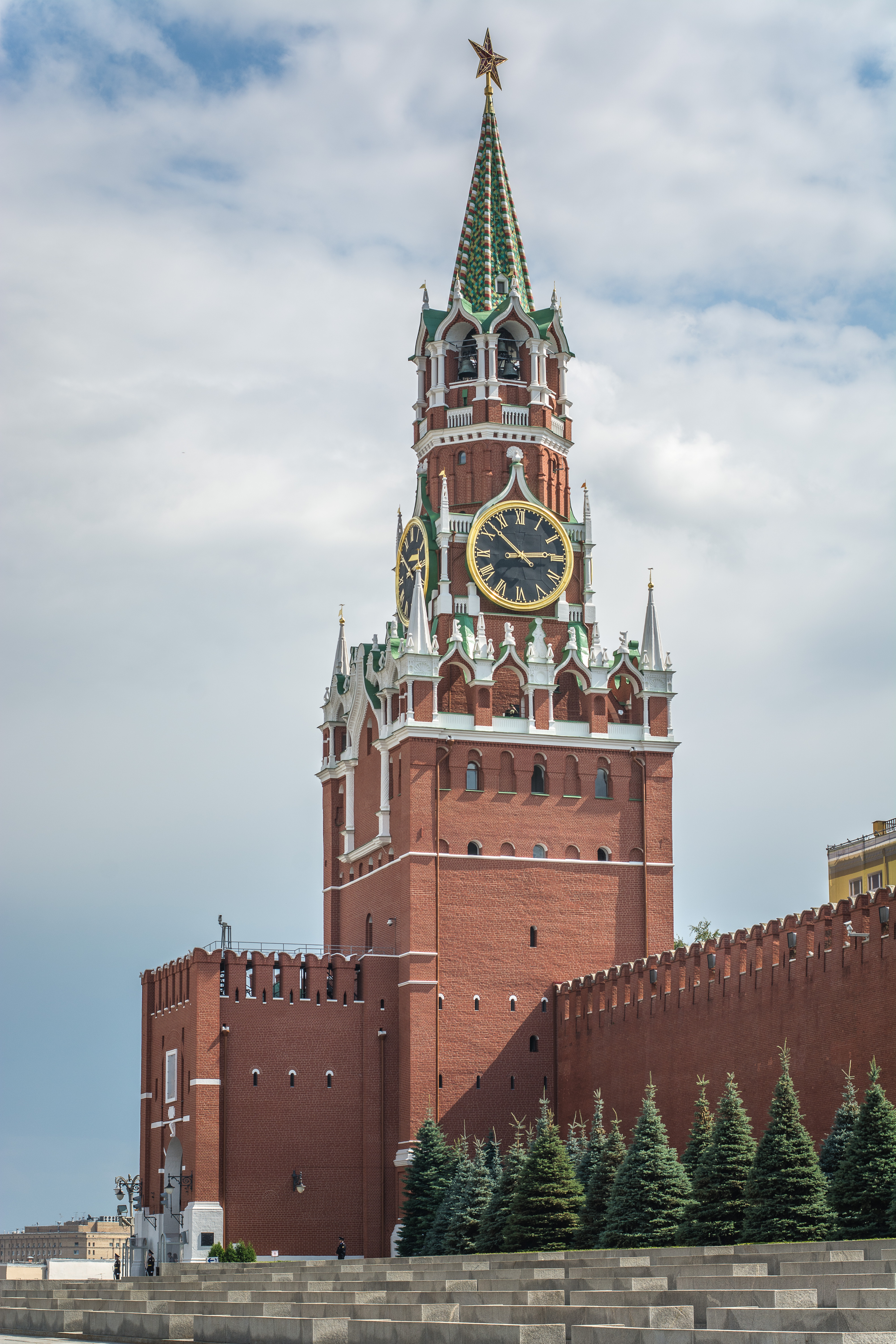
The Spasskaya Tower, built in 1491

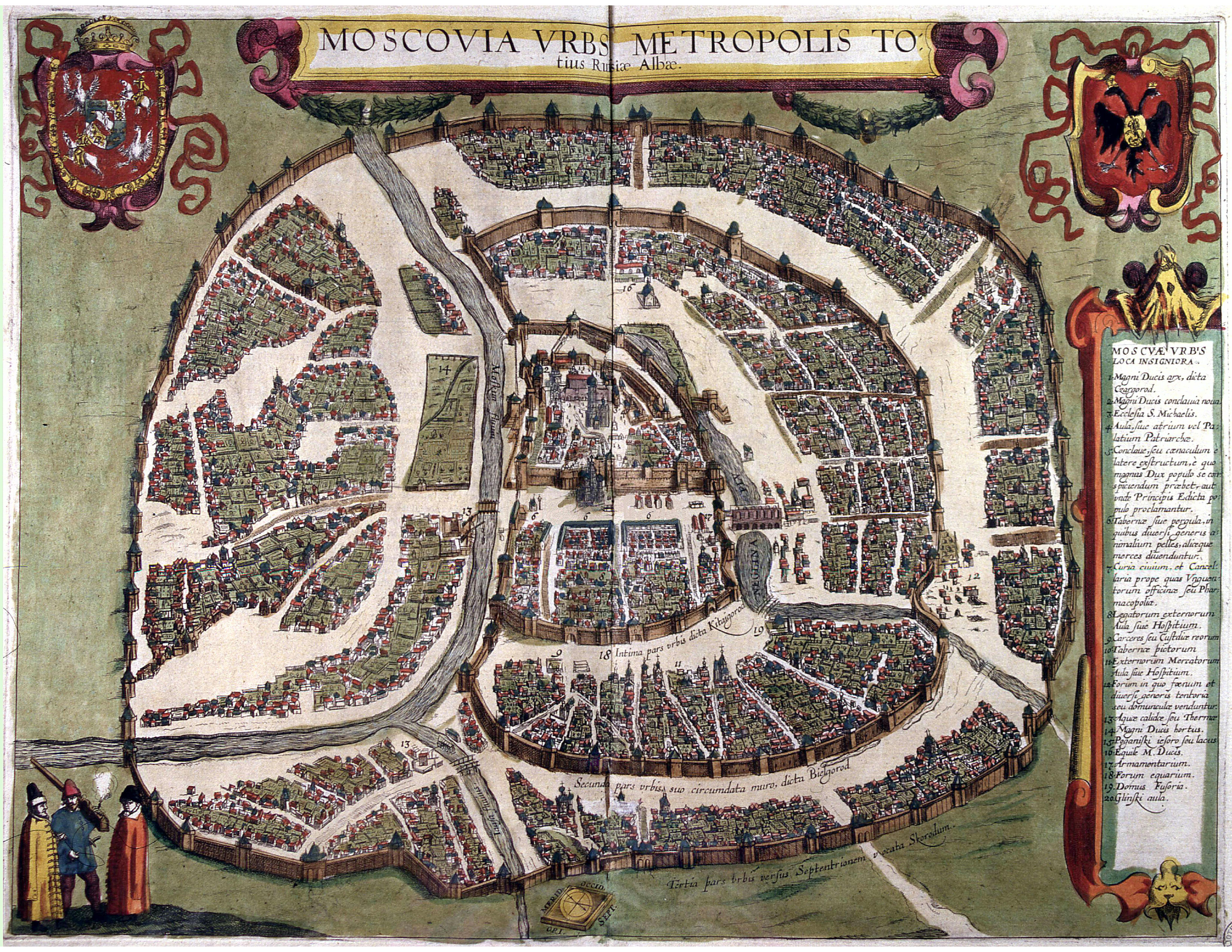
The Sigismundian Plan of Moscow (1610), before the city's destruction in 1612 and changes to streets. The north is to the right.

By 1300, Moscow was one of the leading principalities within Vladimir-Suzdal, alongside Tver. On the right bank of the Moskva River—at a distance of eight kilometers (5 mi) from the Kremlin—Daniel founded the first monastery with the wooden church of St. Daniel-Stylite, which is now the Danilov Monastery. Following Daniel's death in 1303, the territory of the principality almost tripled in size, encompassing the entire Moskva River along with its tributaries, which allowed Moscow to become self-sufficient. The principality was also provided with a river network that facilitated trade.

Daniel's descendants struggled with the princes of Tver over succession to the grand principality. Yury won recognition as the grand prince from the contemporary Mongol khan in 1318, but Yury lost the title four years later. Ivan I recovered the grand princely throne from Tver after proving himself to be a loyal servant of the khan. Ivan collected tribute for the khan of the Golden Horde from dependent Russian princes, and he used the funds that he acquired to develop Moscow. In addition, the metropolitan of the Russian Church found an ally in Ivan and moved his seat from the nominal capital of Vladimir to Moscow. The foundation of Moscow's first stone church, the Dormition Cathedral, was laid in 1326, and the metropolitan chose to be buried there—an act that confirmed Moscow's status as the spiritual center of Russian Orthodoxy. Masonry building continued in the following years with the construction of additional stone churches. The limestone walls and towers of the Kremlin were built in 1366–1368. A distinct architectural school emerged in the late 14th century.

The khan of the Golden Horde initially backed Moscow in an effort to halt the eastward expansion of the Grand Duchy of Lithuania, but he continued to meddle in Moscow's relations with other Russian princes to prevent it from becoming too strong. In 1353, the Black Death spread from northwestern Russia to Moscow, causing the deaths of ruler Simeon of Moscow, his sons, and the metropolitan. The ruling family of Moscow remained small as a result, and a new vertical pattern was defined: princely succession from father to son. During the reign of Dmitry Donskoy, the Moscow principality expanded significantly in size. In 1380, Dmitry led a united Russian army to victory over the Mongols in the Battle of Kulikovo, which increased Moscow's prestige and solidified the status of its rulers as military leaders of the nation. Following Dmitry's death in 1389, the thrones of Vladimir and Moscow were permanently united.

During the reign of Vasily II, a civil war broke out after Yury of Zvenigorod challenged the succession of his nephew in 1425. Moscow switched hands numerous times; Yury's son, Dmitry Shemyaka, continued to resist until his appanage center of Galich was captured in 1450. In ecclesiastical matters, Vasily disapproved of the Council of Florence, leading him to arrest the metropolitan when he returned in 1441 for having signed it. Seven years later, a council of Russian bishops elected their own metropolitan, which amounted to a declaration of autocephaly by the Russian Church. The fall of Constantinople in 1453 was viewed by the Russians as divine punishment for its apostasy, and in 1492, Moscow was called an imperial city for the first time by the Russian metropolitan.

During the reign of Ivan III, nearly all of the Russian states were united with Moscow, and the foundations for a centralized state were laid. In addition, Ivan's defeat of the Tatars in 1480 traditionally marks the end of Tatar suzerainty. Ivan did his utmost to make his capital a worthy successor to Constantinople; he had the Kremlin reconstructed after inviting architects from Renaissance Italy—including Petrus Antonius Solarius, who designed the new Kremlin wall and its towers; and Marco Ruffo, who designed the new palace for the prince. The current Kremlin walls were designed by Solarius and completed in 1495. The Ivan the Great Bell Tower was built in 1505–1508 and augmented to its current height in 1600. A trading settlement (or posad) developed east of the Kremlin, in the area known as Zaradye. During the time of Ivan III, the Red Square appeared, originally called the "Hollow Field".

Ivan's son Vasily III continued the expansion of the Muscovite state and annexed the remaining Russian territories. His reign also saw the continued development of the doctrine of Moscow as the "Third Rome". In 1508–1516, the Italian architect Aleviz Fryazin (Novy) arranged to construct a moat in front of the eastern wall, which would connect the Moskva and Neglinnaya Rivers, and be filled with water from the Neglinnaya. Known as the Alevizov moat, it had a length of 541 meters (1,775 feet), a width of 36 meters (118 feet), and a depth of 9.5 to 13 meters (31–43 feet). This moat was lined with limestone; in 1533, it was fenced on both sides with low, four-meter-thick (13-foot) cogged-brick walls.

=== Tsardom (1547–1721) ===
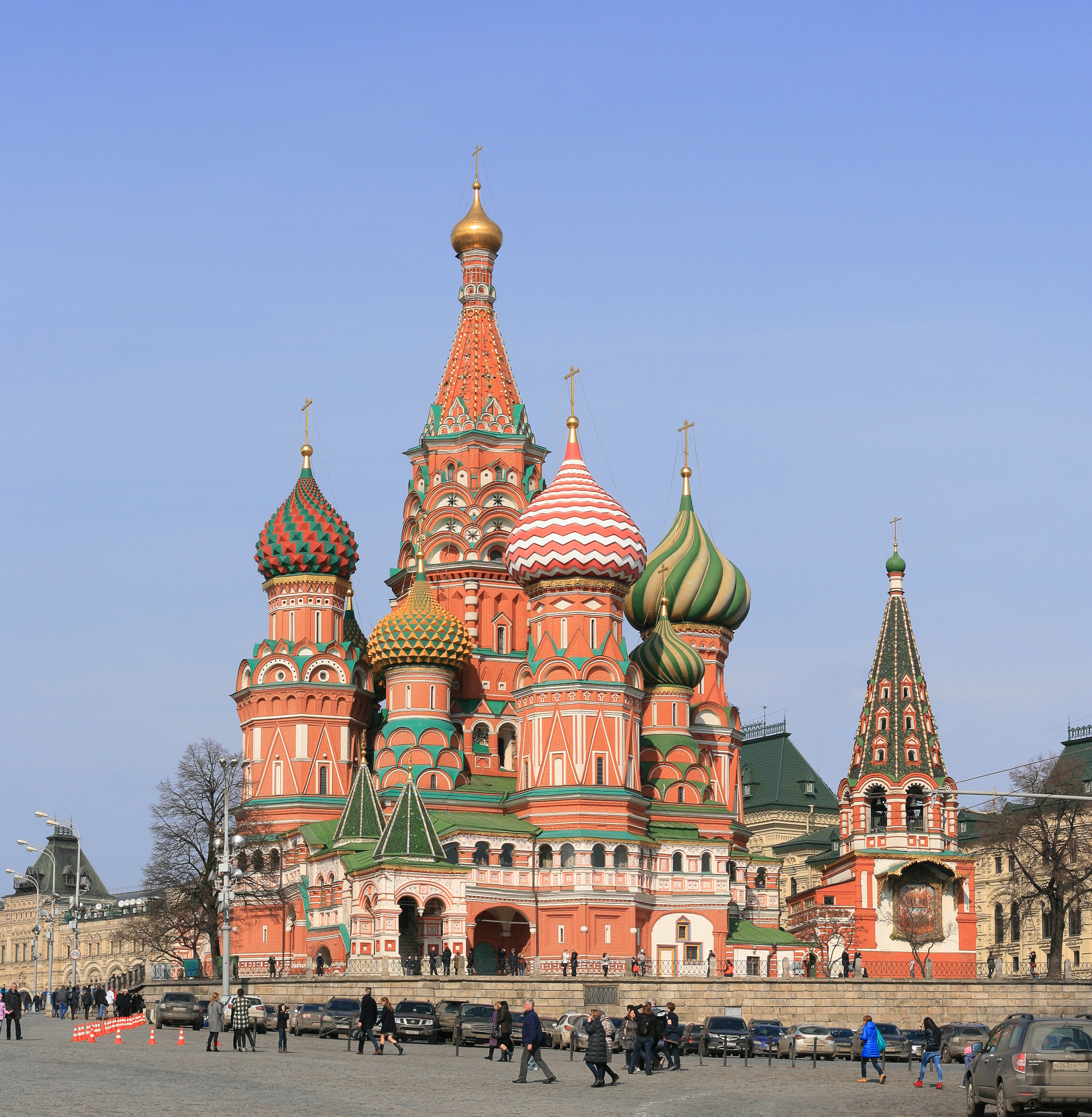
Saint Basil's Cathedral, built in 1561

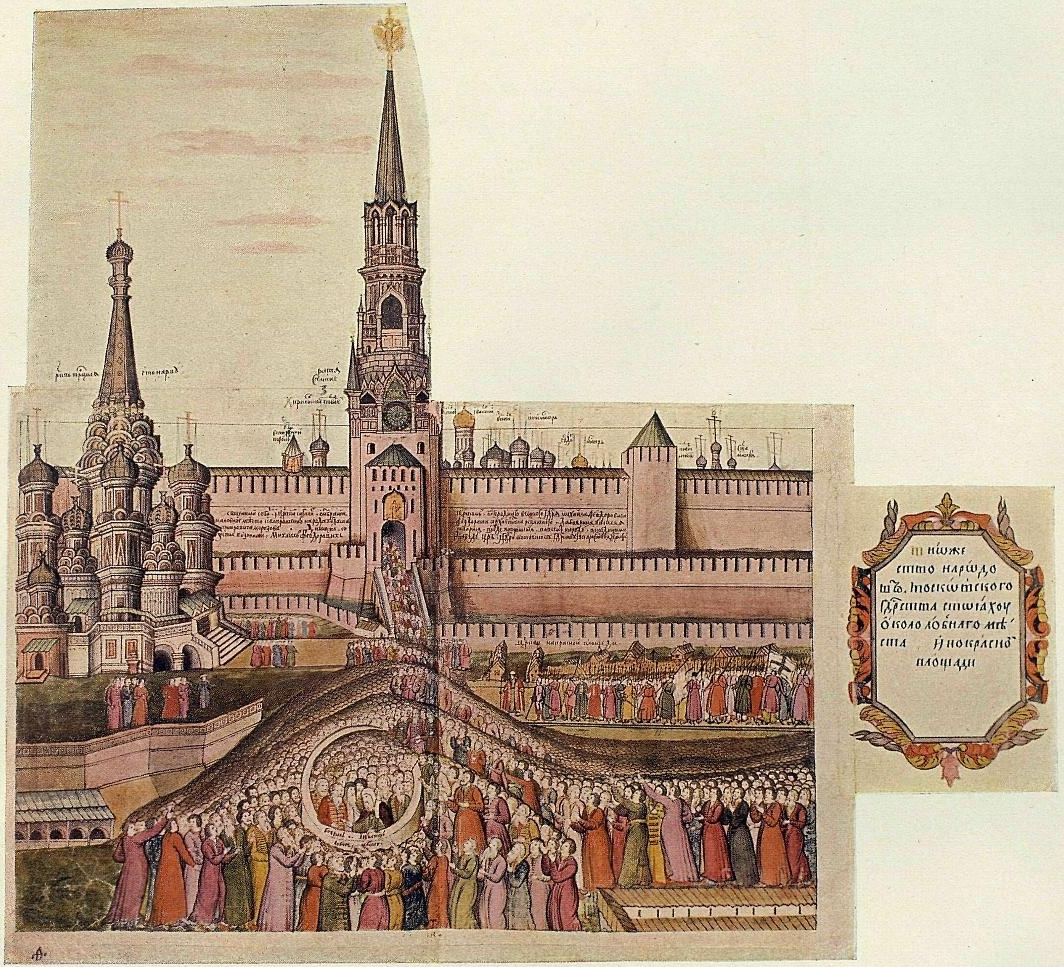
The election of Michael I as tsar in 1613

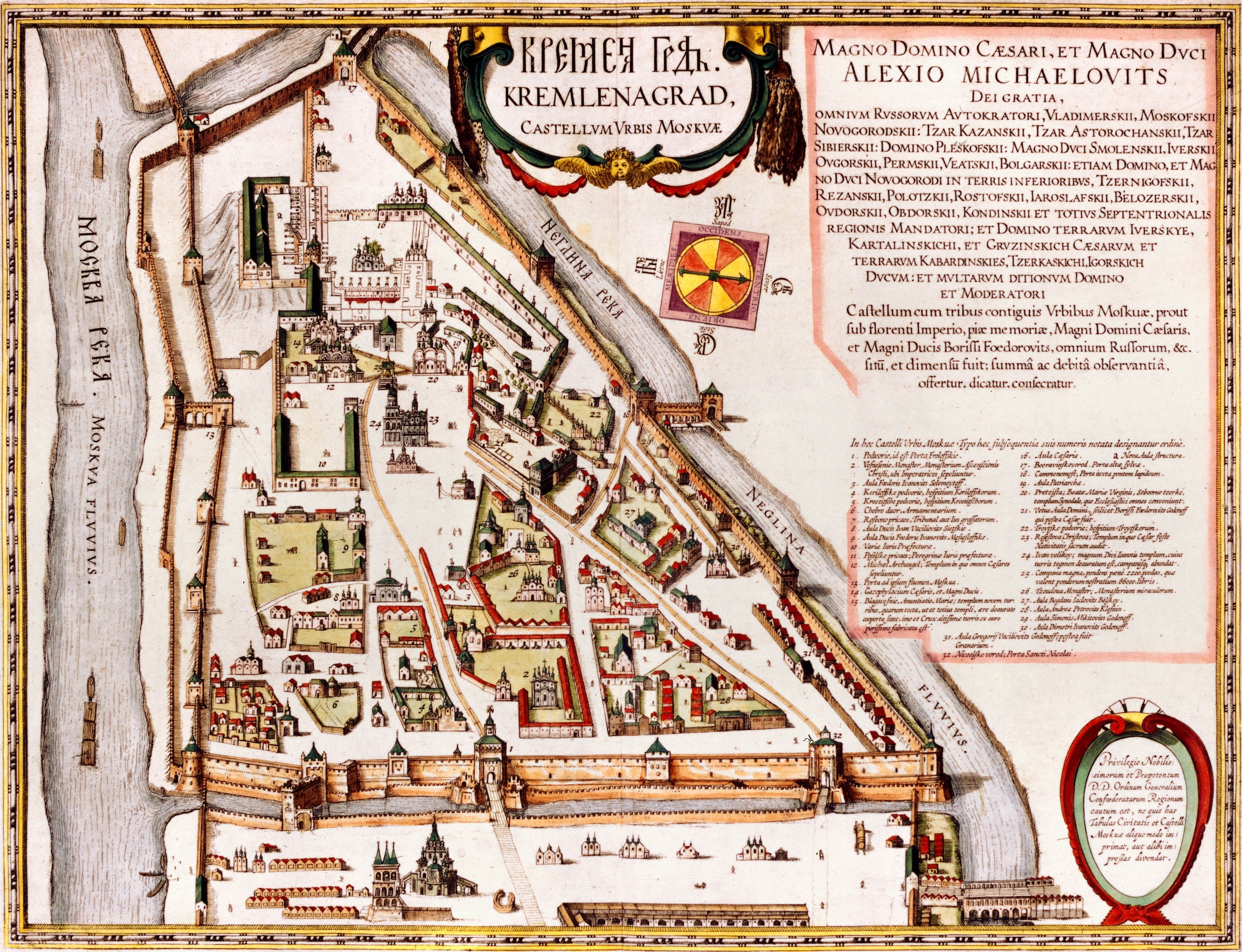
The Kremlin during the reign of Alexis of Russia, 1663

In 1547, Ivan the Terrible was crowned in Moscow as not only the grand prince, but also the first tsar of all Russia. During the 16th and 17th centuries, three circular defenses were built around the town: Kitay-gorod, the White City, and the Earthen City. However, in 1547, fires destroyed much of the town, and in 1571 the Crimean Tatars captured Moscow, burning everything except the Kremlin. The annals record that only 30,000 of 200,000 inhabitants survived.

The Crimean Tatars attacked again in 1591, but they were held back by new defensive walls, built between 1584 and 1591 by a craftsman named Fyodor Kon. In 1592, an outer earth rampart with 50 towers was erected around the city, including an area on the right bank of the Moscow River. As an outermost line of defense, a chain of strongly fortified monasteries was established beyond the ramparts to the south and east—principally the Novodevichy Convent and the Donskoy, Danilov, Simonov, Novospasskiy, and Andronikov monasteries, most of which now house museums. Because of its ramparts, the city became known poetically as Bielokamennaya, the "White-Walled". The city limits, as marked by those ramparts, are marked by the Garden Ring in contemporary Moscow. Three square gates existed on the east side of the Kremlin wall, which in the 17th century were known as Konstantino-Eleninsky, Spassky, and Nikolsky (after the icons of Constantine and Helen, the Savior, and St. Nicholas that hung over those gates). The last two gates were directly opposite the Red Square, while the Konstantino-Eleninsky gate was located behind Saint Basil's Cathedral.

The Russian famine of 1601–1603 killed possibly 100,000 people in Moscow. Between 1610 and 1612, troops of the Polish–Lithuanian Commonwealth occupied Moscow, as its ruler Sigismund III tried to take the Russian throne. In 1612, Nizhny Novgorod and other Russian cities, led by prince Dmitry Pozharsky and Kuzma Minin, rose against the Polish occupants, besieged the Kremlin, and expelled them. In 1613, the Zemsky Sobor (lit. 'assembly of the land'; parliament) elected Michael Romanov as tsar, establishing the Romanov dynasty. The 17th century witnessed several uprisings—such as the liberation of Moscow from Polish–Lithuanian invaders (1612), the Salt Riot (1648), the Copper Riot (1662), and the Moscow uprising of 1682.

During the first half of the 17th century, Moscow's population doubled from 100,000 to 200,000, and it expanded beyond its ramparts in the latter part of the century. In the middle of the 17th century, 20% of Moscow suburban inhabitants came from the Grand Duchy of Lithuania, having been driven from their homeland by Muscovite invaders. By 1682, 692 households were established north of the ramparts—by Ukrainians and Belarusians abducted from their hometowns during the Russo-Polish War of 1654–1667. These new outskirts became known as the Meshchanskaya sloboda (settlement), after the Ruthenian term meshchane meaning "town people". This term acquired a pejorative connotation in 18th-century Russia, and it currently means "petty bourgeois" or "narrow-minded philistine". The entire city of the late 17th century is contained within contemporary Moscow's Central Administrative Okrug.

Numerous disasters befell the city during this period. Plague epidemics ravaged Moscow in 1570–1571, 1592, and 1654–1656. The plague killed more than 80% of the population in 1654–1655. Fires burned down much of the wooden city in 1626 and 1648. In 1712, Peter the Great moved his government to the newly built city of Saint Petersburg on the coast of the Baltic Sea.

=== Empire (1721–1917) ===
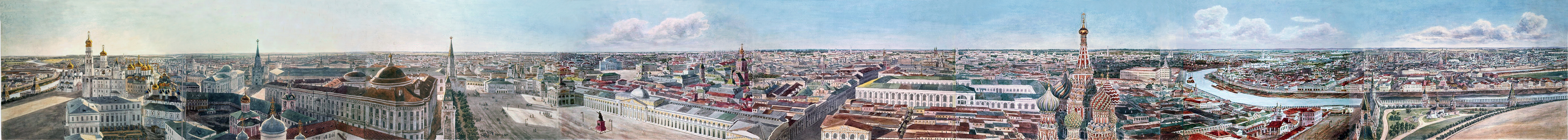
A panoramic view of Moscow from the Spasskaya Tower in 1819–1823

After losing its status as capital, Moscow's population initially decreased—from 200,000 in the 17th century to 130,000 in 1750. However, after 1750, the population grew tenfold over the remaining duration of the Russian Empire, reaching 1.8 million by 1915. The 1770–1772 Russian plague killed up to 100,000 people in Moscow. By 1700, the construction of cobbled roads had begun. In 1730, permanent street lights were introduced, and by 1867 many streets had a gaslight. In 1883, near the Prechistinskiye Gates, arc lamps were installed. In 1741, Moscow was surrounded by a barricade 40 kilometers (25 mi) long, the Kamer-Kollezhskiy barrier, with 16 gates where customs tolls were collected. The barrier's line is traced in contemporary Moscow by several streets called val ("ramparts"). In the early 19th century, the Arch of Konstantino-Eleninsky Gate was paved with bricks; however, the Spassky Gate was the primary front gate of the Kremlin and was used for royal entrances. From this gate, wooden and stone bridges stretched across the moat. Books were sold on this bridge, and stone platforms were built nearby for guns—"raskats". The Tsar Cannon was located on the Lobnoye mesto platform. The road connecting Moscow with Saint Petersburg—the M10 highway in contemporary Russia—was completed in 1746; the road's Moscow end followed the old Tver road, which had existed since the 16th century. The road became known as Peterburskoye Schosse after being paved in the 1780s. Petrovsky Palace was built in 1776–1780 by architect Matvey Kazakov. Between 1781 and 1804, the Mytischinskiy water pipe (the first in Russia) was built.

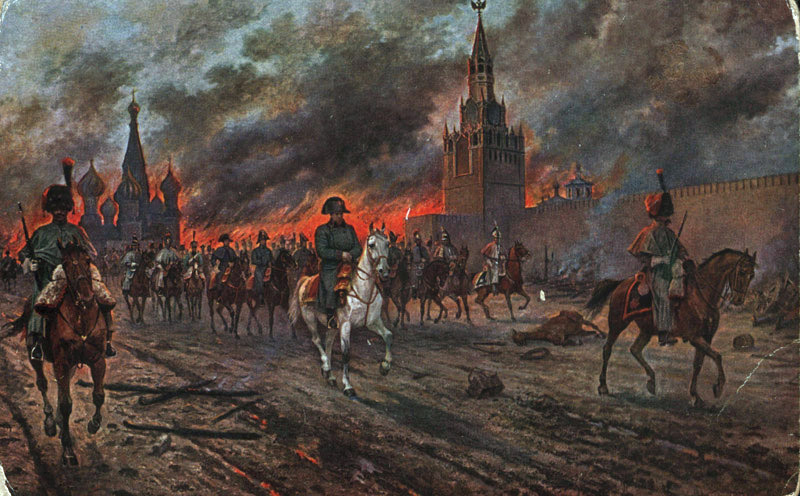
Napoleon retreating during the Fire of Moscow, after the failed French invasion

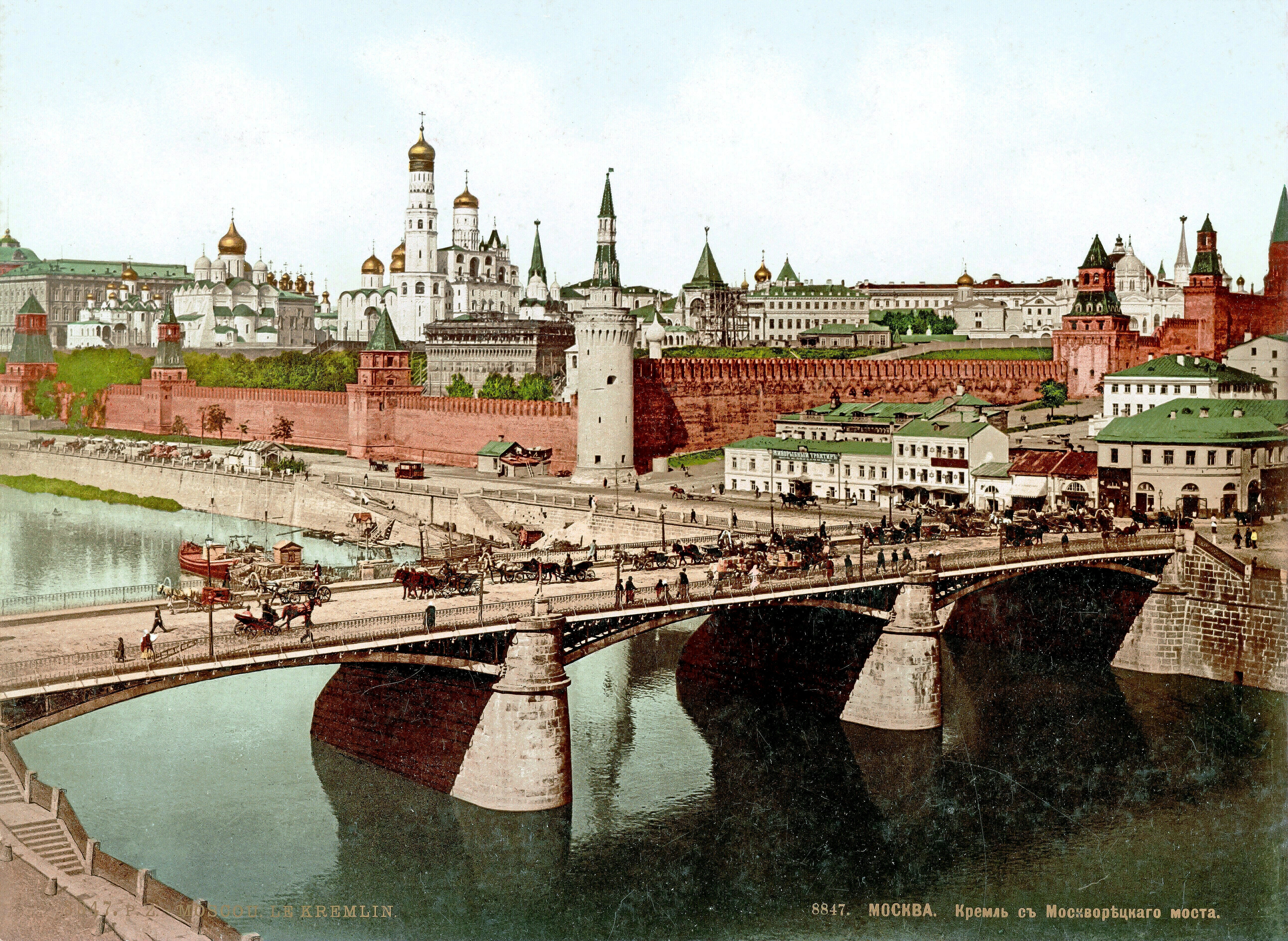
Moskva River in the 19th century

When Napoleon invaded Russia in 1812, Muscovites were evacuated. The Moscow fire was principally the effect of Russian sabotage. Napoleon's Grande Armée (lit. 'Great Army') was forced to retreat and was nearly annihilated by the devastating Russian winter. In 1813, following the city's destruction during the French occupation, the Commission for the Construction of the City of Moscow was established. This commission launched a major program of rebuilding, including a partial replanning of the city center. Among many buildings constructed or reconstructed during this time were the Grand Kremlin Palace and the Kremlin Armoury, the Moscow University, the Moscow Manege (Riding School), and the Bolshoi Theatre. Arbat Street had been in existence since the 15th century or earlier, but this street developed into a prestigious area during the 18th century. The street was destroyed in the fire of 1812 and was rebuilt completely in the early 19th century. Moscow State University was established in 1755. Its main building was reconstructed after the 1812 fire by architect Domenico Giliardi. The Moskovskiye Vedomosti newspaper appeared in 1756, originally at weekly intervals, and from 1859 onward as a daily newspaper.

During the 1830s, general Alexander Bashilov planned the first regular grid of city streets north of Petrovsky Palace. Khodynka field, south of the highway, was used for military training. Smolensky Rail station (the forerunner of the Belorussky Rail Terminal) was inaugurated in 1870. Sokolniki Park—in the 18th century, the home of the tsar's falconers well outside Moscow—became contiguous with the expanding city during the later 19th century and was developed into a municipal park in 1878. The suburban Savyolovsky Rail Terminal was built in 1902. In January 1905, the institution of the City Governor, or Mayor, was officially introduced; Alexander Adrianov became Moscow's first official mayor.

When Catherine II assumed power in 1762, observers depicted the city's filth and the smell of sewage as symptoms of the disorderly lifestyles of lower-class Russians recently arrived from the farms. Elites called for improved sanitation, which became part of Catherine's plans for increased control over social life. National political and military successes from 1812 through 1855 calmed her critics and validated efforts to produce a more enlightened and stable society. The poor state of public health was discussed less often. However, in the wake of Russia's failures in the Crimean War in 1855–1856, confidence in the state's ability to maintain order in the slums eroded; therefore, demands for improved public health put this issue back on the public agenda. In 1903, the Moskvoretskaya water supply was completed.

=== Soviet period (1917–1991) ===
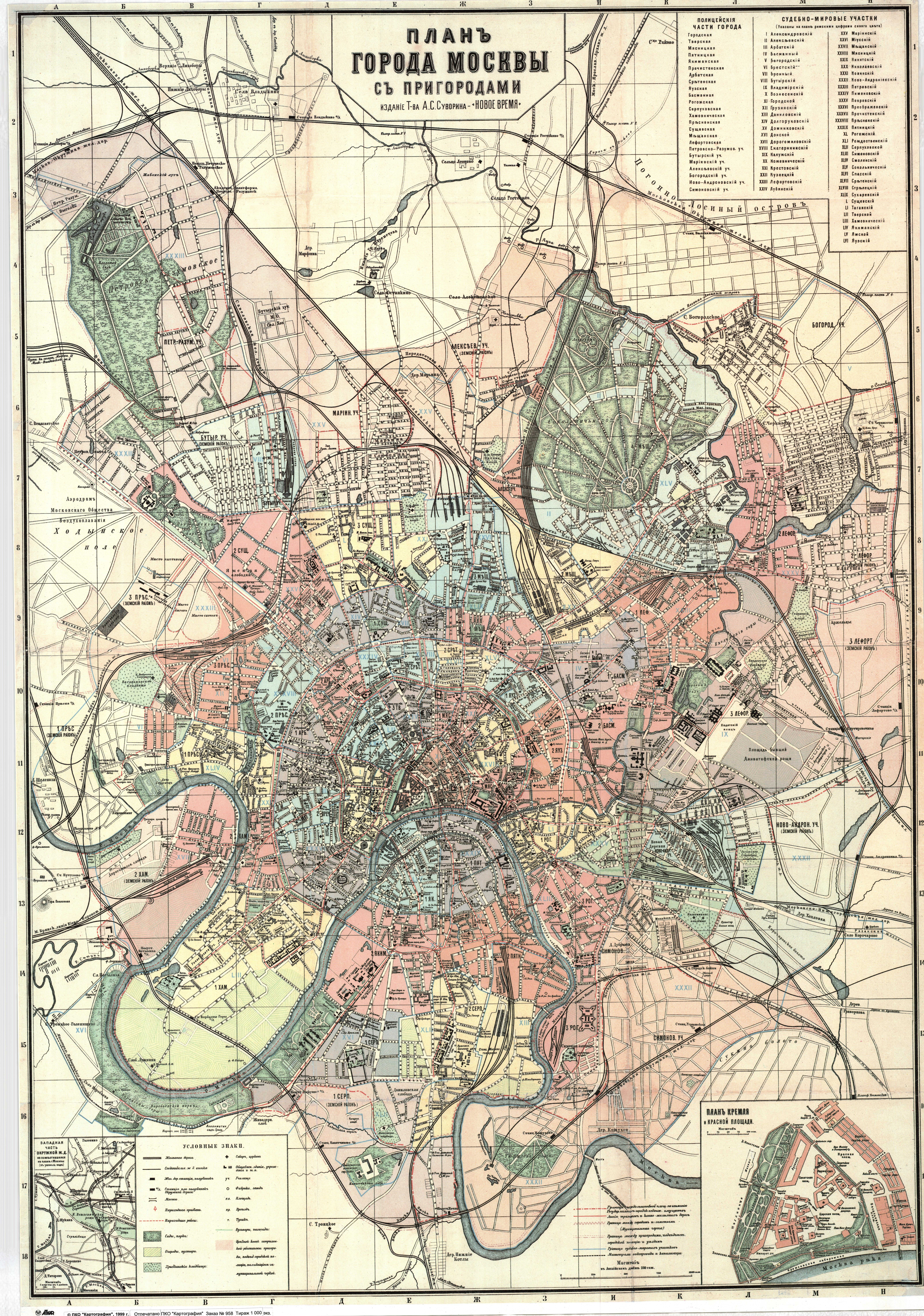
City plan of Moscow, 1917

In November 1917, after learning of the uprising in Petrograd (now called Saint Petersburg), Moscow's Bolsheviks started an uprising. On 2 November [O.S. 15 November] 1917, after heavy fighting, Soviet power was established in Moscow. Vladimir Lenin, fearing invasion, moved the state's capital back to Moscow on 12 March 1918. The Kremlin once again became the seat of power, the political center of the new state.

With the change in societal values imposed by communist ideology, the tradition of preserving cultural heritage was broken. Independent preservation societies, even those that defended only secular landmarks, were disbanded by the end of the 1920s. A new anti-religious campaign, launched in 1929, coincided with the collectivization of peasants; the destruction of churches in cities peaked around 1932. In 1937, letters were written to the Central Committee of the Communist Party of the Soviet Union to rename Moscow to "Stalindar" or "Stalinodar". Stalin rejected this suggestion.

During World War II, the State Defense Committee and the General Staff of the Red Army were located in Moscow. In 1941, 16 divisions of the national volunteers (more than 160,000 people), 25 battalions, and 4 engineering regiments were formed among Muscovites. Between October 1941 and January 1942, the German Army Group Centre was stopped at the outskirts of the city, and then repelled in the Battle of Moscow. Many factories were evacuated, together with much of the government, and from 20 October the city was declared to be under siege. Its remaining inhabitants built and manned anti-tank defenses, while the city was bombarded from the air. On 1 May 1944, a Medal "For the Defence of Moscow" was instituted; in 1947, a Medal "In Commemoration of the 800th Anniversary of Moscow" was instituted. German and Soviet casualties during the battle have been debated, as sources provide different estimates. Total casualties between 30 September 1941 and 7 January 1942 are estimated at 248,000–400,000 for the Wehrmacht and 650,000–1,280,000 for the Red Army.

External videos
- Stalin's Moscow in 1953

During the postwar years, Moscow experienced a housing crisis, which was solved by the innovation of high-rise apartments. There are more than 11,000 such standardised and prefabricated apartment blocks, housing most of Moscow's population—thus, it is by far the country's leading city for high-rise buildings. Apartments were built and partly furnished in factories, before being raised and stacked into tall columns. The popular Soviet-era comedy film Irony of Fate parodies this construction method. The city of Zelenograd was built in 1958, 37 kilometers (23 mi) northwest of the city center—along with the Leningradskoye Shosse (the M10 highway in contemporary Russia)—and incorporated as one of Moscow's administrative okrugs (divisions). Moscow State University relocated to its campus on Sparrow Hills in 1953.

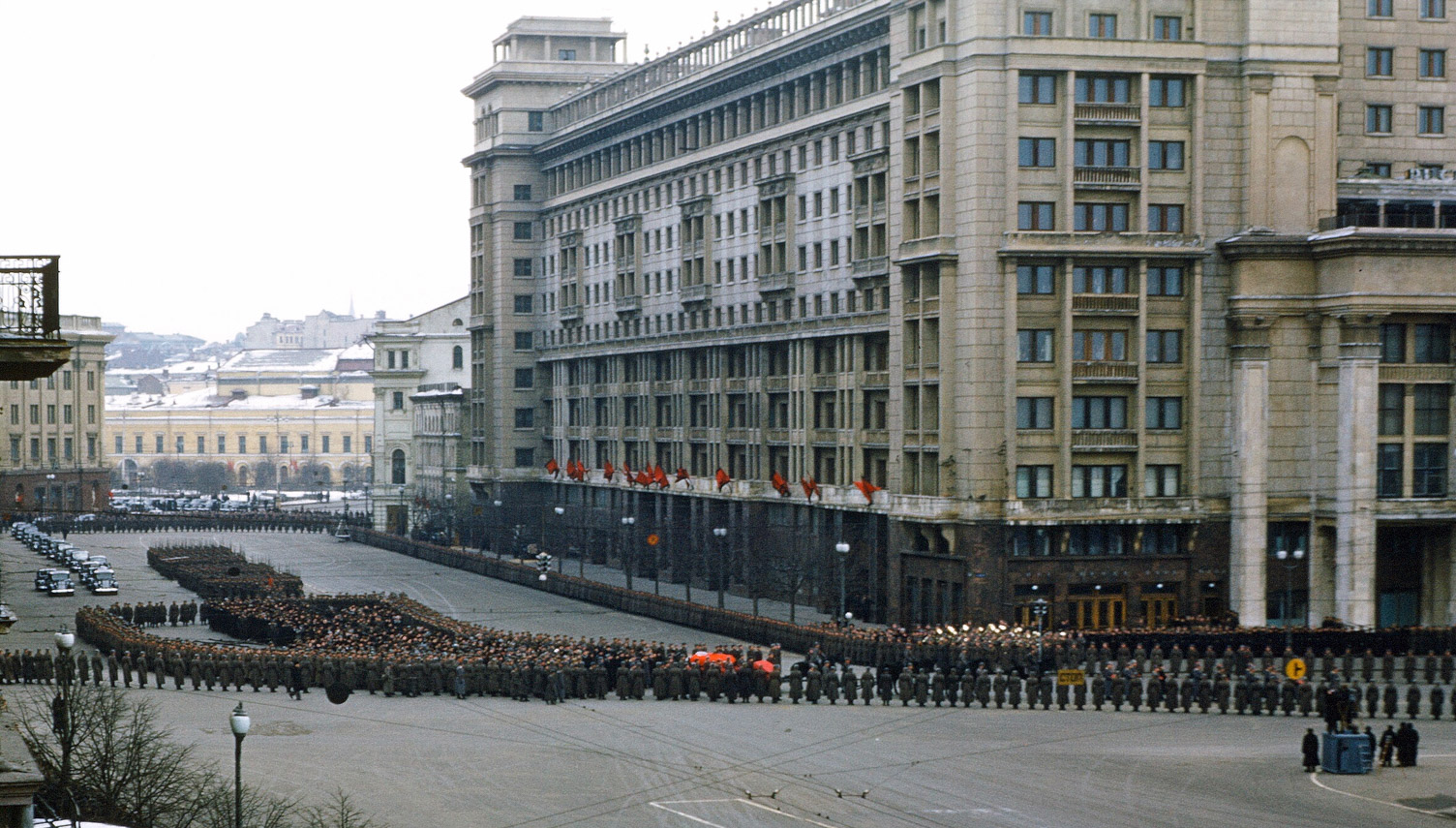
Stalin's funeral procession, 1953

In 1959, Nikita Khrushchev launched an anti-religious campaign. Of the 50 churches that were operating in Moscow in 1959, 30 were closed and six demolished. On 8 May 1965, the 20th anniversary of the Soviet victory in World War II, Moscow was awarded the honorary title of Hero City.

The Moscow Ring Road (MKAD) was opened in 1961. It had four lanes running 109 kilometers (68 mi) along city borders. The MKAD marked the administrative boundaries of the city until the 1980s, when outlying suburbs beyond the ring road were incorporated. In 1980, Moscow hosted the Summer Olympic Games, which were boycotted by the United States and other Western countries because the Soviet Union invaded Afghanistan in 1979. In 1991, Moscow was the scene of a coup attempt by conservative communists opposed to the liberal reforms of Mikhail Gorbachev.

=== 1991–present ===
When the USSR was dissolved in 1991, Moscow remained the capital of the Russian Federation. Since then, a market economy has emerged, producing a significant increase in Western-style retailing, services, architecture, and lifestyles. The city continued to grow during the 1990s and 2000s, its population rising from less than nine million to more than ten million. Scholars Mason and Nigmatullina argue that Soviet-era urban-growth controls produced controlled and sustainable metropolitan development, typified by the greenbelt built in 1935. Since then, however, low-density suburban sprawl has increased significantly, as a result of heavy demand for single-family dwellings (rather than multi-family apartments). In 1995–1997, the MKAD ring road was widened from an initial four lanes to ten lanes.

In December 2002, Bulvar Dmitriya Donskogo became the first Moscow Metro station to open outside the MKAD. The Third Ring Road—intermediate between the early 19th-century Garden Ring and the Soviet-era outer ring road—was completed in 2004. The greenbelt is becoming more fragmented, and satellite cities are appearing at the fringe. Summer dachas are being converted into year-round residences; with the proliferation of automobiles, the city has heavy traffic congestion. Multiple old churches and other examples of architectural heritage that were demolished during the Stalin era have been restored, such as the Cathedral of Christ the Saviour. In the 2010s, Moscow's administration launched long-term projects such as the Moja Ulitsa (lit. 'My Street') urban redevelopment program and the residence renovation program.

Through territorial expansion on 1 July 2012—southwest into the Moscow Oblast—the city's area more than doubled, increasing from 1,091 to 2,511 square kilometers (421 to 970 sq mi). As a result, Moscow became the largest city on the European continent by area; Moscow also grew in population by 233,000 people. The annexed territory was officially named Новая Москва (lit. 'New Moscow').

== Geography ==
=== Location ===
Satellite view of Moscow and its nearby suburbs

Moscow is situated on the banks of the Moskva River, which flows for about 500 kilometers (310 mi) through the East European Plain in Central Russia, not far from the natural border of the forest and the forest-steppe zone. A total of 49 bridges span the river and its canals within city limits. Moscow's elevation at the All-Russia Exhibition Center (VVC)—where the leading Moscow weather station is located—is 156 meters (512 ft). Teplostan Upland is the city's highest point at 255 meters (837 ft). The width of the city (excluding the MKAD) from west to east is 39.7 kilometers (24.7 mi), and the length from north to south is 51.8 kilometers (32.2 mi).

=== Time ===
Moscow serves as the reference point for the time zone used in most of European Russia, Belarus, and Crimea. These areas operate in Moscow Standard Time (MSK, МСК), which is 3 hours ahead of UTC (or UTC+3). Daylight saving time is no longer observed in Moscow. According to geographical longitude, the average solar noon in Moscow occurs at 12:30.

=== Climate ===
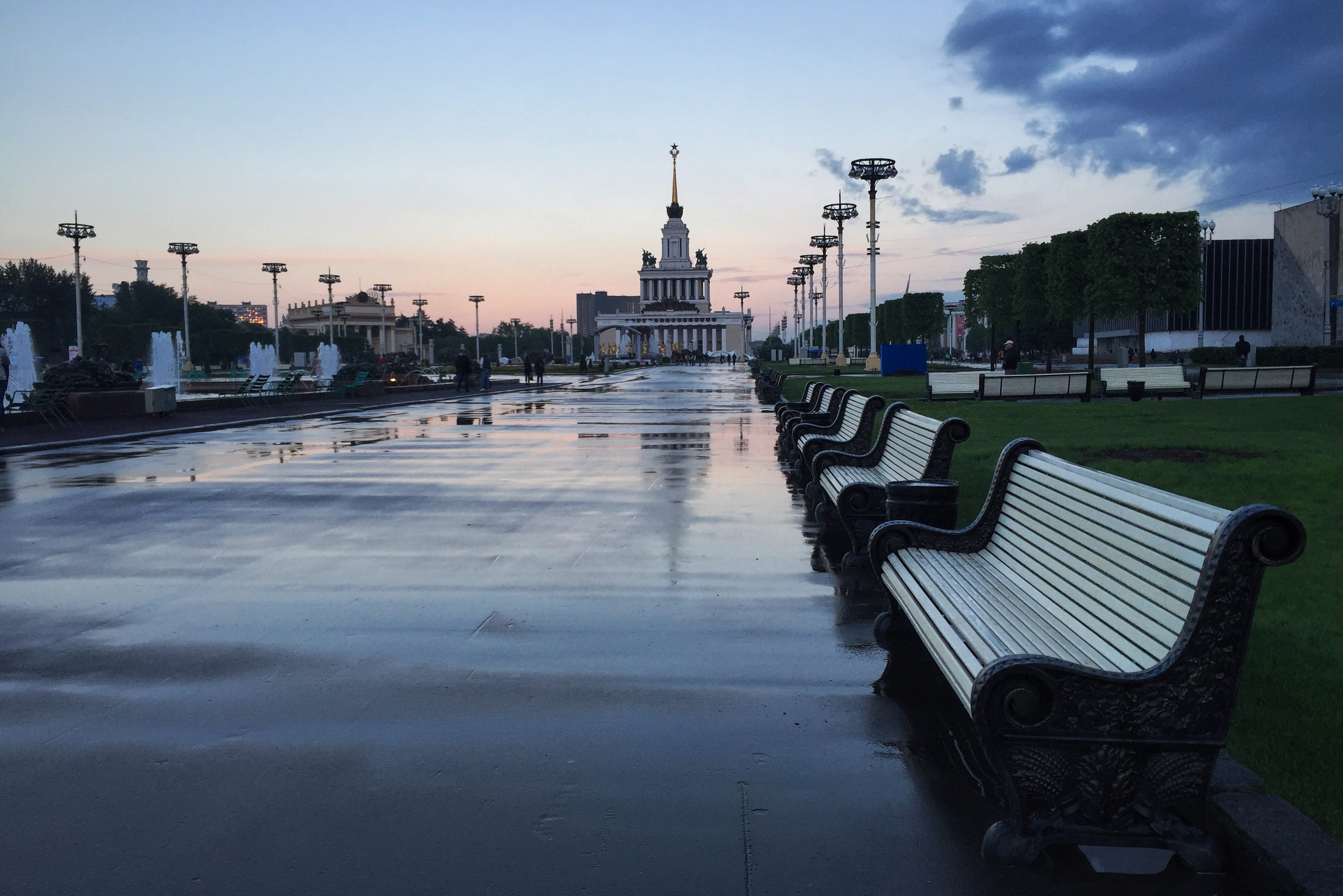
VDNKh (Exhibition of Achievements of National Economy) after rain

Moscow has a humid continental climate (Köppen climate classification: Dfb) with long, cold winters usually lasting from mid-November to the end of March, along with warm summers. More extreme continental climates at the same latitude—such as parts of Eastern Canada or Siberia—have much colder winters than Moscow does, suggesting that Moscow receives significant moderation from the Atlantic Ocean, even though the city is distant from it. Weather in Moscow can fluctuate widely: in the winter, temperatures range from −25 °C (−13 °F) in the city and −30 °C (−22 °F) in the suburbs to above 5 °C (41 °F); in the summer, temperatures range from 10 to 35 °C (50 to 95 °F).

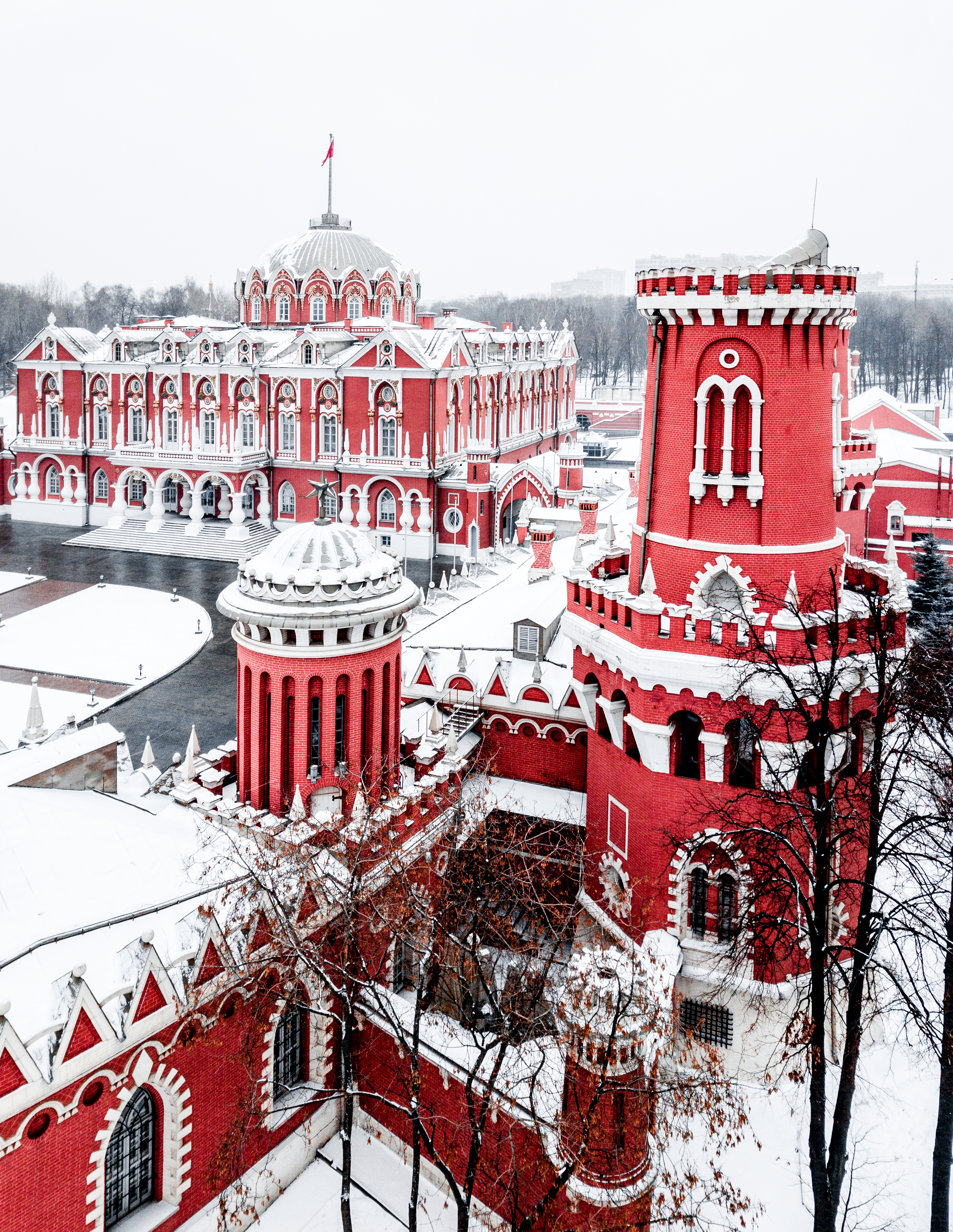
Petrovsky Palace on Leningradsky Avenue in winter

During the warm months of June, July, and August, typical high temperatures are 20 to 26 °C (68 to 79 °F). However, during heat waves (which can occur between May and September), daytime high temperatures often exceed 30 °C (86 °F), sometimes for a week or two. In the winter, average temperatures normally fall to approximately −10 °C (14 °F). Nevertheless, most winters have warmer periods with daytime temperatures rising above 0 °C (32 °F), as well as cooler periods with night temperatures falling below −20 °C (−4 °F). These periods usually last a week or two. The growing season in Moscow normally lasts for 156 days, usually around 1 May to 5 October.

The highest temperature ever recorded in Moscow was 38.2 °C (100.8 °F) at the VVC weather station, as well as 39.0 °C (102.2 °F) in the center of Moscow and at Domodedovo airport; this temperature occurred on 29 July 2010, during the unusual 2010 Northern Hemisphere heat waves. Record high and average temperatures were recorded in January, March, April, May, June, July, August, November, and December of 2007–2022. The average July temperature from 1991 to 2020 is 19.7 °C (67.5 °F). The lowest temperature ever recorded was −42.1 °C (−43.8 °F) in January 1940. Snow, which is present for about five months a year, often begins to fall in mid-October; snow cover persists in late November and melts at the end of March.

On average, Moscow receives 1731 hours of sunshine per year, ranging between 8% in December and 52% from May to August. This annual variation is due to convective cloud formation. In the winter, moist air from the Atlantic condenses in the cold continental interior, resulting in overcast conditions. However, this same continental influence results in sunnier summers than oceanic cities of similar latitude such as Edinburgh. Between 2004 and 2010, the average sunshine received varied between 1800 and 2000 hours, with a tendency toward more sunshine in summer months—up to a record 411 hours in July 2014, which represented 79% of potential sunshine. December 2017 was the darkest month in Moscow since records began, with only six minutes of sunlight.

Temperatures in the center of Moscow are often higher than in the outskirts and nearby suburbs, especially during winter. For example, if the average January temperature in the northeast of Moscow is −6.2 °C (20.8 °F), in the suburbs it is about −8.3 °C (17.1 °F). The temperature difference between the center of Moscow and nearby areas of Moscow Oblast can sometimes be more than 10 °C (18 °F) on frosty winter nights.

Climate data for Moscow (VDNKh) WMO ID: 27612; coordinates 55°49′53″N 37°37′20″E; elevation: 147 m (482 ft); 1991–2020 normals, extremes 1879–present
Month	Jan	Feb	Mar	Apr	May	Jun	Jul	Aug	Sep	Oct	Nov	Dec	Year
Record high °C (°F)	8.6 (47.5)	8.3 (46.9)	19.7 (67.5)	28.9 (84.0)	33.2 (91.8)	34.8 (94.6)	38.2 (100.8)	37.3 (99.1)	32.3 (90.1)	24.0 (75.2)	16.2 (61.2)	9.6 (49.3)	38.2 (100.8)
Mean maximum °C (°F)	2.8 (37.0)	3.5 (38.3)	10.8 (51.4)	21.7 (71.1)	27.3 (81.1)	29.5 (85.1)	31.0 (87.8)	30.0 (86.0)	24.7 (76.5)	17.9 (64.2)	8.9 (48.0)	4.2 (39.6)	31.9 (89.4)
Mean daily maximum °C (°F)	−3.9 (25.0)	−3 (27)	3.0 (37.4)	11.7 (53.1)	19.0 (66.2)	22.4 (72.3)	24.7 (76.5)	22.7 (72.9)	16.4 (61.5)	8.9 (48.0)	1.6 (34.9)	−2.3 (27.9)	10.1 (50.2)
Daily mean °C (°F)	−6.2 (20.8)	−5.9 (21.4)	−0.7 (30.7)	6.9 (44.4)	13.6 (56.5)	17.3 (63.1)	19.7 (67.5)	17.6 (63.7)	11.9 (53.4)	5.8 (42.4)	−0.5 (31.1)	−4.4 (24.1)	6.3 (43.3)
Mean daily minimum °C (°F)	−8.7 (16.3)	−8.8 (16.2)	−4.2 (24.4)	2.3 (36.1)	8.1 (46.6)	12.2 (54.0)	14.8 (58.6)	13.0 (55.4)	8.0 (46.4)	3.0 (37.4)	−2.4 (27.7)	−6.5 (20.3)	2.6 (36.7)
Mean minimum °C (°F)	−21.1 (−6.0)	−20.9 (−5.6)	−12.8 (9.0)	−5.1 (22.8)	0.3 (32.5)	5.8 (42.4)	9.7 (49.5)	6.8 (44.2)	0.9 (33.6)	−4.6 (23.7)	−11.7 (10.9)	−17.3 (0.9)	−23.9 (−11.0)
Record low °C (°F)	−42.1 (−43.8)	−38.2 (−36.8)	−32.4 (−26.3)	−21 (−6)	−7.5 (18.5)	−2.3 (27.9)	1.3 (34.3)	−1.2 (29.8)	−8.5 (16.7)	−20.3 (−4.5)	−32.8 (−27.0)	−38.8 (−37.8)	−42.1 (−43.8)
Average precipitation mm (inches)	53 (2.1)	44 (1.7)	39 (1.5)	37 (1.5)	61 (2.4)	78 (3.1)	84 (3.3)	78 (3.1)	66 (2.6)	70 (2.8)	52 (2.0)	51 (2.0)	713 (28.1)
Average extreme snow depth cm (inches)	24 (9.4)	35 (14)	29 (11)	2 (0.8)	0 (0)	0 (0)	0 (0)	0 (0)	0 (0)	0 (0)	4 (1.6)	12 (4.7)	35 (14)
Average rainy days	8	6	9	15	16	16	15	16	16	17	13	8	155
Average snowy days	25	23	15	6	1	0	0	0	0.3	5	17	24	116
Average relative humidity (%)	85	81	74	68	67	72	74	78	82	83	86	86	78
Mean monthly sunshine hours	33	72	128	170	265	279	271	238	147	78	32	18	1,731
Mean daily sunshine hours	1.1	2.5	4.1	5.7	8.5	9.3	8.7	7.7	4.9	2.5	1.1	0.6	4.7
Mean daily daylight hours	7.9	9.7	11.9	14.3	16.3	17.4	16.8	14.9	12.7	10.5	8.4	7.2	12.3
Percentage possible sunshine	14	27	35	40	53	53	52	51	38	24	13	8	34
Average ultraviolet index	0	1	2	3	5	6	6	5	3	1	1	0	3
Source 1: Pogoda.ru.net, Thermograph.ru, Meteoweb.ru (sunshine hours)
Source 2: Weather Atlas (UV)

Climate data for Moscow (VDNKh) normals 1961–1990
Month	Jan	Feb	Mar	Apr	May	Jun	Jul	Aug	Sep	Oct	Nov	Dec	Year
Mean daily maximum °C (°F)	−6.3 (20.7)	−4.2 (24.4)	1.5 (34.7)	10.4 (50.7)	18.4 (65.1)	21.7 (71.1)	23.1 (73.6)	21.5 (70.7)	15.4 (59.7)	8.2 (46.8)	1.1 (34.0)	−3.5 (25.7)	8.9 (48.0)
Daily mean °C (°F)	−9.3 (15.3)	−7.7 (18.1)	−2.2 (28.0)	5.8 (42.4)	13.1 (55.6)	16.6 (61.9)	18.2 (64.8)	16.4 (61.5)	11.1 (52.0)	5.1 (41.2)	−1.2 (29.8)	−6.1 (21.0)	5.0 (41.0)
Mean daily minimum °C (°F)	−12.3 (9.9)	−11.1 (12.0)	−5.6 (21.9)	1.7 (35.1)	7.6 (45.7)	11.5 (52.7)	13.5 (56.3)	12.0 (53.6)	7.1 (44.8)	2.0 (35.6)	−3.3 (26.1)	−8.6 (16.5)	1.2 (34.2)

Recent changes in Moscow's regional climate are often cited by climate scientists as evidence of global warming, since the city is in the middle latitudes of the Northern Hemisphere; however, by definition, climate change is global, not regional. During the summer, very high temperatures are often recorded in the city (in 2001, 2002, 2003, 2010, 2011, and 2021). Along with the southern part of Central Russia, after recent years of hot summer seasons, Moscow's climate shows hot-summer classification trends. Winter has also become significantly milder: for example, the average January temperature in the early 1900s was −12.0 °C (10.4 °F), while it is currently about −7.0 °C (19.4 °F). The end of January–February is often colder, with frosts reaching −30.0 °C (−22.0 °F) a few nights per year (in 2006, 2010, 2011, 2012, and 2013).

As of 2024, the most recent decade was the warmest in the history of meteorological observations of Moscow. Temperature changes in the city are shown in the table below:

Climate data for Moscow (2014–2024, VVC)
Month	Jan	Feb	Mar	Apr	May	Jun	Jul	Aug	Sep	Oct	Nov	Dec	Year
Mean daily maximum °C (°F)	−4.2 (24.4)	−1.6 (29.1)	4.3 (39.7)	11.7 (53.1)	19.3 (66.7)	22.9 (73.2)	24.4 (75.9)	23.7 (74.7)	17.0 (62.6)	8.7 (47.7)	1.8 (35.2)	−2 (28)	10.5 (50.9)
Daily mean °C (°F)	−6.2 (20.8)	−3.7 (25.3)	0.8 (33.4)	7.3 (45.1)	14.1 (57.4)	17.7 (63.9)	19.6 (67.3)	18.8 (65.8)	13.0 (55.4)	6.3 (43.3)	0.3 (32.5)	−3.4 (25.9)	7.1 (44.8)
Mean daily minimum °C (°F)	−7.9 (17.8)	−5.8 (21.6)	−2.7 (27.1)	2.9 (37.2)	8.9 (48.0)	12.5 (54.5)	14.9 (58.8)	13.9 (57.0)	9.1 (48.4)	3.8 (38.8)	−1.2 (29.8)	−4.7 (23.5)	3.6 (38.5)
Mean monthly sunshine hours	37	65	142	213	274	299	323	242	171	88	33	14	1,901
Source: weatheronline.co.uk

Wind direction in Moscow from 2002 to 2012 (average values)
North	Northeast	East	South East	Southern	Southwest	West	Northwest
15%	6.8%	7.8%	12.2%	12.6%	14.6%	16.4%	14.5%
Source: world-weather.ru

== Paleontology ==
Moscow has internationally significant paleontological monuments in its area. One of these is the Gorodnya River with its tributaries, on the banks of which are located outcrops of the Quaternary and older Cretaceous periods. Fossils of the bivalve mollusk Inoceramus kleinii and tubular passages of burrowing animals—described in 2017 as a new ichnospecies, Skolithos gorodnensis—were discovered in Coniacian deposits near the stream bed of the Bolshaya Glinka River. The trace fossils Ichnogenera Diplocraterion, Planolites, Skolithos, and possibly Ophiomorpha were found in Albian deposits. Paleolithic flint tools were discovered in the Quaternary deposits of the Bolshaya Glinka stream bed.

In 1878, paleontologist Hermann Trautschold discovered the left flipper of an ichthyosaur (an extinct large marine reptile) near the village of Mnevniki, which later became part of Moscow. In 2014, this ichthyosaur was named Undorosaurus trautscholdi, after its discoverer. Trautschold determined the age of the sediments from which the specimen was taken to be Kimmeridgian; however, according to more recent studies, these sediments were formed during the Tithonian age of the Jurassic period.

Other organisms—Albian foraminifera and ammonites—are also known from Moscow deposits.

Fossils of various organisms are displayed in Moscow museums, including the Orlov Museum of Paleontology and the Vernadsky State Geological Museum.

== Demographics ==
=== Population ===
Historical population
Year	Pop.	±%
1897	1,038,625	—
1926	1,995,252	+92.1%
1939	4,141,633	+107.6%
1959	5,045,905	+21.8%
1970	6,941,961	+37.6%
1979	7,830,509	+12.8%
1989	8,769,117	+12.0%
2002	10,382,754	+18.4%
2010	11,503,501	+10.8%
2021	13,010,112	+13.1%
Population size may be affected by changes in administrative divisions. Source: Census data

According to the 2021 Russian census, Moscow's population was 13,010,112, an increase from 11,503,501 in the 2010 Russian census.

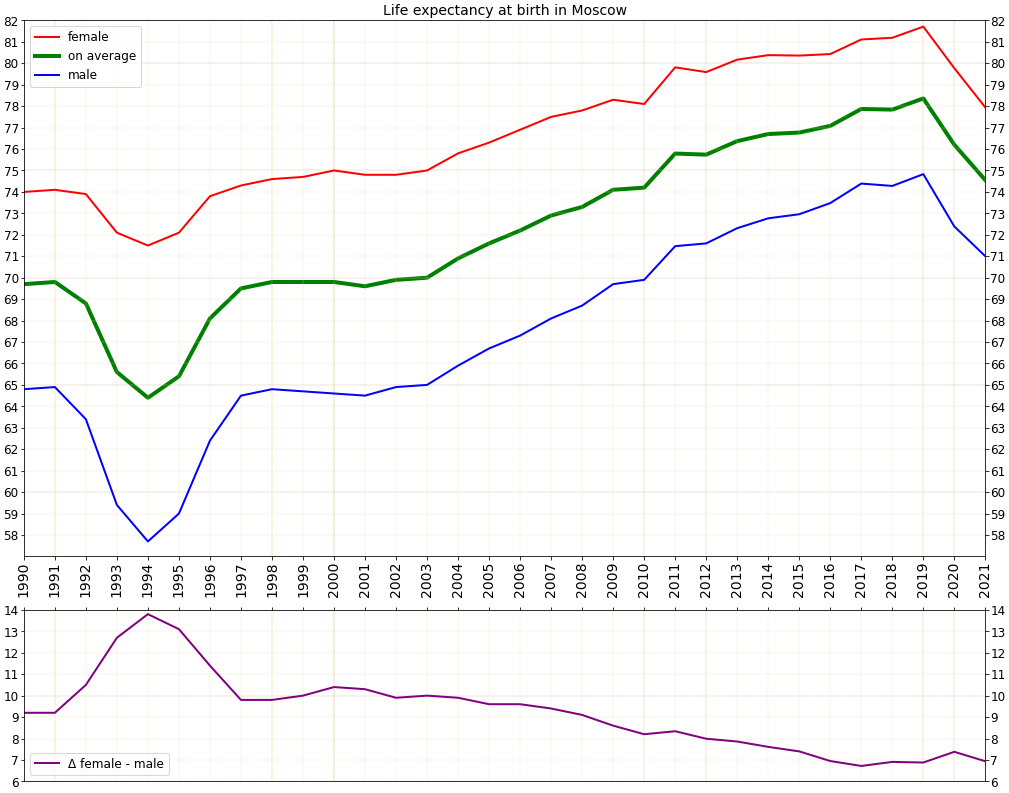
Life expectancy at birth since 1990, with gender differences. Life expectancy has been declining since 2019.

=== Ethnic groups ===
Ethnicity by year
Ethnicity	Year										
Ethnicity	1897 (Note: Taken from the language of respondents)	1939	1959	1970	1979	1989	2002	2010		2021	
Ethnicity	Number (% of pop.)	Number (%)	Number (%)	Number (%)	Number (%)	Number (%)	Number (%)	Number (%)	% of ethnicity declared	Number (%)	% of ethnicity declared
Russians	987,044 (95.0%)	3,614,430 (87.4%)	4,507,899 (88.6%)	6,301,247 (89.2%)	7,146,682 (90.1%)	7,963,246 (89.7%)	8,808,009 (84.8%)	9,930,410 (86.3%)	91.6%	9,074,375 (69.7%)	90.2%
Tatars	4,288 (0.1%)	57,687 (1.4%)	80,489 (1.6%)	109,252 (1.5%)	131,328 (1.7%)	157,376 (1.8%)	166,083 (1.6%)	149,043 (1.3%)	1.4%	84,373 (0.6%)	0.8%
Armenians	1,604 (0.1%)	13,682 (0.3%)	18,379 (0.4%)	25,584 (0.4%)	31,414 (0.4%)	43,989 (0.5%)	124,425 (1.2%)	106,466 (0.9%)	1.0%	68,018 (0.5%)	0.7%
Ukrainians	4,478 (0.4%)	90,479 (2.2%)	115,489 (2.3%)	184,885 (2.6%)	206,875 (2.6%)	252,670 (2.8%)	253,644 (2.4%)	154,104 (1.3%)	1.4%	58,788 (0.5%)	0.6%
Azerbaijanis	– (–)	677 (–)	2,528 (–)	4,889 (–)	7,967 (0.1%)	20,727 (0.2%)	95,563 (0.9%)	57,123 (0.5%)	0.5%	37,259 (0.3%)	0.4%
Uzbeks	– (–)	659 (–)	2,478 (–)	5,973 (–)	4,222 (–)	9,183 (0.1%)	9,183 (0.1%)	35,595 (0.3%)	0.3%	29,526 (0.2%)	0.3%
Jews	5,070 (0.4%)	250,181 (6.0%)	239,246 (4.7%)	251,350 (3.6%)	222,900 (2.8%)	174,728 (2.0%)	79,359 (0.8%)	53,145 (0.5%)	0.5%	28,014 (0.2%)	0.3%
Georgians	– (–)	4,251 (0.1%)	6,365 (0.1%)	9,563 (0.1%)	12,180 (0.2%)	19,608 (0.2%)	54,387 (0.5%)	38,934 (0.3%)	0.4%	26,222 (0.2%)	0.3%
Tajiks	– (–)	184 (–)	1,005 (–)	1,652 (–)	1,221 (–)	2,893 (–)	35,385 (0.4%)	27,280 (0.2%)	0.2%	22,783 (0.2%)	0.2%
Belarusians	1,016 (–)	24,952 (0.6%)	34,370 (0.7%)	50,257 (0.7%)	59,193 (0.7%)	73,005 (0.8%)	59,353 (0.6%)	39,225 (0.3%)	0.4%	17,632 (0.1%)	0.2%
Kyrgyz	– (–)	77 (–)	– (–)	– (–)	1,173 (–)	3,044 (–)	4,102 (–)	18,736 (0.2%)	0.2%	16,858 (0.1%)	0.2%
Others	– (–)		76,173 (–)					225,031 (2.0%)	2.1%	595,543 (4.6%)	5.9%
No ethnicity declared	– (–)							668,409 (5.8%)	–	2,950,721 (22.7%)	–
Total	1,038,591 (100%)	4,137,018 (100%)	5,085,581 (100%)	7,061,008	7,931,602 (100%)	8,875,579 (100%)	10,382,754 (100%)	11,503,501 (100%)	100% (10,835,092)	13,010,112 (100%)	100% (10,059,391)

- 668,409 people were registered from administrative databases and could not declare an ethnicity. The proportion of ethnicities in this group is estimated to be the same as the proportion in the declared group.

=== Vital statistics ===
The official population of Moscow is based on people holding "permanent residency". According to Russia's Federal Migration Service, Moscow has 1.8 million official "guests" who have temporary residency on the basis of visas or other documentation; this results in a legal population of 14.8 million. The number of illegal immigrants—the vast majority originating from Central Asia—is estimated to be an additional 1 million people; this results in a total population of about 15.8 million.

Births and Deaths (2024):

- Births: 120,215 (9.1 per 1,000 people)
- Deaths: 116,478 (8.9 per 1,000 people)

Total fertility rate (2025): 1.43 children per woman

Life expectancy (2021): Total—74.55 years (male—71.00, female—77.94)

=== Religion ===
Religion in Moscow (2020)
Russian Orthodoxy	55%
Atheism and irreligion	28%
Islam	8%
Other religions	3%
Other Christians	2%
Undeclared	4%

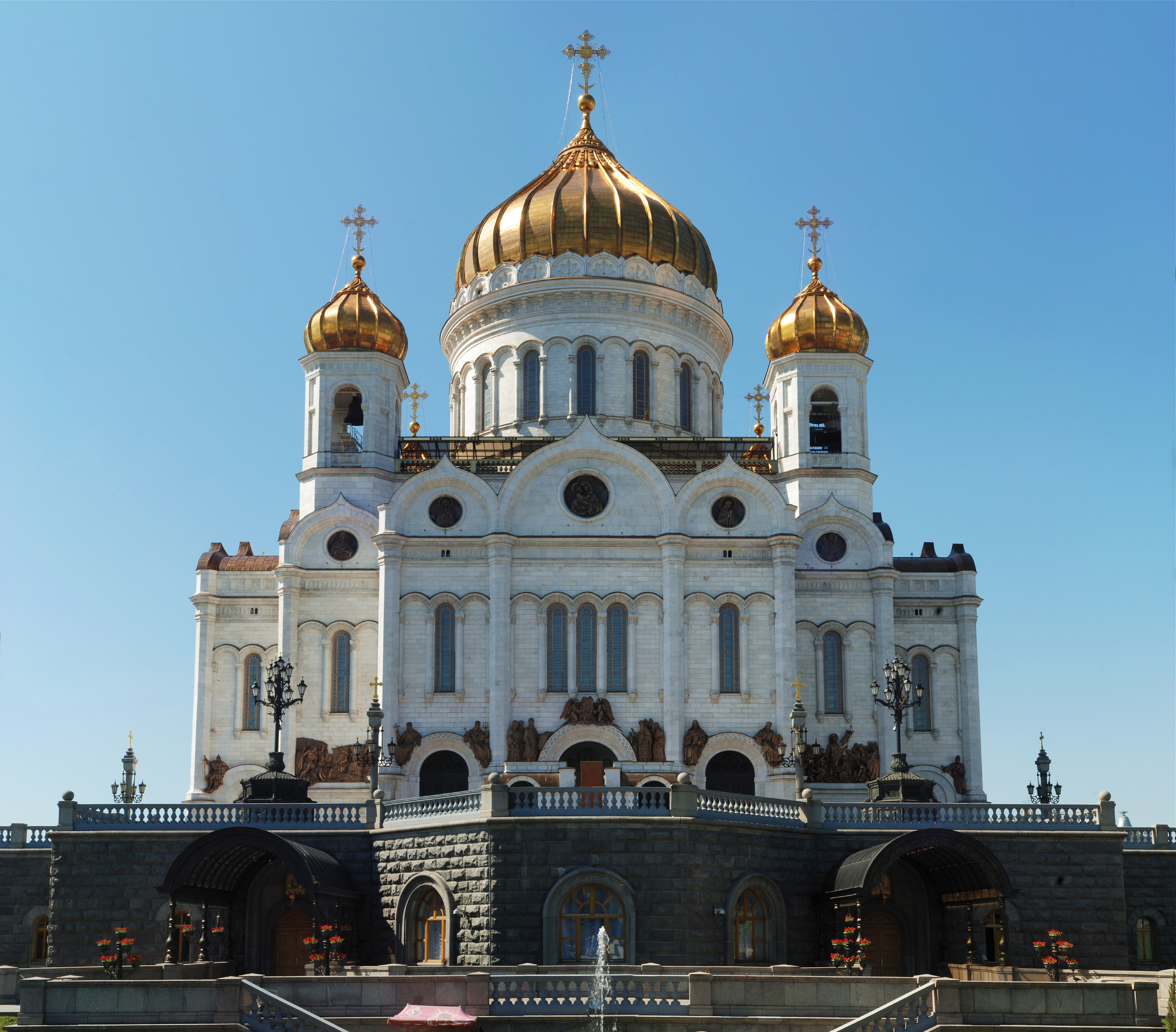
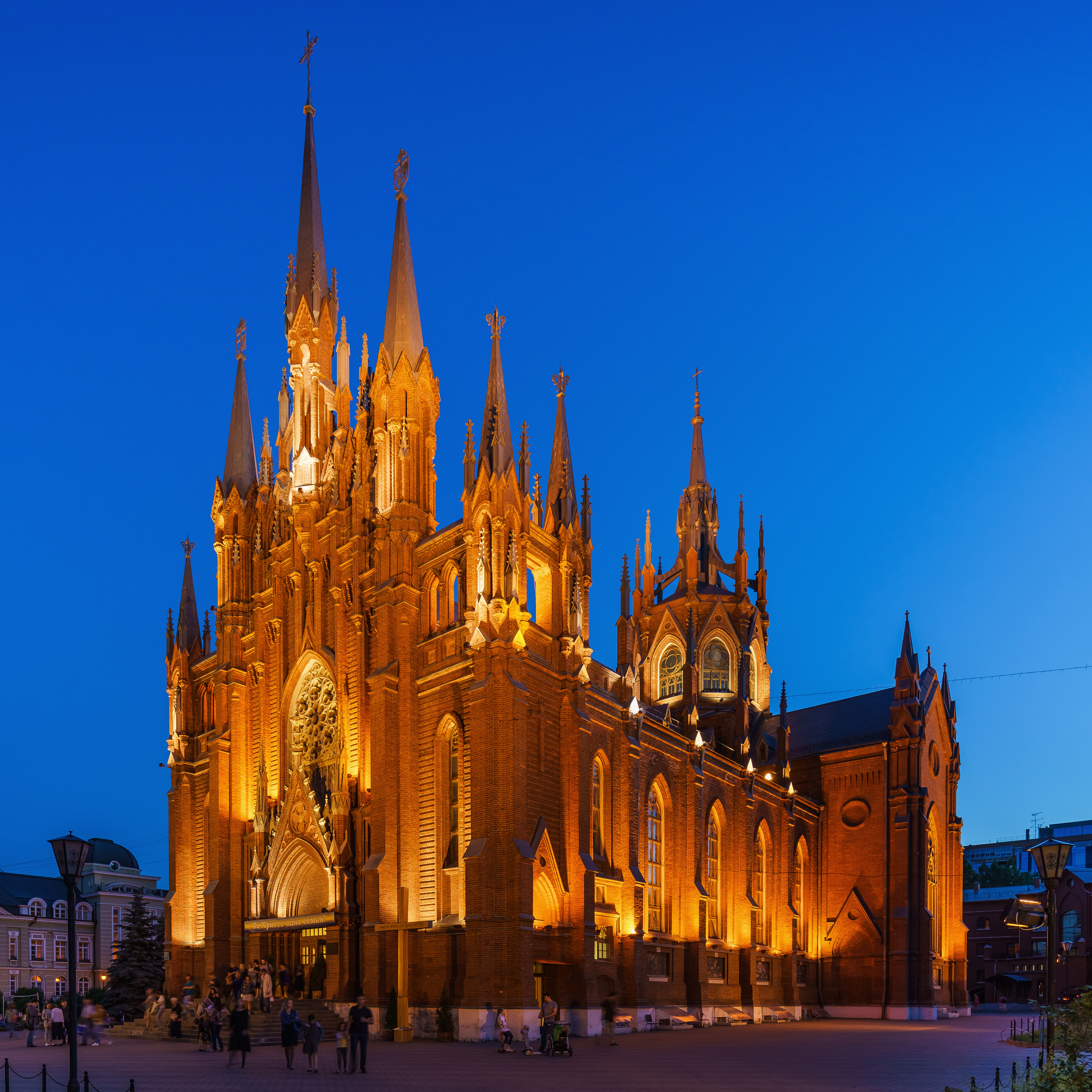
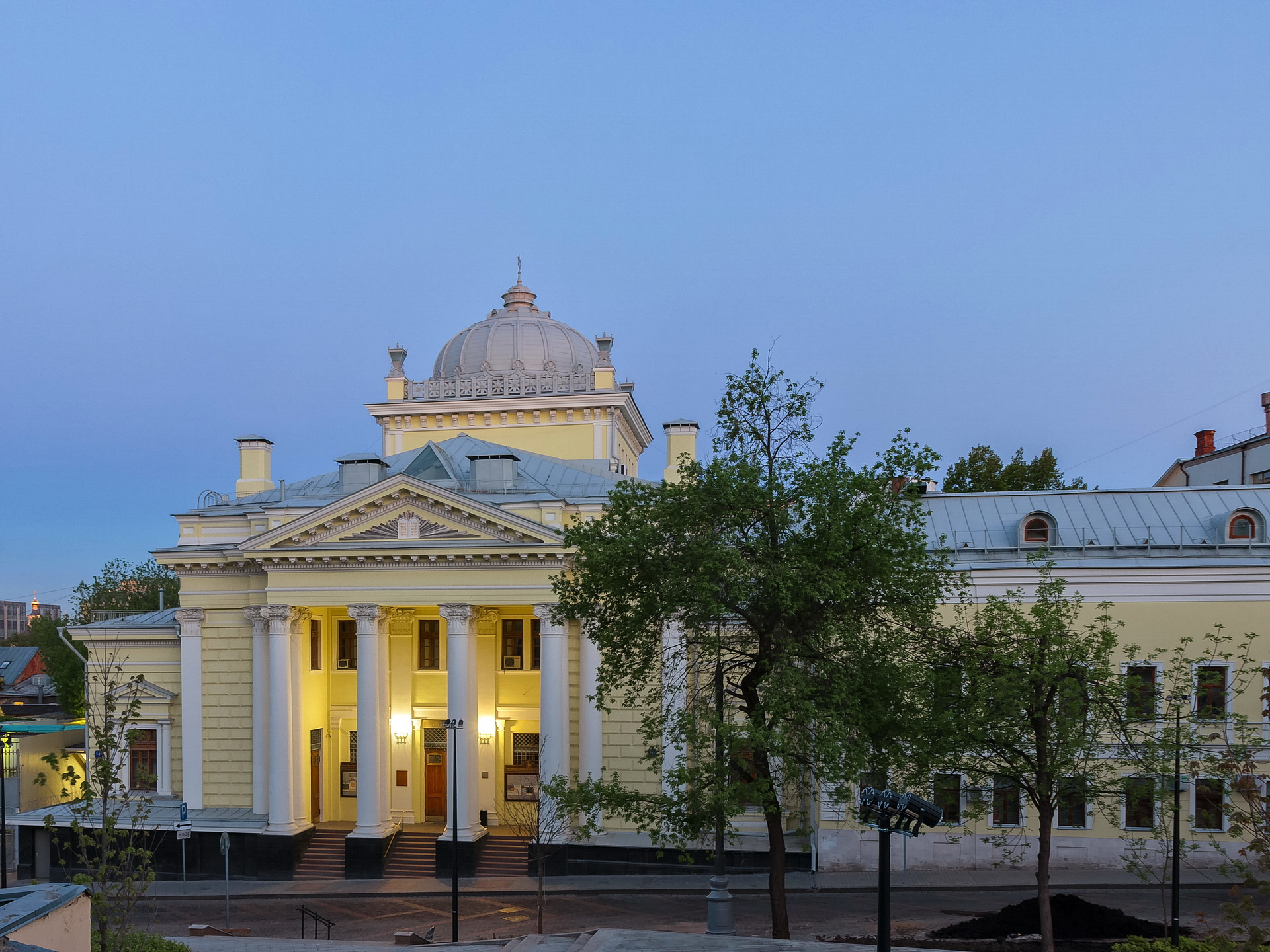
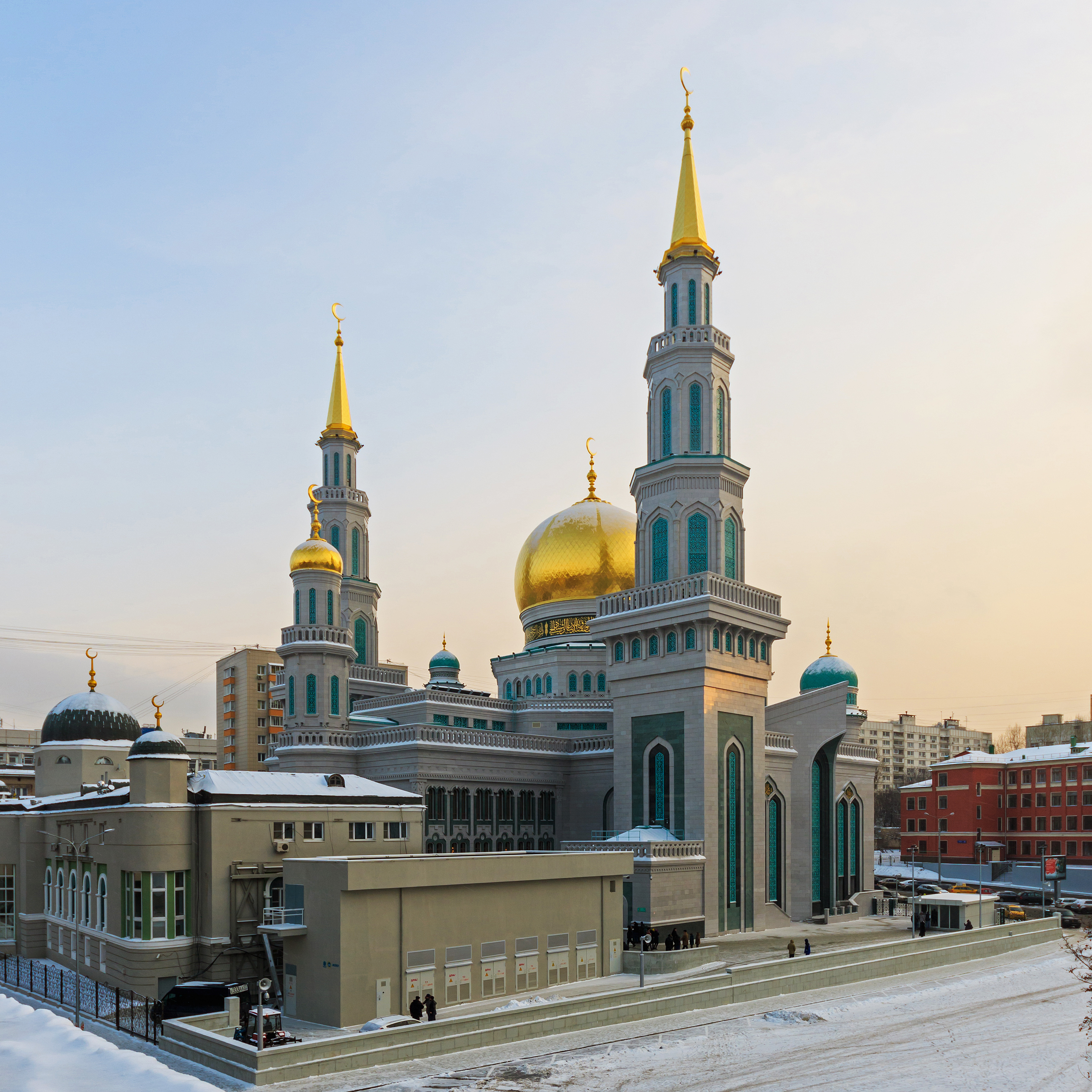
Clockwise from left: the Cathedral of Christ the Saviour, demolished during the Soviet period and reconstructed from 1990–2000; Cathedral of the Immaculate Conception; Moscow Cathedral Mosque; and Moscow Choral Synagogue

Christians constitute the majority of the city's population, most of whom follow the Russian Orthodox Church. The Patriarch of Moscow serves as the head of the Church and lives in the Danilov Monastery. Moscow was called the "city of 40 times 40 churches"—before the Russian Revolution in 1917. Moscow is Russia's capital of Eastern Orthodox Christianity, which has been the country's traditional religion.

Other religions practiced in Moscow include Buddhism, Hinduism, Islam, Judaism, Yazidism, and Rodnovery (Slavic Native Faith). The Moscow Mufti Council claimed that Muslims numbered around 1.5 million of the city's 10.5 million population in 2010. The city has four mosques.

== Cityscape ==
=== Architecture ===
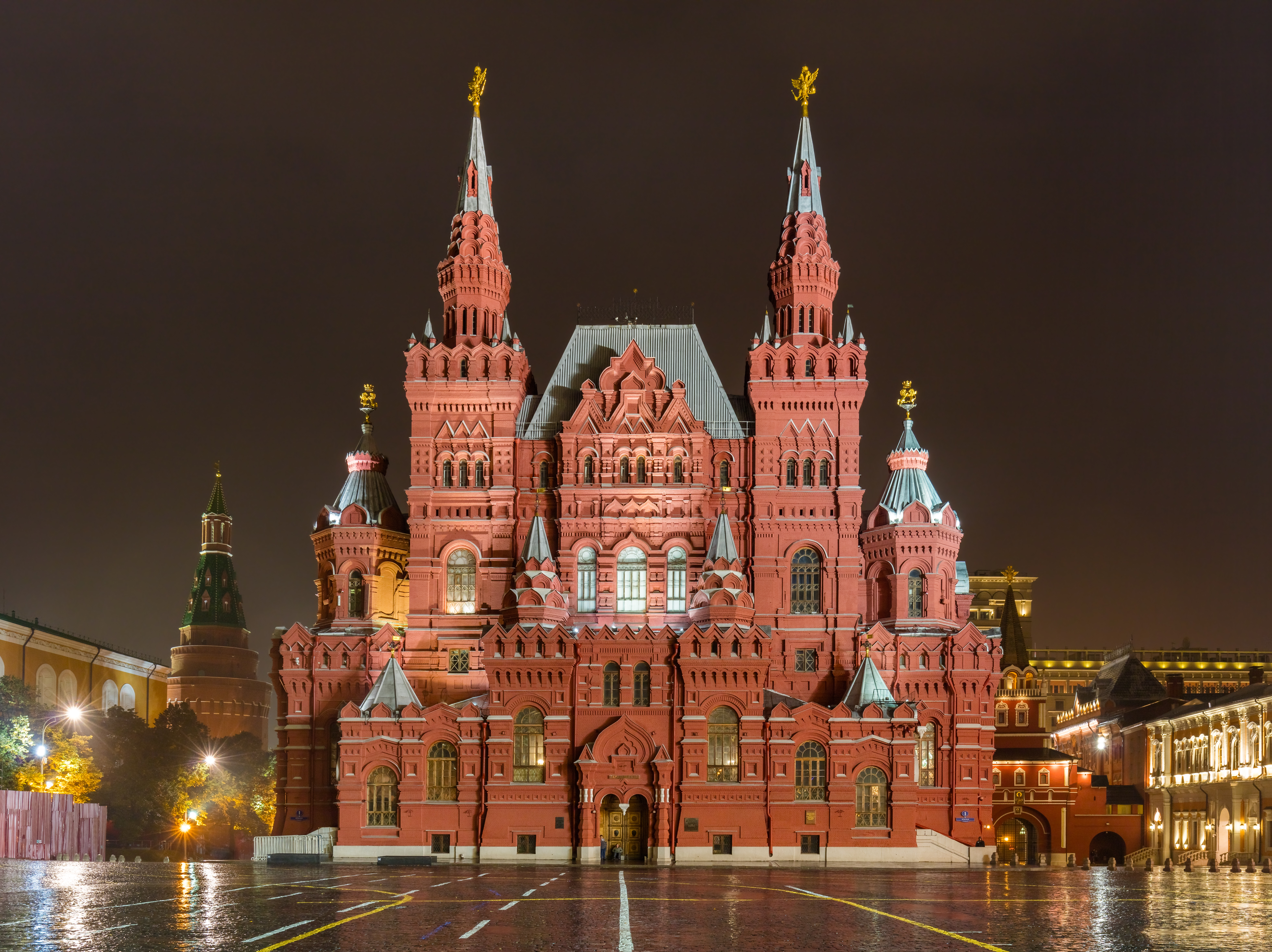
The State Historical Museum, an example of the Neo-Russian style

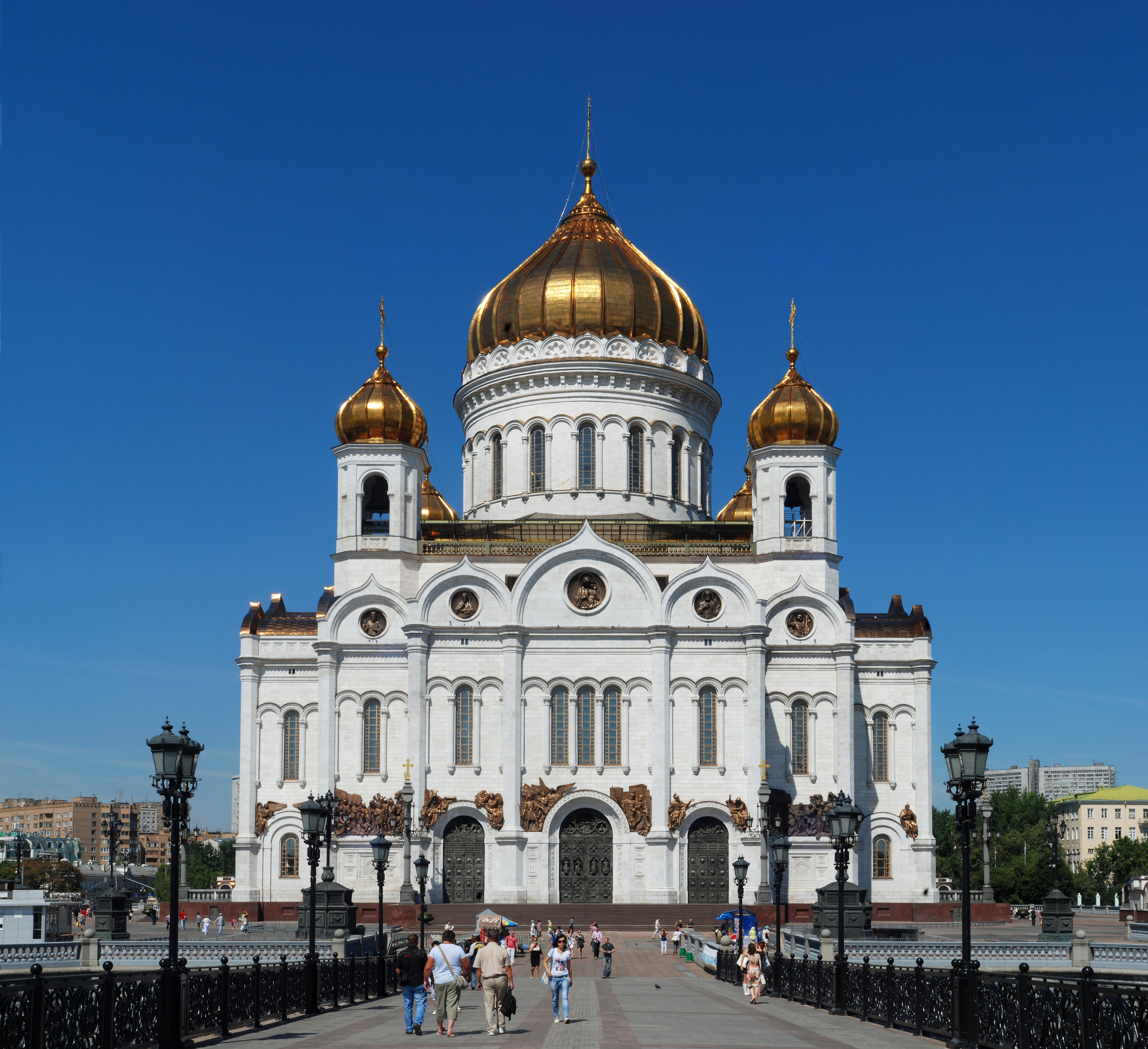
The Cathedral of Christ the Saviour, an example of Neo-Byzantine architecture

Moscow's architecture is internationally known. Moscow is the site of Saint Basil's Cathedral—with its onion domes—as well as the Cathedral of Christ the Saviour and the Seven Sisters (Stalin-era skyscrapers). The first Kremlin was built in the middle of the 12th century.

Medieval Moscow's design featured concentric walls and intersecting radial thoroughfares. That layout, as well as the city's rivers, helped to shape the city's design in later centuries.

The Kremlin was rebuilt during the 15th century. Its towers and some of its churches were built by Italian architects, lending the city some atmosphere of the Renaissance period. From the end of the 15th century, Moscow was embellished by masonry structures such as monasteries, palaces, walls, towers, and churches.

The city's appearance had not changed much by the 18th century. Houses were constructed of pine and spruce logs; they had shingled roofs plastered with sod or covered by birch bark. The rebuilding of Moscow during the second half of the 18th century was motivated by continual fires and the needs of the nobility. Much of the old wooden city was replaced by buildings in the classical style.

For much of its history, Moscow's architecture was dominated by Orthodox churches. However, the city's overall appearance changed during Soviet times, especially as a result of Joseph Stalin's large-scale effort to "modernize" Moscow. Stalin's plans for the city included a network of broad avenues and roadways, some of them more than ten lanes wide, which—while significantly simplifying movement through the city—were constructed at the expense of many historical buildings and districts. Among the many losses from Stalin's demolitions were the Sukharev Tower, an old city landmark, as well as mansions and commercial buildings. The city's new status as the capital of a strongly secular nation made religiously significant buildings particularly vulnerable to demolition. Many of the city's churches—in most cases some of Moscow's oldest and most prominent buildings—were destroyed. Notable examples of this destruction include Kazan Cathedral and the Cathedral of Christ the Saviour. During the 1990s, both cathedrals were rebuilt. Many smaller churches, however, were lost.

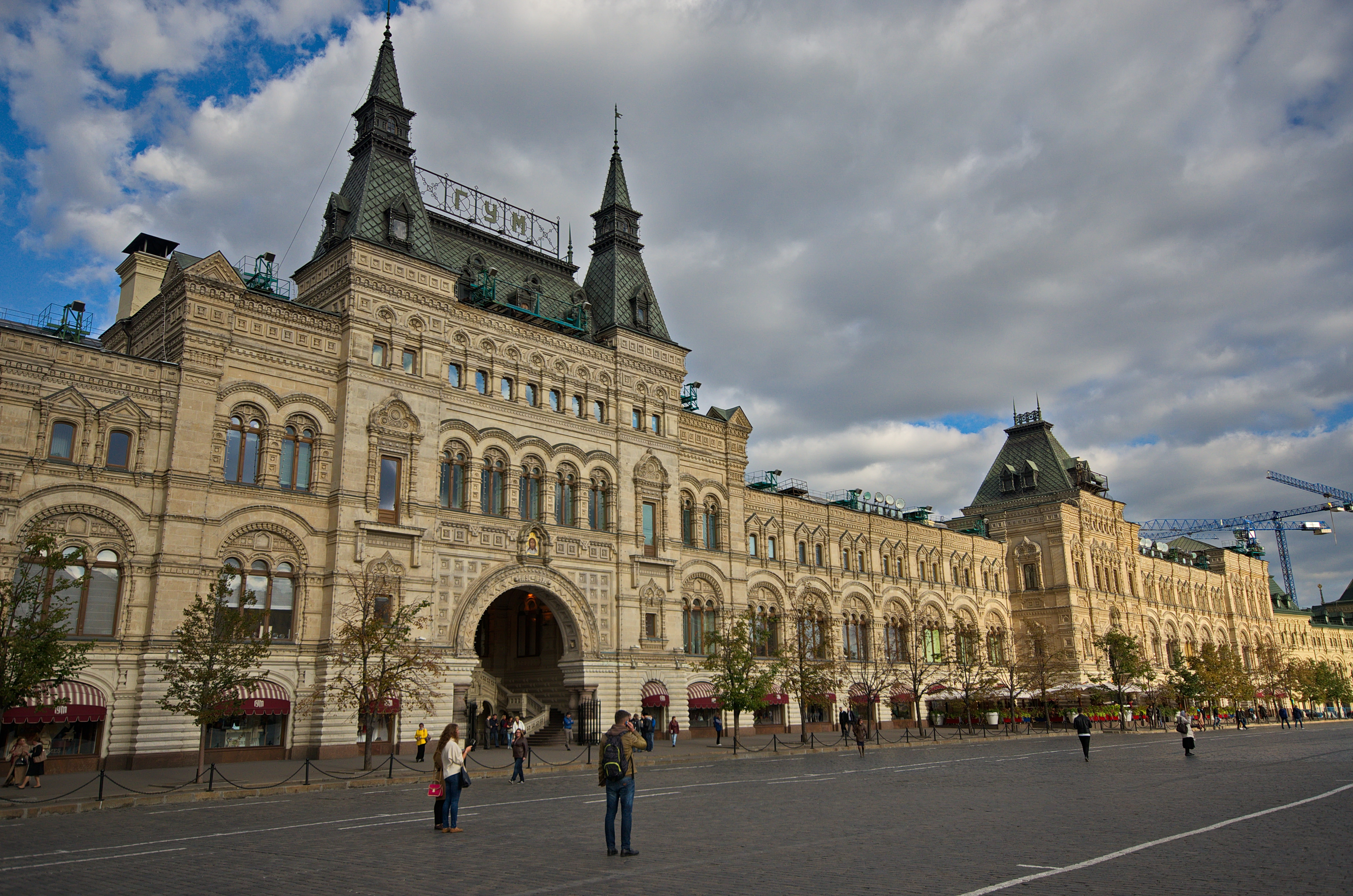
GUM department store, facing Red Square

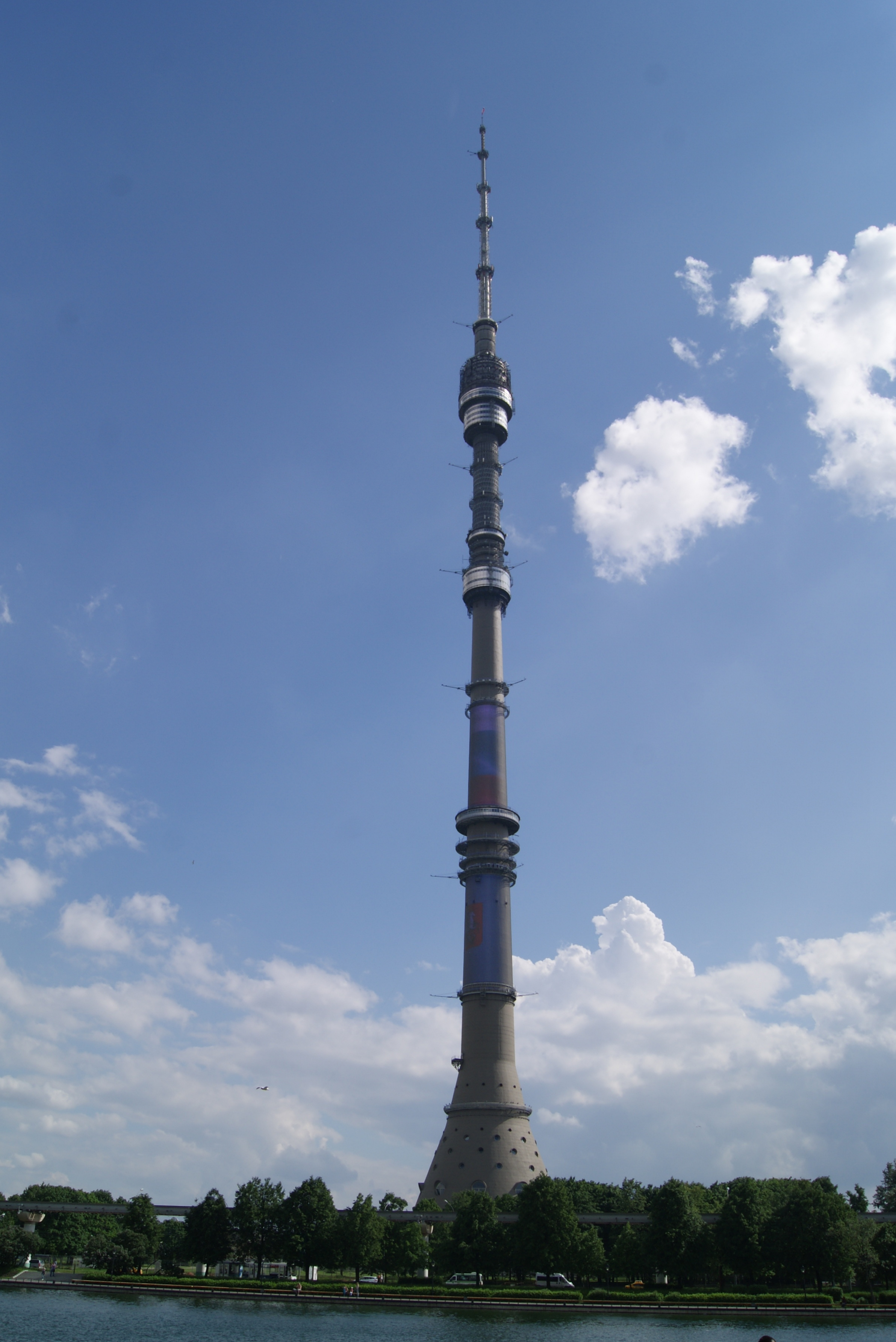
Ostankino Tower, the tallest freestanding structure in Europe and the eighth-tallest in the world

While the later Stalinist period was characterized by the restriction of creativity and architectural innovation, the earlier post-revolutionary years saw many radical buildings created in the city. Particularly notable were the constructivist architects associated with VKHUTEMAS (the Russian state's art and technical school), responsible for such landmarks as Lenin's Mausoleum. Another prominent architect was Vladimir Shukhov, famous for Shukhov Tower, one of many hyperboloid towers that he designed. This one was built between 1919 and 1922 as a transmission tower for a Russian broadcasting company. Shukhov left an enduring legacy in the constructivist architecture of early Soviet Russia. He designed shop galleries, notably the GUM department store on Red Square, which was bridged with innovative metal-and-glass vaults.

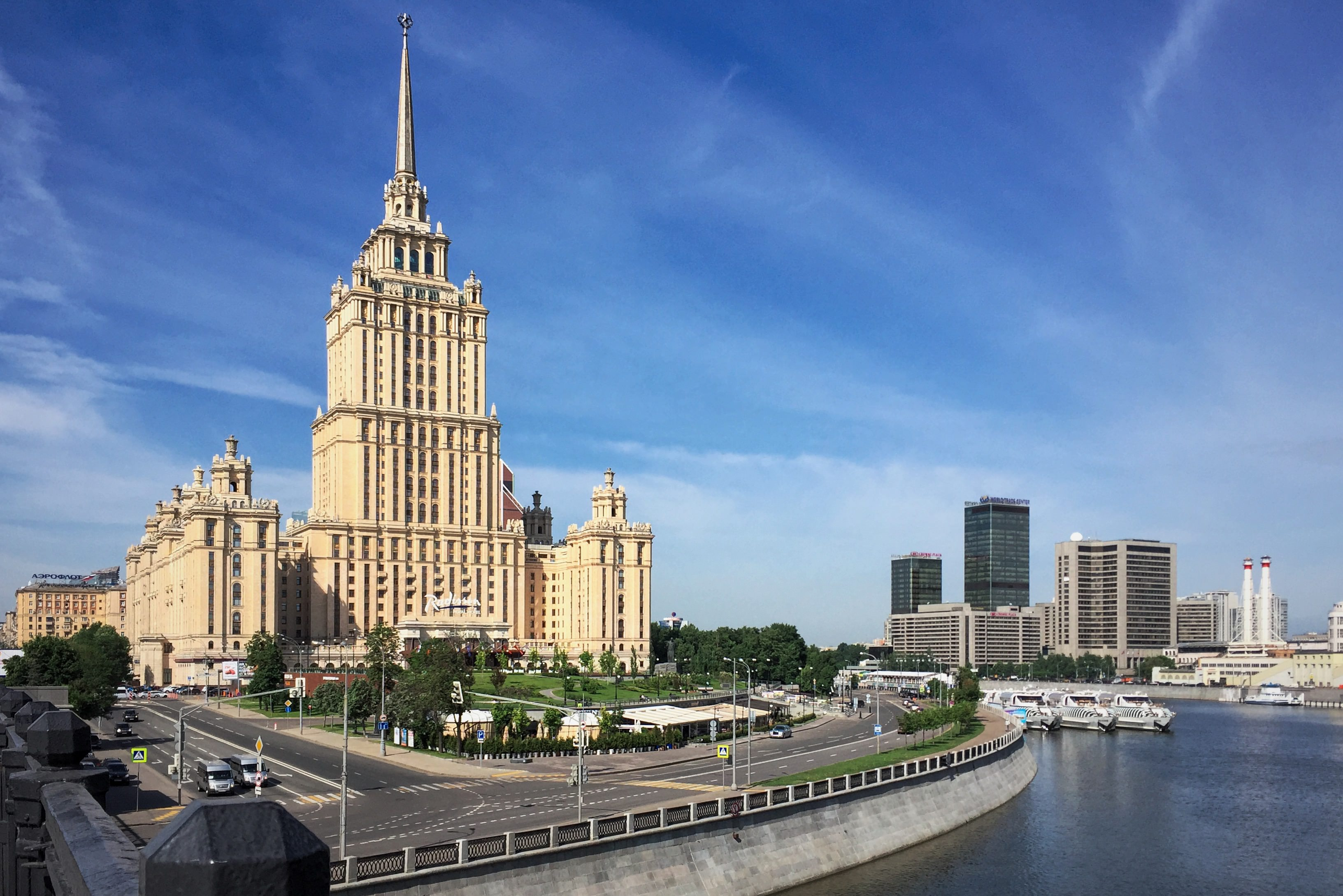
One of the Seven Sisters, Hotel Ukraina, is the tallest hotel in Europe and one of the tallest hotels in the world.

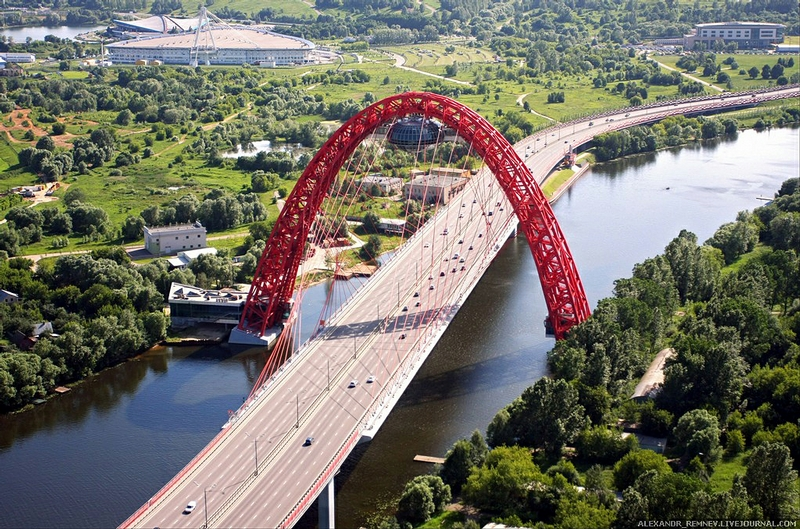
Zhivopisny Bridge, the highest cable-stayed bridge in Europe

The most recognizable contributions of the Stalinist period may be the so-called Seven Sisters, seven large skyscrapers distributed around the city at approximately equal distances from the Kremlin. A defining feature of Moscow's skyline, their imposing form was allegedly inspired by the Manhattan Municipal Building in New York City; their style—with intricate exteriors and a large central spire—has been described as Stalinist Gothic architecture. All seven towers can be seen from most elevated locations in the city. These towers are among the tallest constructions in central Moscow apart from the Ostankino Tower; when this tower was completed in 1967, it was the highest freestanding land structure in the world. It remains the world's seventy-second tallest, ranked among buildings such as the Burj Khalifa in Dubai, Taipei 101 in Taiwan, and the CN Tower in Toronto.

The Soviet goal of providing housing for every family, along with the rapid growth of Moscow's population, led to the construction of large, monotonous housing blocks. Most of these were built after Stalin's era, and their styles are often named after the contemporary leader (e.g., Brezhnev and Khrushchev). These blocks are usually badly maintained.

Although the city retains some five-story apartment buildings constructed before the mid-1960s, more recent apartment buildings are usually at least nine stories tall and have elevators. Moscow is estimated to have more than twice as many elevators as New York City and four times as many as Chicago. Moslift, one of the city's major elevator operators, has about 1,500 mechanics on call to respond when residents become trapped.

Stalinist-era buildings, mostly found in the central part of the city, are large and usually ornamented with Socialist realism motifs that imitate classical themes. However, small churches—almost always Eastern Orthodox—around the city evoke its past. The Old Arbat Street, a tourist street that was once the center of a bohemian area, retains most of its buildings from before the 20th century. Many buildings found on the inner city's side streets (behind the Stalinist façades of Tverskaya Street, for example) provide examples of bourgeois architecture typical of Tsarist times. Ostankino Palace, Kuskovo, Uzkoye, and other large estates just outside Moscow originally belonged to nobles during the Tsarist era. Some convents and monasteries, both inside and outside the city, are open to Muscovites and tourists.

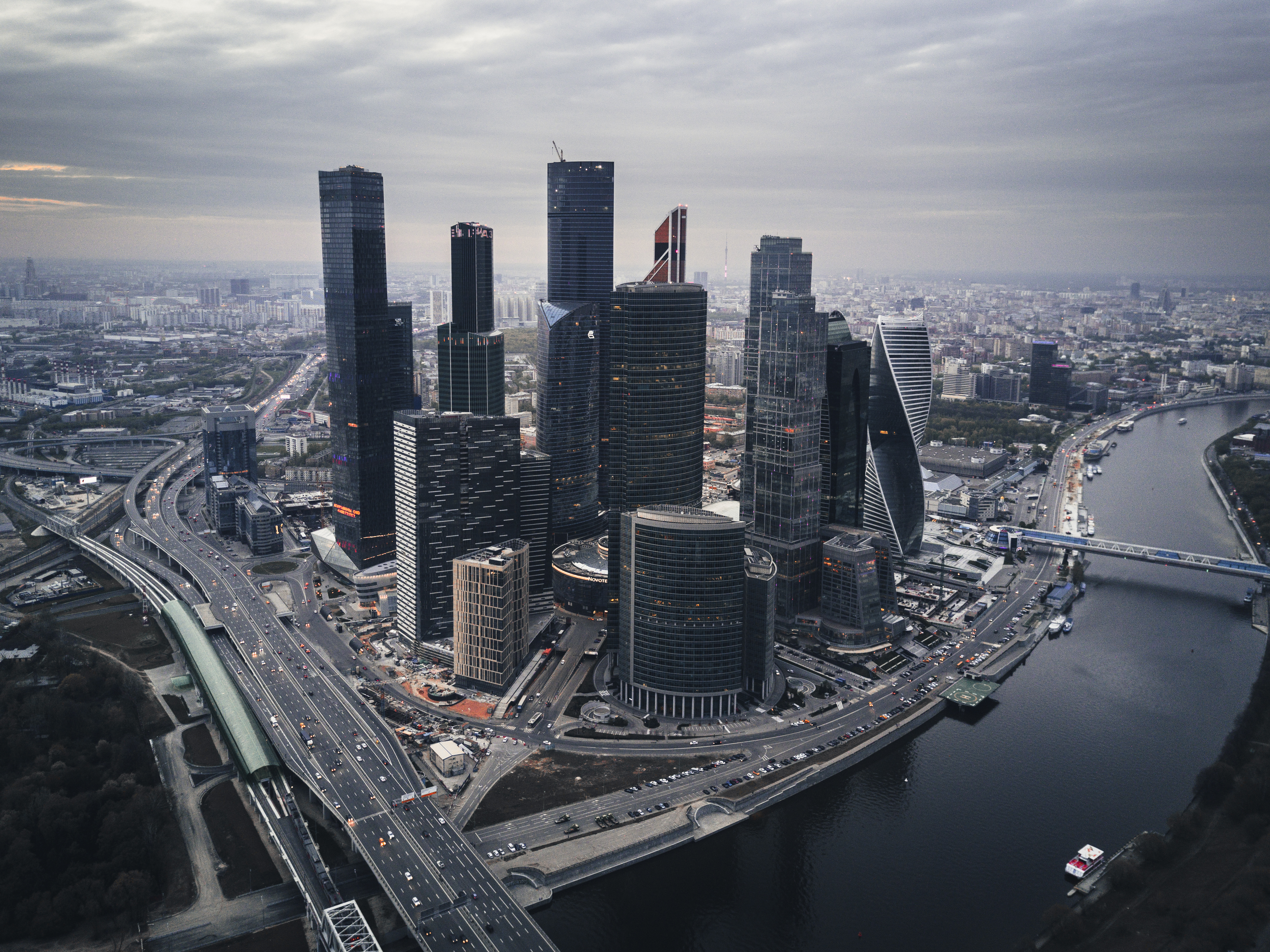
Modern methods of skyscraper construction were first utilized in the city for the Moscow International Business Center (MIBC).

Attempts are being made to restore many of the city's best-maintained examples of pre-Soviet architecture. These restored structures are distinguished by bright colors and particularly clean façades. There are also a few examples of Soviet avant-garde work, such as the house of the architect Konstantin Melnikov in the Arbat area. Many of these restorations were criticized for allegedly disrespecting historical authenticity. In addition, facadism is widely practiced. Later examples of Soviet architecture are usually distinguished by large size and semi-Modernist styles. An example is the Novy Arbat project—informally called the "false teeth of Moscow"—and known for widespread disruption of the project's historic area in central Moscow.

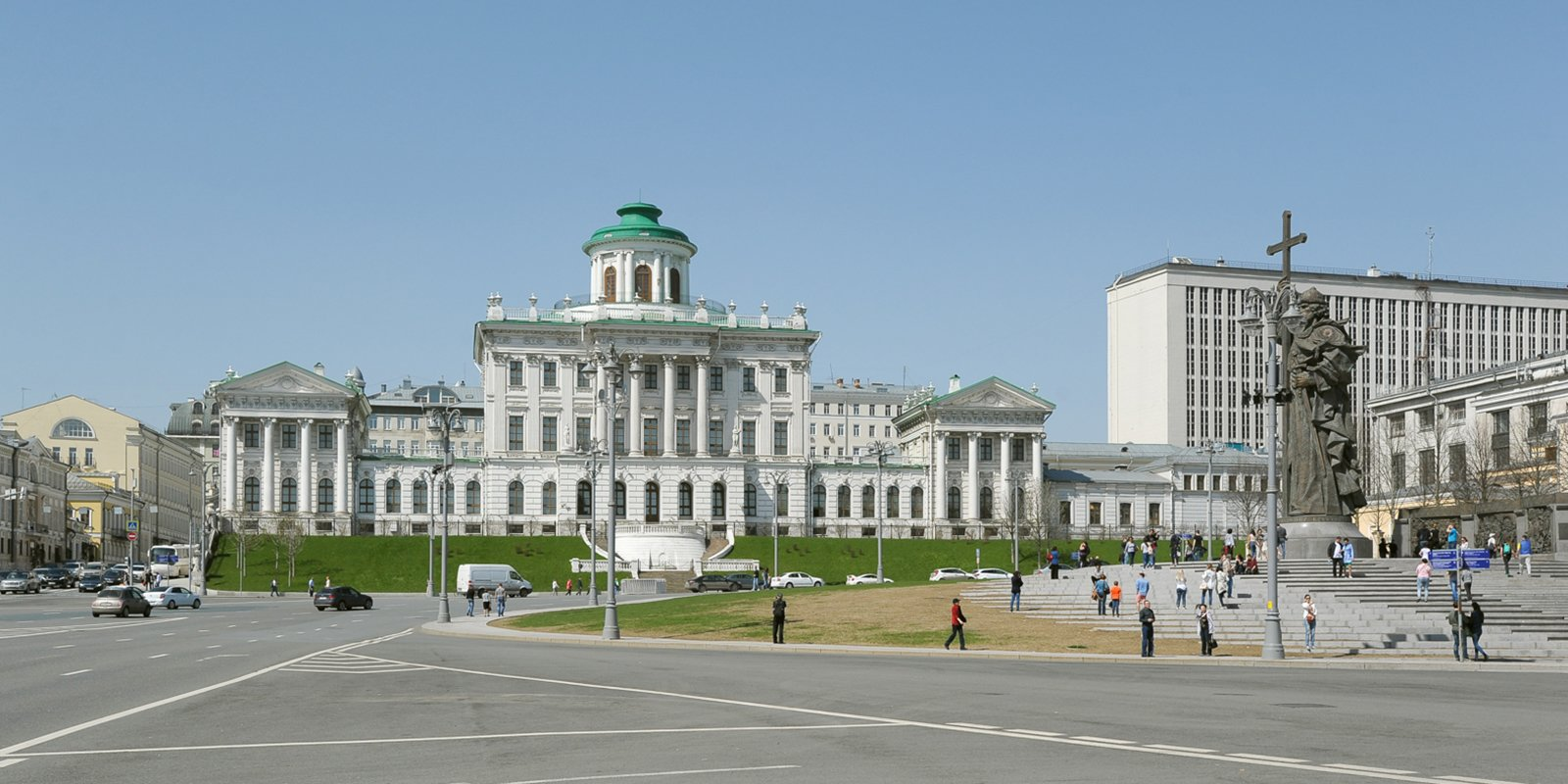
Borovitskaya Square—Monument to Vladimir the Great and Pashkov House

Plaques on house exteriors inform pedestrians where a well-known personality once lived. Often, these plaques are dedicated to Soviet celebrities little known outside Russia (and similarly, for decorated generals and revolutionaries, little known inside Russia). In addition, Moscow contains many "museum houses" dedicated to famous Russian writers, composers, and artists.

Moscow's skyline is rapidly modernizing, with several new towers being constructed. In recent years, the city administration has been widely criticized for the widespread destruction of many historical buildings. As much as a third of historic Moscow has been destroyed during the past few years to make space for luxury apartments and hotels. Other historical buildings—including landmarks such as the 1930 Moskva hotel and the 1913 department store Voyentorg—have been razed and rebuilt, with an inevitable loss in historical value. Critics blame the government for not enforcing conservation laws: during the last 12 years, more than 50 buildings with monument status were torn down, several of these dating back to the 17th century. In addition, some critics wonder if the funds used for reconstructing razed buildings could not be used to renovate decaying structures—such as many works of architect Konstantin Melnikov, as well as the Mayakovskaya metro station.

Some organizations, such as the Moscow Architecture Preservation Society and Save Europe's Heritage, are trying to attract international public attention to these problems.

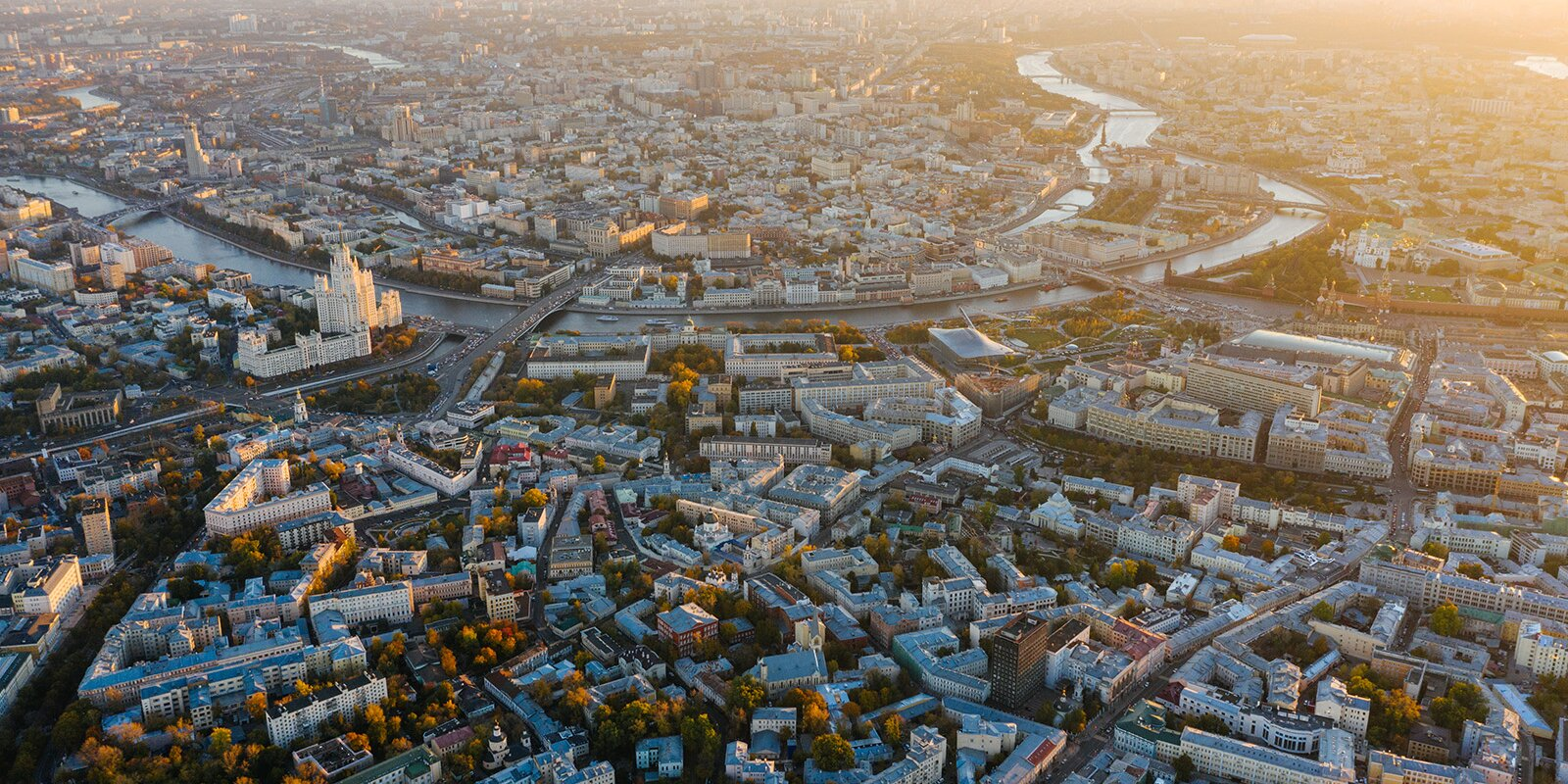
Panoramic view of Moscow

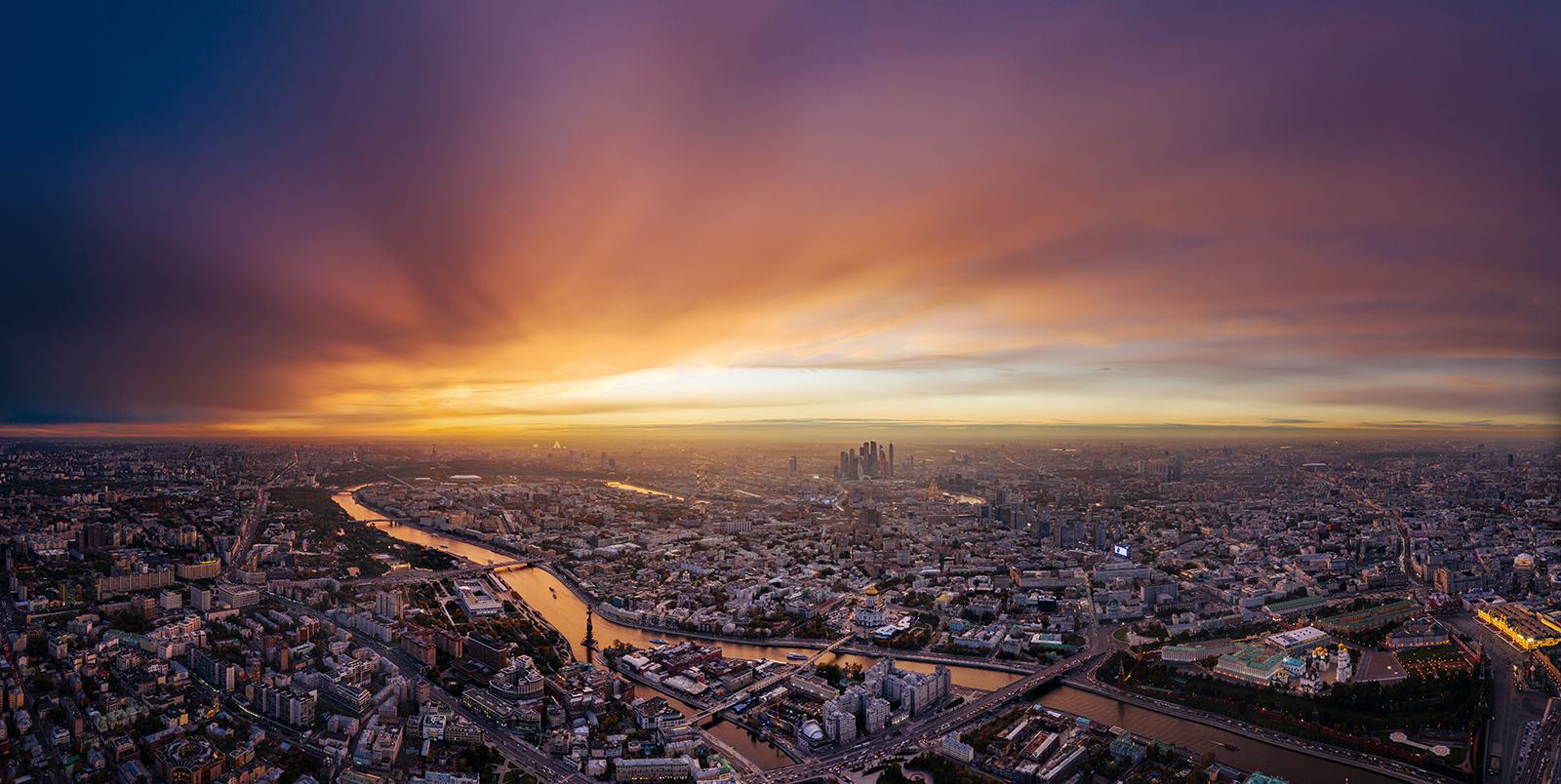
Panoramic view of Moscow

=== Parks and landmarks ===
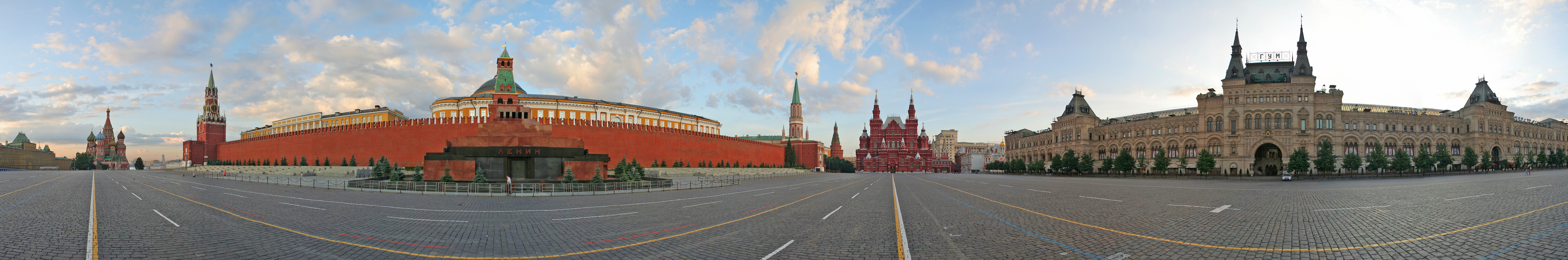
Red Square is a UNESCO World Heritage Site.

Moscow contains 96 parks and 18 gardens, including four botanical gardens. The city contains 450 square kilometers (170 sq mi) of green space in addition to 100 square kilometers (39 sq mi) of forests. Moscow is green in comparison with other cities of comparable size in Western Europe and North America; this stems partly from a history of green "yards" with trees and grass between residential buildings. Moscow contains on average 27 square meters (290 sq ft) of parks per person, compared with 6 square meters in Paris, 7.5 in London and 8.6 in New York.

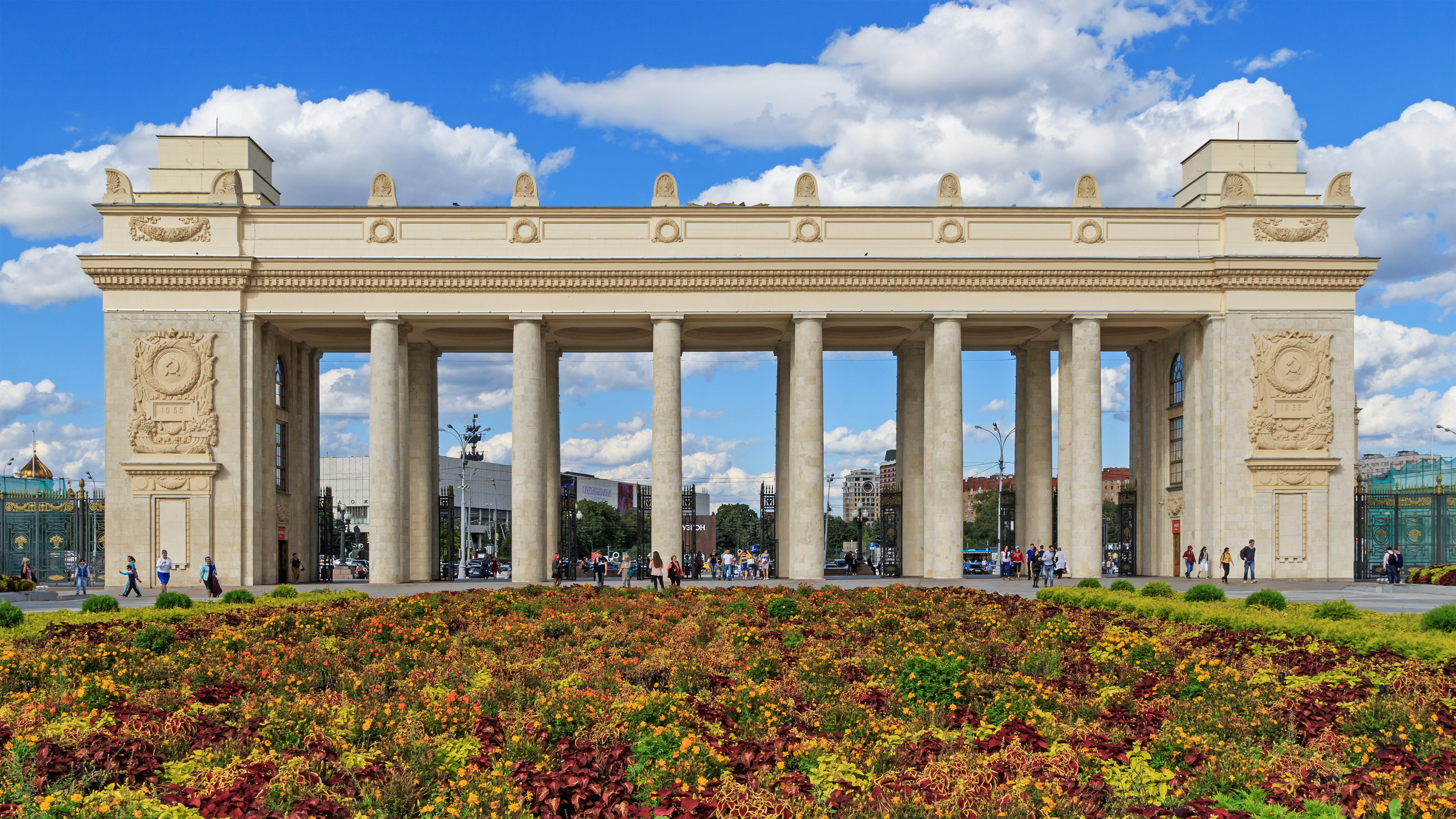
Gorky Park

Gorky Park (officially the Central Park of Culture and Rest), named after writer Maxim Gorky, was founded in 1928. The main area (689,000 square meters or 170 acres) along the Moskva River contains estrades (raised platforms), children's attractions—including the Observation Wheel, as well as ponds with boats and water bicycles—dancing, tennis courts, and other sports facilities. Gorky Park borders the Neskuchny Garden (408,000 square meters or 101 acres), the oldest park in Moscow and a former imperial residence, created as a result of integrating three estates during the 18th century. The garden features the Green Theater, one of the largest open amphitheaters in Europe, able to contain up to 15 thousand people. Several parks include a section known as a "Park of Culture and Rest", sometimes alongside a wilder area. (Such parks include Izmaylovsky, Fili, and Sokolniki.) Some parks are designated Forest Parks (lesopark).

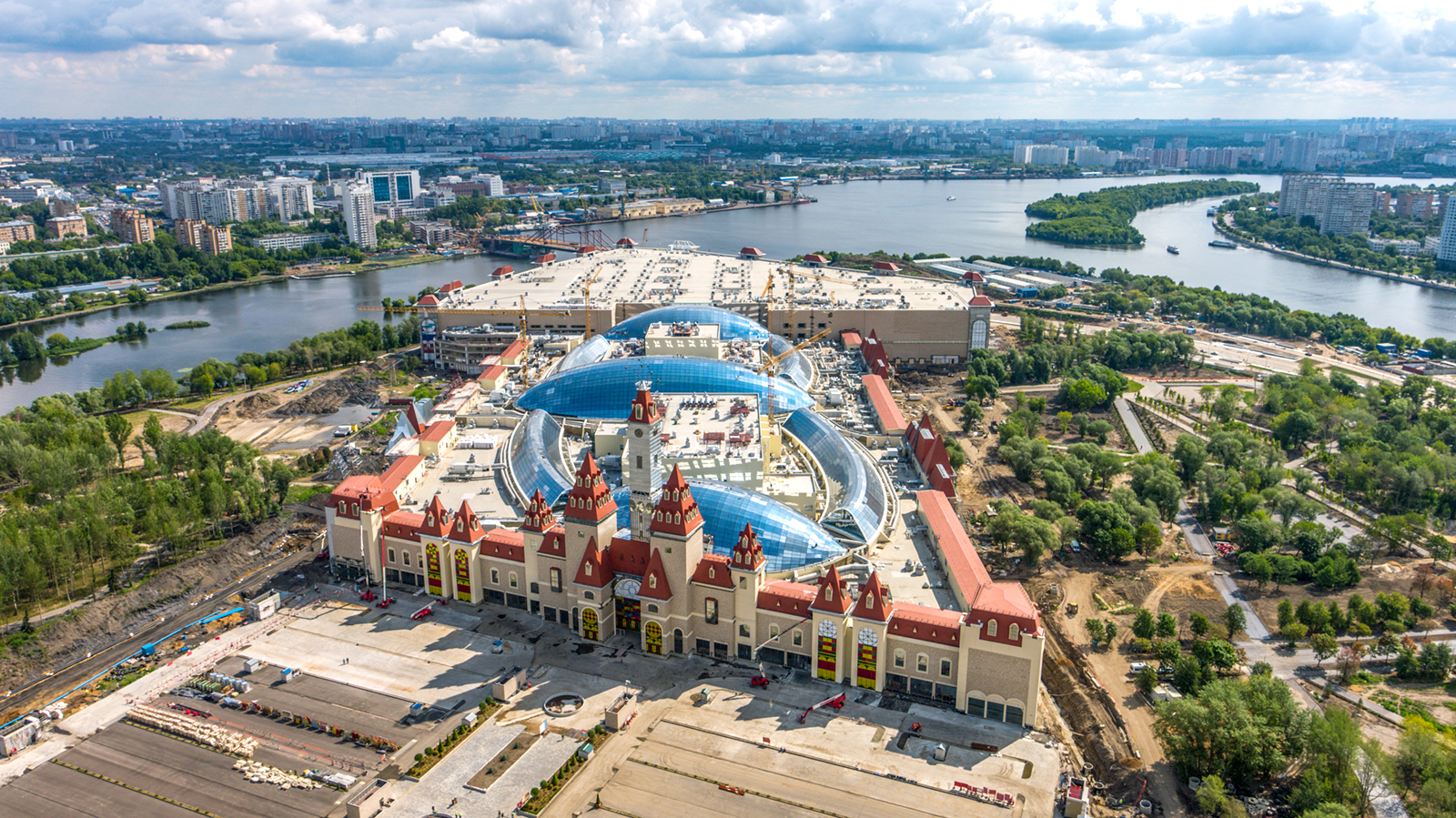
Dream Island, the largest indoor theme park in Europe

Izmaylovsky Park, created in 1931, is one of the world's largest urban parks, along with Richmond Park in London. With an area of 15.34 square kilometers (5.92 sq mi), Izmaylovsky Park is six times larger than Central Park in New York.

Bauman Garden, officially founded in 1920 and renamed in 1922 after the Bolshevik Nikolay Bauman, is one of the oldest parks in Moscow. It lies on the site of the former Golitsyn estate and eighteenth-century public garden.

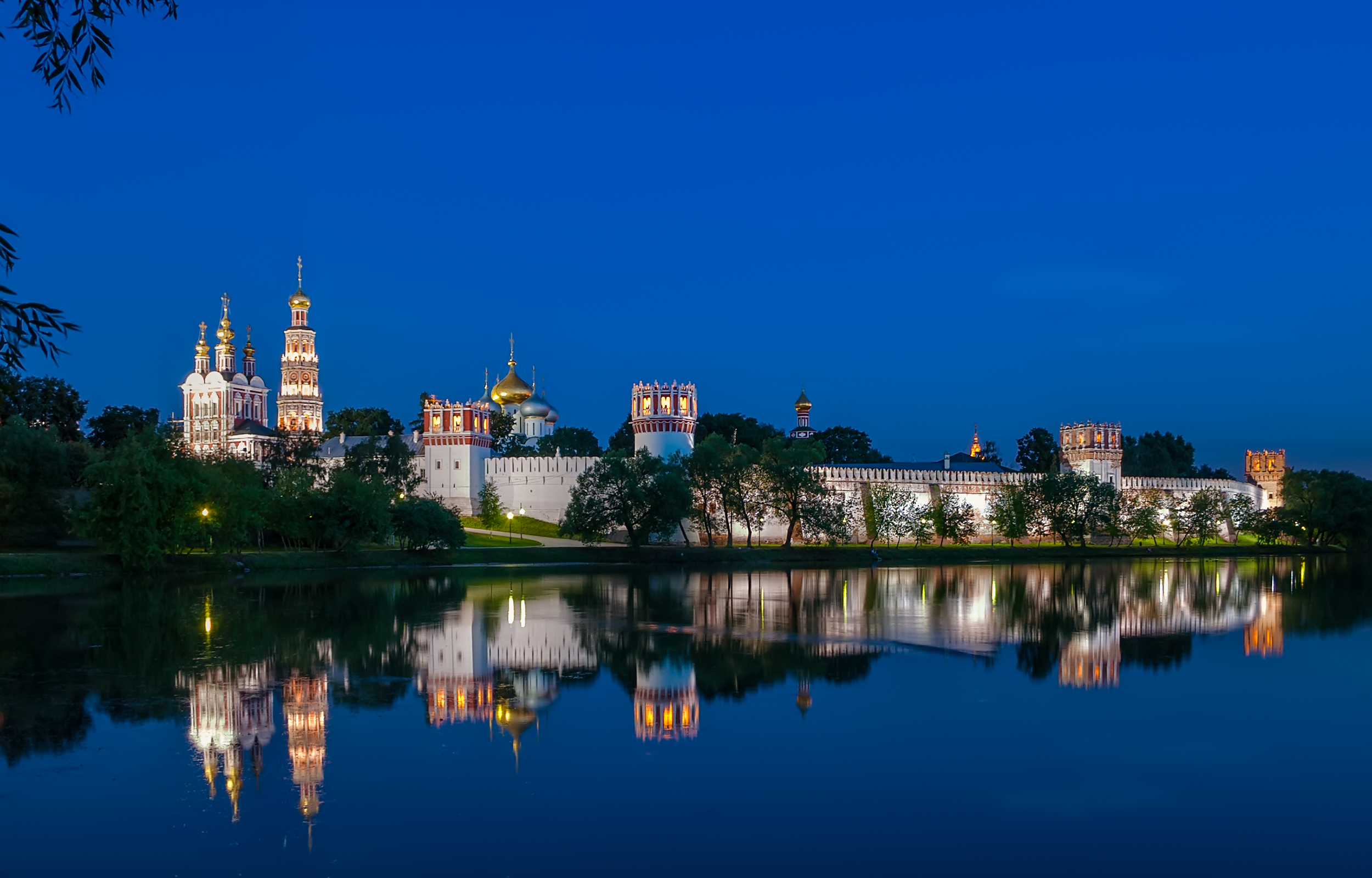
Novodevichy Convent is a UNESCO World Heritage Site.

Sokolniki Park, named after the falcon hunting that previously took place there, is one of the oldest parks in Moscow and has an area of 6 square kilometers (2.3 sq mi). It features a central circle with a large fountain surrounded by alleys of birches, maples, and elms. A labyrinth of green paths lies beyond the park's ponds.

Losiny Ostrov National Park ("Elk Island" National Park), more than 116 square kilometers (45 sq mi) in area, borders Sokolniki Park and was Russia's first national park. It is wild and known as the "city taiga"—the park contains elk.

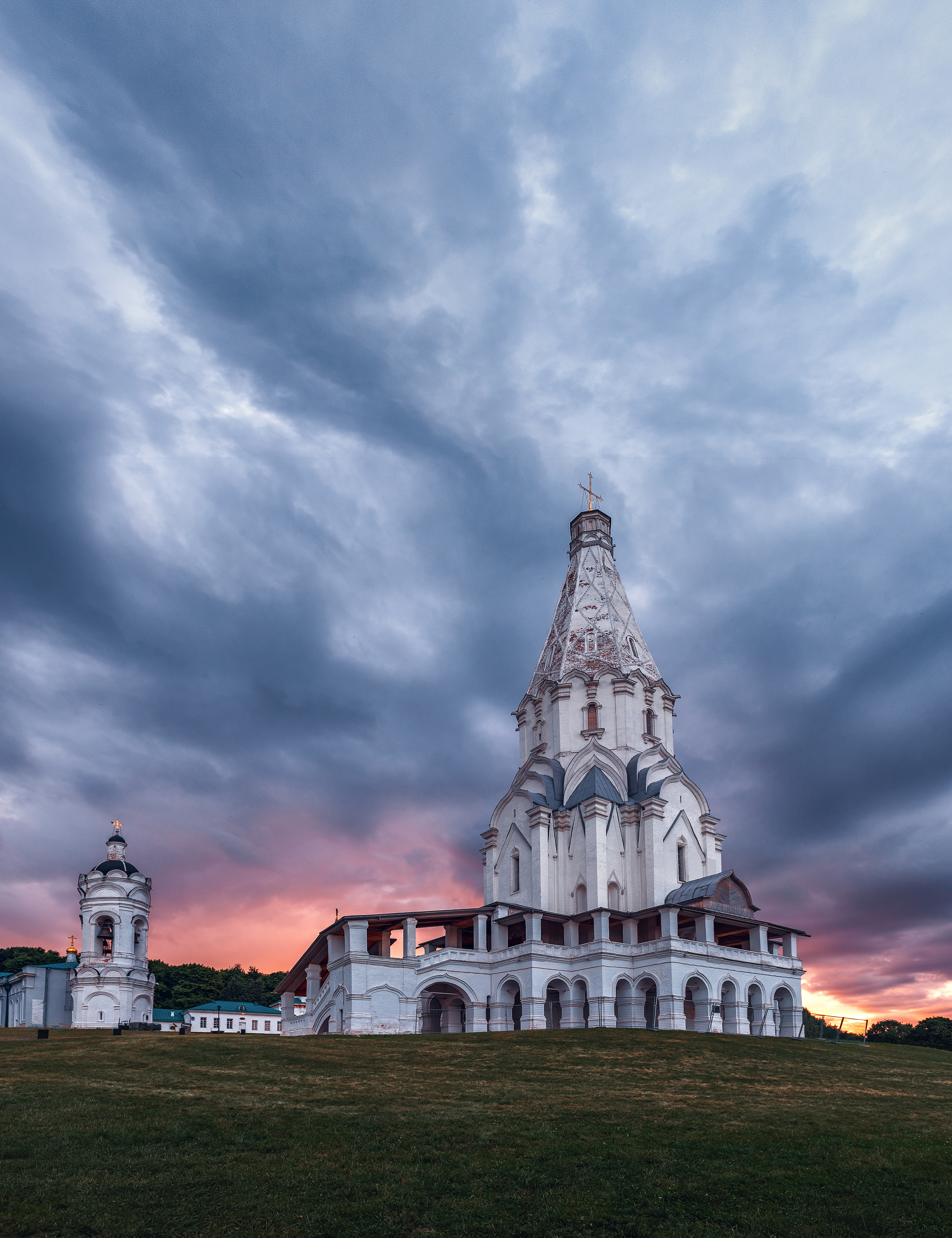
The Church of Ascension in Kolomenskoye is a UNESCO World Heritage Site.

The Tsitsin Main Botanical Garden of Academy of Sciences, founded in 1945, is the largest in Europe. This garden covers 3.61 square kilometers (1.39 sq mi) next to the All-Russia Exhibition Center; it contains a live exhibition of more than 20,000 species of plants from around the world, as well as a lab for scientific research. The garden contains a rosarium (with 20,000 rose bushes), a dendrarium, and an oak forest (whose average tree age exceeds 100 years). In addition, the garden contains a greenhouse occupying more than 5,000 square meters (53,820 square feet).

The All-Russian Exhibition Center (Russian: Всероссийский выставочный центр) was formerly known as the All-Union Agricultural Exhibition (VSKhV) and later the Exhibition of Achievements of the National Economy (VDNKh), though it was officially called a "permanent trade show". This center is a prominent example of Stalinist-era monumental architecture. In this large recreational park, there are scores of pavilions, each representing one of two things: a branch of Soviet industry and science, or a Soviet republic. During the 1990s, the center was—and to some extent still is—misused as a shopping center. (Most pavilions are rented to small businesses.) Nevertheless, the center retains most of its architectural landmarks, including two monumental fountains (Stone Flower and Friendship of Nations) and a 360-degree panoramic cinema. In 2014, the park reverted to the name Exhibition of Achievements of National Economy; that same year, a large renovation project was started.

Lilac Park, founded in 1958, contains a permanent sculpture display and a large rosarium.

Moscow has long been popular with tourists. Some well-known attractions include one of the city's UNESCO World Heritage Sites—the Moscow Kremlin and Red Square, which were built between the 14th and 17th centuries. The Church of the Ascension at Kolomenskoye, which dates from 1532, is another UNESCO World Heritage Site and a popular attraction.

Near the New Tretyakov Gallery, there is a sculpture garden, Museon—often called "the graveyard of fallen monuments"—that displays statues from the former Soviet Union that were removed from their places after the USSR's dissolution.

Other Moscow attractions include the Moscow Zoo, a zoological garden in two sections (the valleys of two streams) linked by a bridge, containing nearly 1,000 species and more than 6,500 specimens. Each year, the zoo attracts more than 1.2 million visitors.

Many of Moscow's parks and landscaped gardens are protected natural environments.

Zaryadye Park	VDNKh (Exhibition of Achievements of National Economy)	Victory Park on Poklonnaya Hill

== Moscow rings ==
Moscow's road system is approximately centered around the Kremlin at the city's core. From there, roads generally radiate outward to intersect with a series of circular roads ("rings"):

1. The first and innermost major ring, Bulvarnoye Koltso (Boulevard Ring), was built on the former location of the 16th-century city wall around Bely Gorod (White Town). The Bulvarnoye Koltso is technically not a ring: it forms an incomplete circle—a horseshoe-shaped arc beginning at the Cathedral of Christ the Saviour and ending at the Yauza River.
2. The second primary ring, located outside the Boulevard Ring, is the Sadovoye Koltso (Garden Ring). Like the Boulevard Ring, the Garden Ring follows the path of a 16th-century wall that previously encompassed part of Moscow.
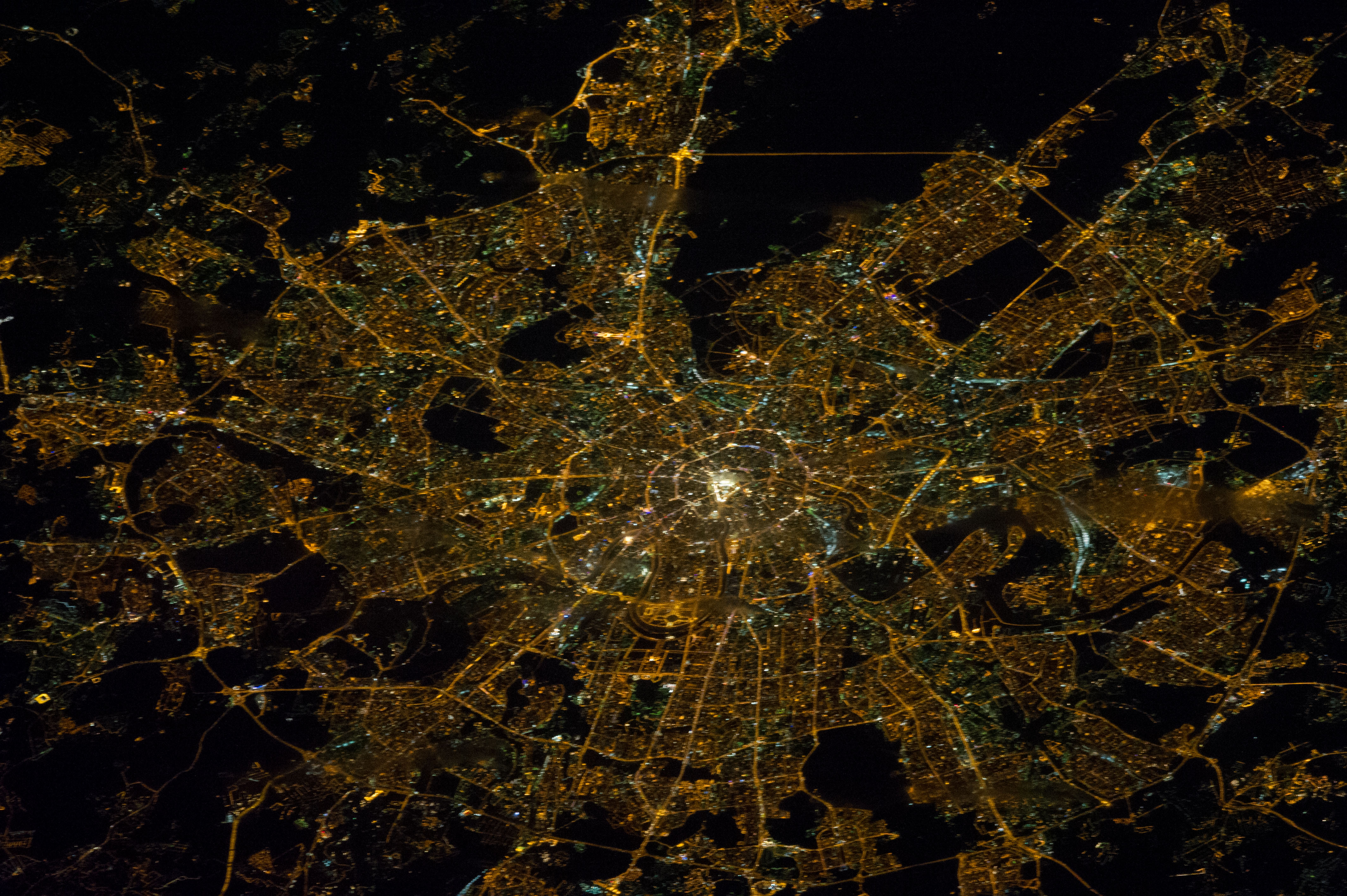
  Moscow as viewed from the International Space Station, 29 January 2014
3. The Third Ring Road was completed in 2003 as a high-speed freeway.
4. The Fourth Transport Ring—another freeway—was planned, but it was canceled in 2011. A system of chordal highways will be constructed instead.

In addition to these concentric ring roads, line 5 of the Moscow Metro is circular (hence its name Koltsevaya Liniya [lit. 'ring line']). It is located between the Garden Ring and the Third Transport Ring.

Two overlapping lines of the Moscow Metro form "two hearts":t

- Line 14: Since 10 September 2016, the Moscow Central Circle (MCC) renovated railroad (the former Moskovskaya Okruzhnaya Zheleznaya Doroga) has been operated as Line 14 of the Moscow Metro. This cone-shaped railroad opened in 1908 (as a freight-only railway from 1934 until the reopening in 2016).
- Line 11: Another circular metro line—the Big Circle Line (Bolshaya Koltsevaya Liniya)—opened its first stations in 2018 and the remaining stations in 2023. The Kakhovskaya-Savyolovskaya western half of the line was launched in late 2021.

The outermost ring within the city is the Moscow Ring Road—often called the MKAD, an acronym for the Russian Московская Кольцевая Автомобильная Дорога—which forms the city's cultural boundary; it was established during the 1950s. It was built at ground level, rather than being elevated, so it forms a barrier to roads that would otherwise pass beneath it. (Before Moscow's 2012 expansion, the MKAD was considered an approximate city boundary.)

Outside Moscow, some roads encompassing the city follow the same circular pattern as within city limits; notable examples are the Betonka roads (highways A107 and A108), originally constructed of concrete pads.

To reduce traffic on the MKAD, a new ring road—called CKAD, Centralnaya Koltsevaya Avtomobilnaya Doroga, Central Ring Road—was completed outside the MKAD in 2021.

=== Transport rings in Moscow ===
Length	Name	Type
9 km	Boulevard Ring—Bulvarnoye Koltso (a horseshoe-shaped arc)	Road
16 km	Garden Ring—Sadovoye Koltso ("B")	Road
19 km	Koltsevaya line (Line 5)	Metro
35 km	Third Ring Road—Third Transport Ring—Tretye Transportnoye Koltso (TTK)	Road
54 km	Little Ring of the Moscow Railway, reopened as Moscow Central Circle (MCC)—Line 14	Railway
57.4 km	Bolshaya Koltsevaya line—Line 11	Metro
109 km	Moscow Ring Road—Moskovskaya Koltsevaya Avtomobilnaya Doroga (MKAD)	Road

== Culture ==
=== Museums and galleries ===
A notable art museum in Moscow is the Tretyakov Gallery, which was founded by Pavel Tretyakov, a wealthy patron of the arts who donated a large private collection to the city. The Tretyakov Gallery is divided into two buildings. The Old Tretyakov Gallery—the original gallery in the Tretyakovskaya area on the south bank of the Moskva River—houses traditional Russian works. Art by pre-Revolutionary painters, such as Ilya Repin, as well as art by early Russian icon painters, is also displayed. In addition, the museum contains rare originals by early 15th-century iconographer Andrei Rublev. The New Tretyakov Gallery, created in Soviet times, contains primarily Soviet art, as well as a few contemporary paintings; however, the old and new buildings overlap for early 20th-century art. The new building includes a small reconstruction of Vladimir Tatlin's famous Monument to the Third International, as well as other avant-garde works by artists such as Kazimir Malevich and Wassily Kandinsky. Socialist realism also appears in the new building.

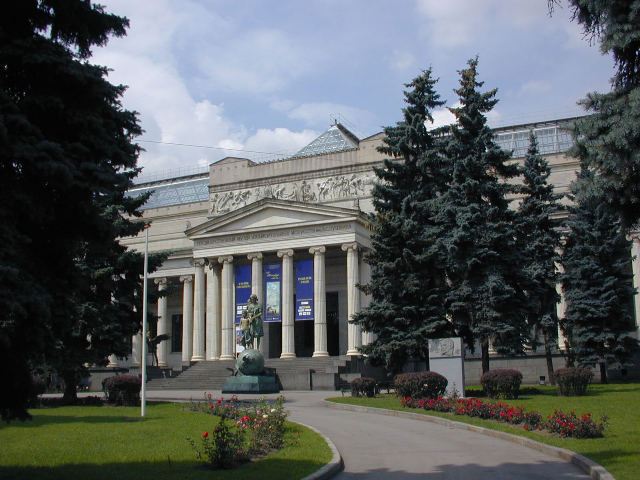
The Pushkin Museum of Fine Arts

Another art museum in Moscow is the Pushkin Museum of Fine Arts, which was founded by (among others) the father of poet Marina Tsvetaeva. The Pushkin Museum resembles the British Museum in London in having halls that offer a cross-section of exhibits on world civilizations, with many copies of ancient sculptures. However, the Pushkin Museum also houses paintings from major European eras; works by Claude Monet, Paul Cézanne, and Pablo Picasso are included in the museum's collection.

In addition, Moscow contains museums of history, technology, military history, and space exploration. The State Historical Museum of Russia (Russian: Государственный Исторический музей) is located between Red Square and Manege Square in Moscow. The museum's exhibitions range from relics of prehistoric tribes in the area of present-day Russia to valuable artworks acquired by the Romanov dynasty. The number of objects in the museum's collection totals several million. The Polytechnical Museum, founded in 1872, is the largest technical museum in Russia, offering an array of historical inventions and technological achievements—including humanoid automata from the 18th century and the earliest Soviet computers. The museum's collection contains more than 160,000 items. The Borodino Panorama museum, located on Kutuzov Avenue, provides an opportunity for visitors to simulate the experience of a battlefield with a 360° diorama. This museum is part of the large historical memorial commemorating victory in the Patriotic War of 1812 over Napoleon's army; this memorial also includes a triumphal arch erected in 1827. In addition, Moscow contains a military history museum containing statues and military hardware. The Memorial Museum of Cosmonautics under the Monument to the Conquerors of Space at the end of Cosmonauts Alley is the central memorial for Russian space officials.

The Shchusev State Museum of Architecture is the national museum of Russian architecture, named after the architect Alexey Shchusev. This museum is located near the Kremlin.

Moscow will gain a branch of the Hermitage Museum in 2024. Authorities have agreed on the final project, which will be executed by Hani Rashid, co-founder of the New York-based firm Asymptote Architecture. This firm handled the stock market building in Moscow, the World Business Center Solomon Tower in Busan, and the Strata Tower in Abu Dhabi.

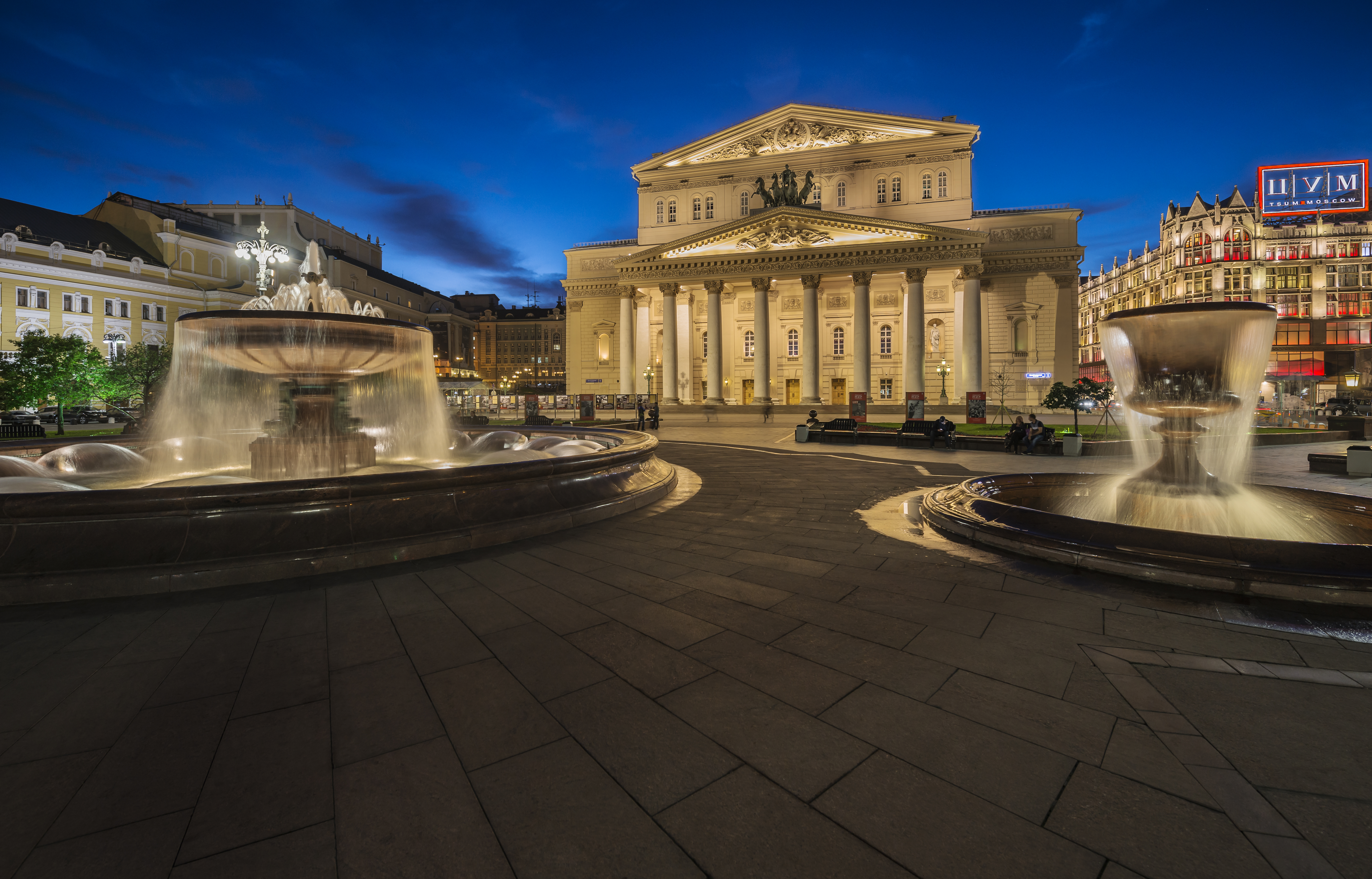
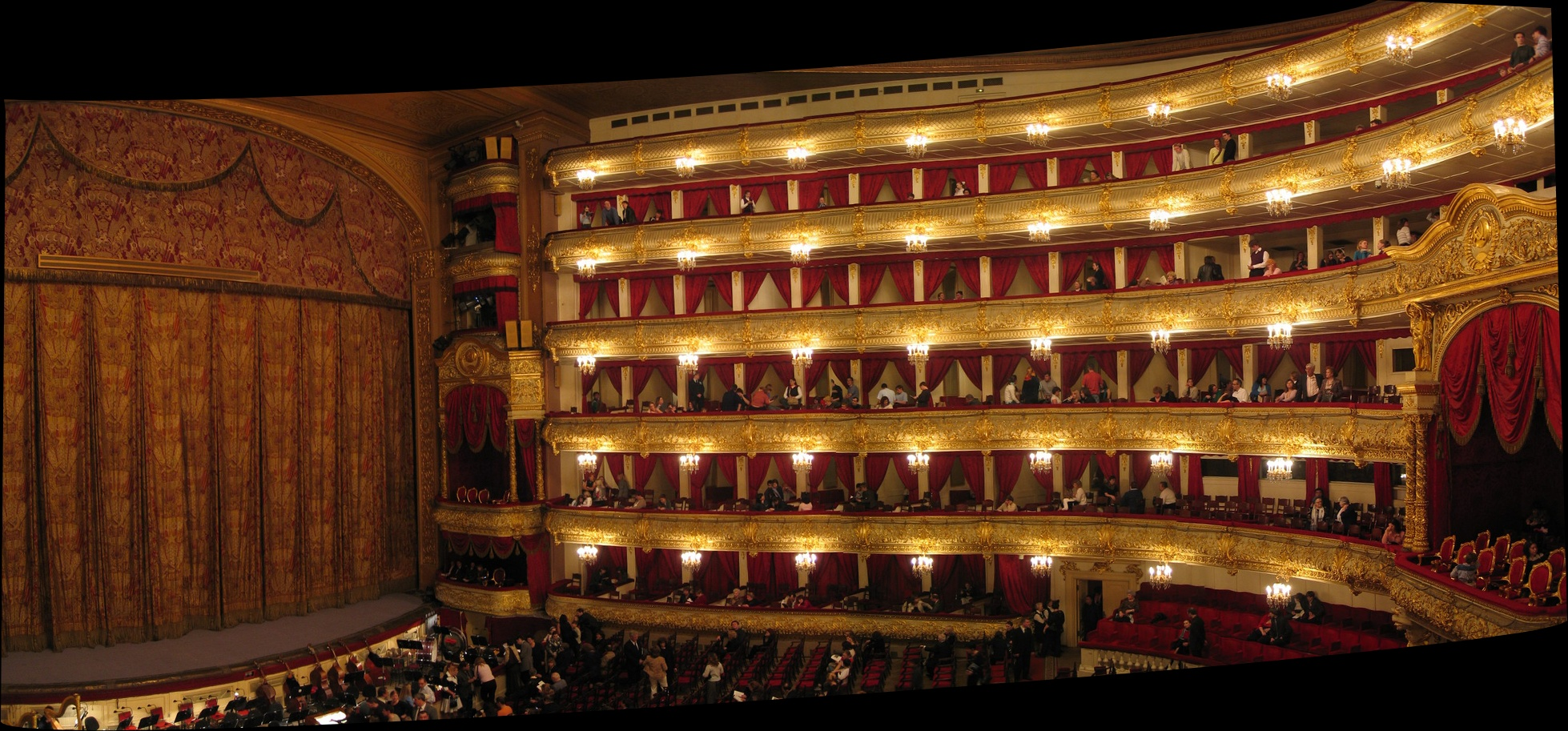
The Bolshoi Theatre

=== Performing arts and cinema ===
Moscow is the heart of Russian performing arts, including ballet and cinema: 68 museums, 103 theaters, 132 cinemas, and 24 concert halls. Among Moscow's theaters and ballet studios are the Bolshoi Theatre, the Malyi Theatre, the Vakhtangov Theatre, and the Moscow Art Theatre.

The Moscow International Performance Arts Center, opened in 2003—also called the Moscow International House of Music—is known for classical music performances. This center contains Russia's largest organ, which is installed in Svetlanov Hall.

In addition, Moscow contains two large circuses: the Moscow State Circus and the Moscow Circus on Tsvetnoy Boulevard (also called Nikulin's Circus, after Yuri Nikulin).

The Mosfilm studio was at the heart of many classic films, as it has been responsible for both artistic and mainstream productions. However, despite the ongoing participation and reputation of internationally known Russian filmmakers, previously prolific domestic studios have become less active. The Salut cinema screens rare and historical films, and films from the Museum of Cinema are regularly shown. International film festivals are held in Moscow, including the Moscow International Film Festival, Stalker (focusing on human rights), Artdocfest (focusing on documentaries), and the Moscow Jewish Film Festival.

== Sports ==
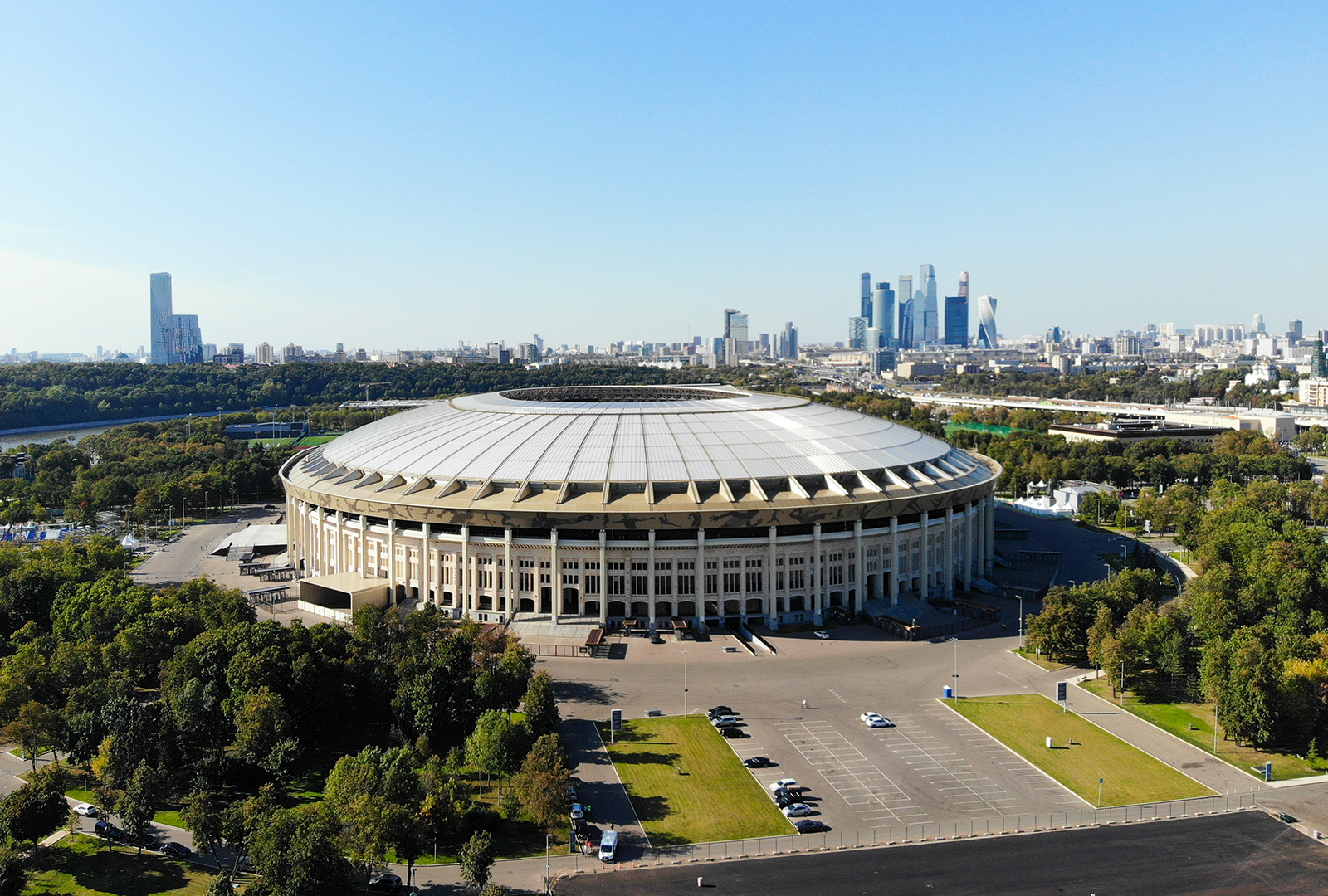
The Luzhniki Stadium hosted the 1980 Summer Olympics and the 2018 FIFA World Cup Final.

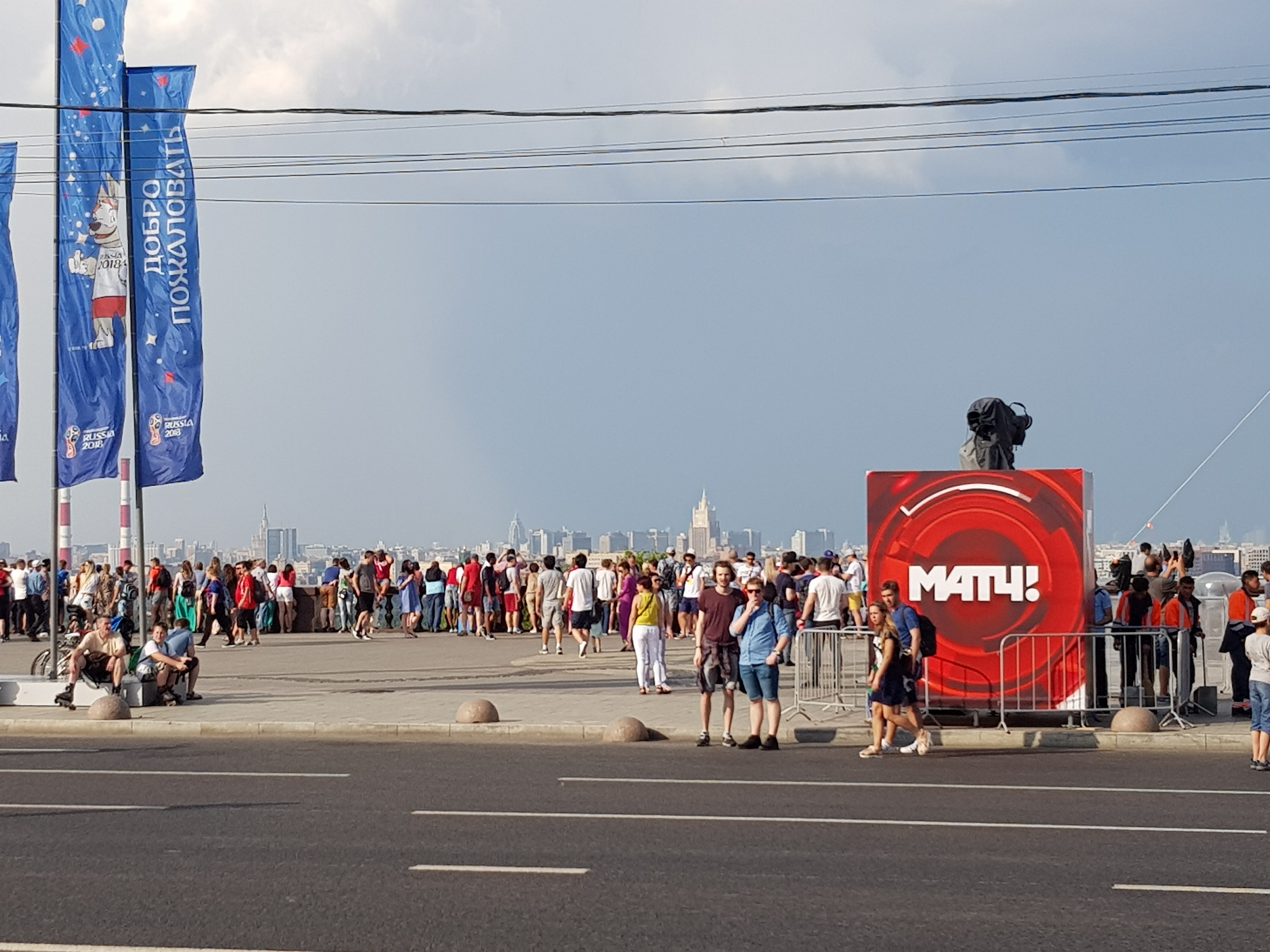
Sparrow Hills fan zone during the 2018 FIFA World Cup

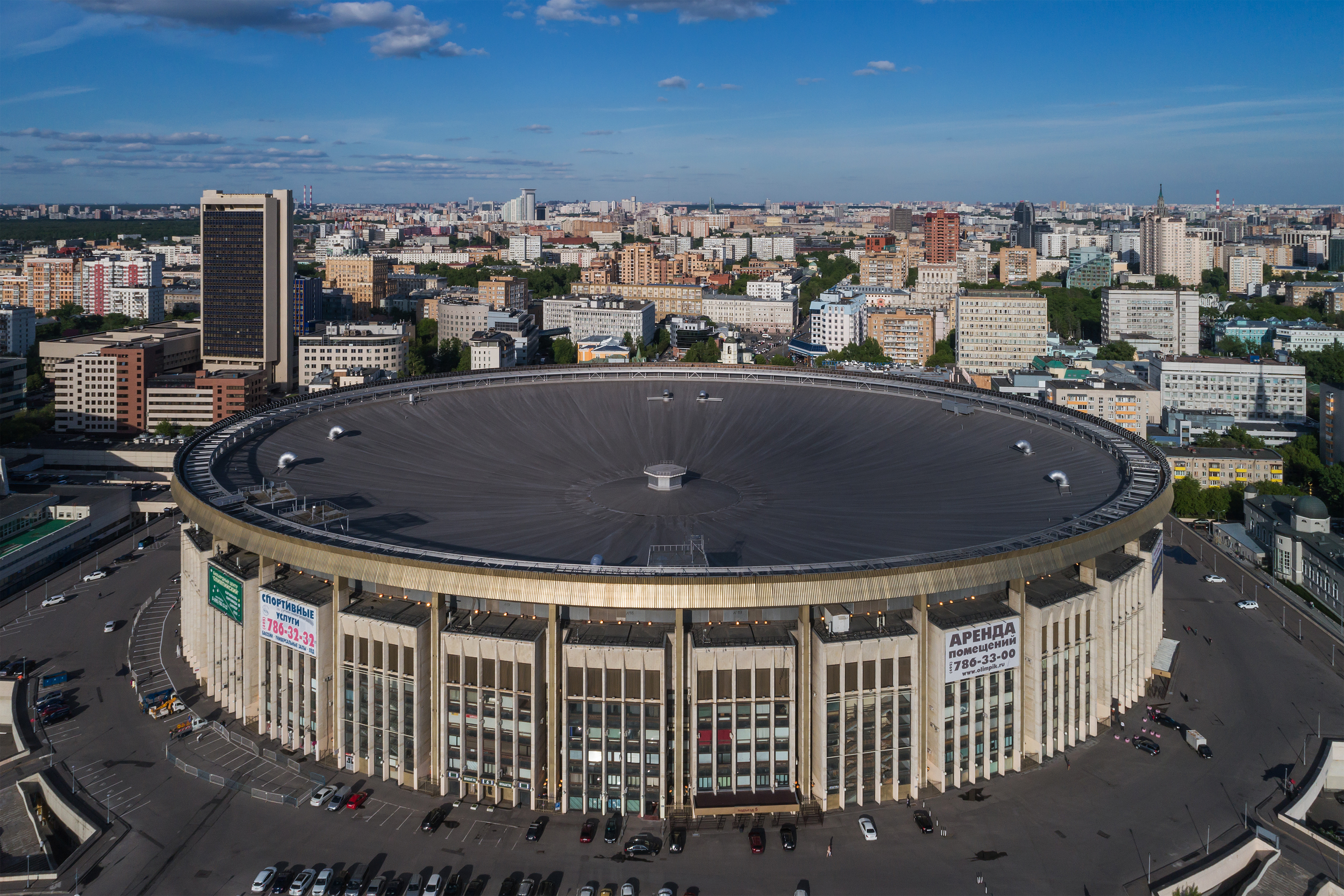
The SC Olimpiyskiy stadium was constructed for the 1980 Summer Olympics.

More than 500 Olympic champions lived in Moscow as of 2005. The city contains 63 stadiums—in addition to 8 football and 11 light athletics maneges (indoor sports halls); of these, Luzhniki Stadium is the largest in Moscow and the fourth largest in Europe. This stadium hosted the 1998–99 UEFA Cup, the 2007–08 UEFA Champions League finals, the 1980 Summer Olympics, and the 2018 FIFA World Cup (with 7 games in total, including the final). Forty other sports complexes are located in the city, including 24 complexes featuring artificial ice. The Olympic Stadium in Moscow was the world's first indoor arena for bandy, and it hosted the Bandy World Championship twice. Moscow hosted this competition again in 2010, at the Krylatskoye rink. This rink has also hosted the World Speed Skating Championships. In addition, Moscow contains seven horse racing tracks, of which the Central Moscow Hippodrome (founded in 1834) is the largest.

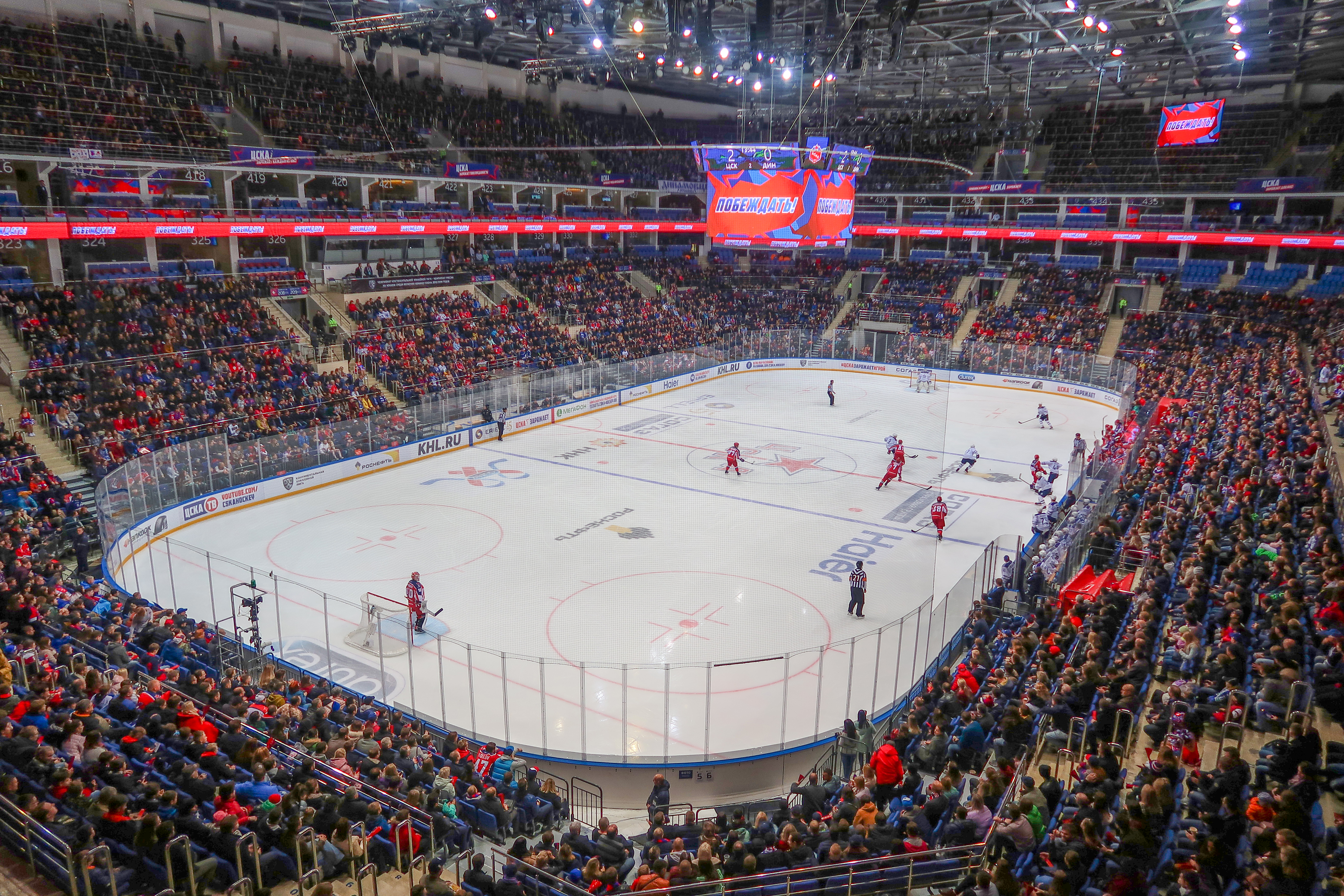
CSKA Arena during a game of the Kontinental Hockey League (KHL), considered to be the world's second-best ice hockey league

Moscow hosted the 1980 Summer Olympics; the yachting events were held in Tallinn, Estonia (then the Estonian Soviet Socialist Republic). Large sports facilities and the main international airport—Sheremetyevo Terminal 2—were constructed to prepare for the 1980 Summer Olympics. Moscow had previously bid for the 2012 Summer Olympics. However, when final voting began on 6 July 2005, Moscow was the first city to be eliminated; those Games were awarded to London.

HC CSKA Moscow is the most titled ice hockey team in the Soviet Union and Europe. Other large ice hockey clubs from Moscow are HC Dynamo Moscow (which was the second most titled team in the Soviet Union) and HC Spartak Moscow.

The most titled Soviet and Russian club—and one of the most titled Euroleague clubs—is the basketball club from Moscow, PBC CSKA Moscow. Moscow hosted the EuroBasket tournament in 1953 and 1965.

Among competing cities, Moscow had the most winners at the USSR Chess Championship and the Russian Chess Championship.

The most titled volleyball team in the Soviet Union and in Europe (the CEV Champions League) is VC CSKA Moscow.

In football (also known as soccer), FC Spartak Moscow has won the most championship titles in the Russian Premier League. The team was second only to FC Dynamo Kyiv in Soviet times. PFC CSKA Moscow was the first Russian football team to win a UEFA title, the UEFA Cup (the contemporary UEFA Europa League). FC Lokomotiv Moscow, FC Dynamo Moscow, and FC Torpedo Moscow are other professional football teams that are based in Moscow.

Arenas in Moscow

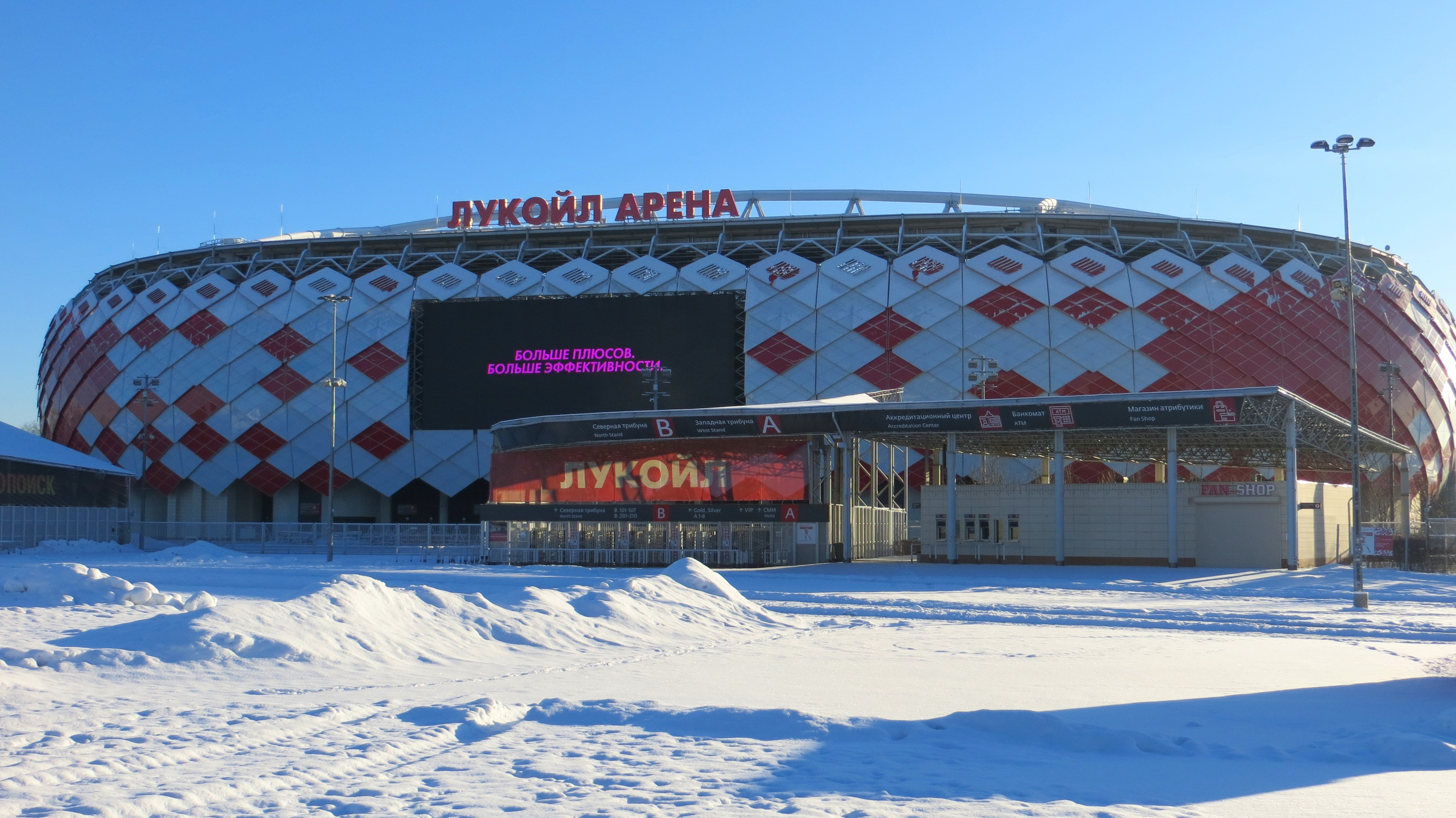
Lukoil Arena, home of FC Spartak Moscow

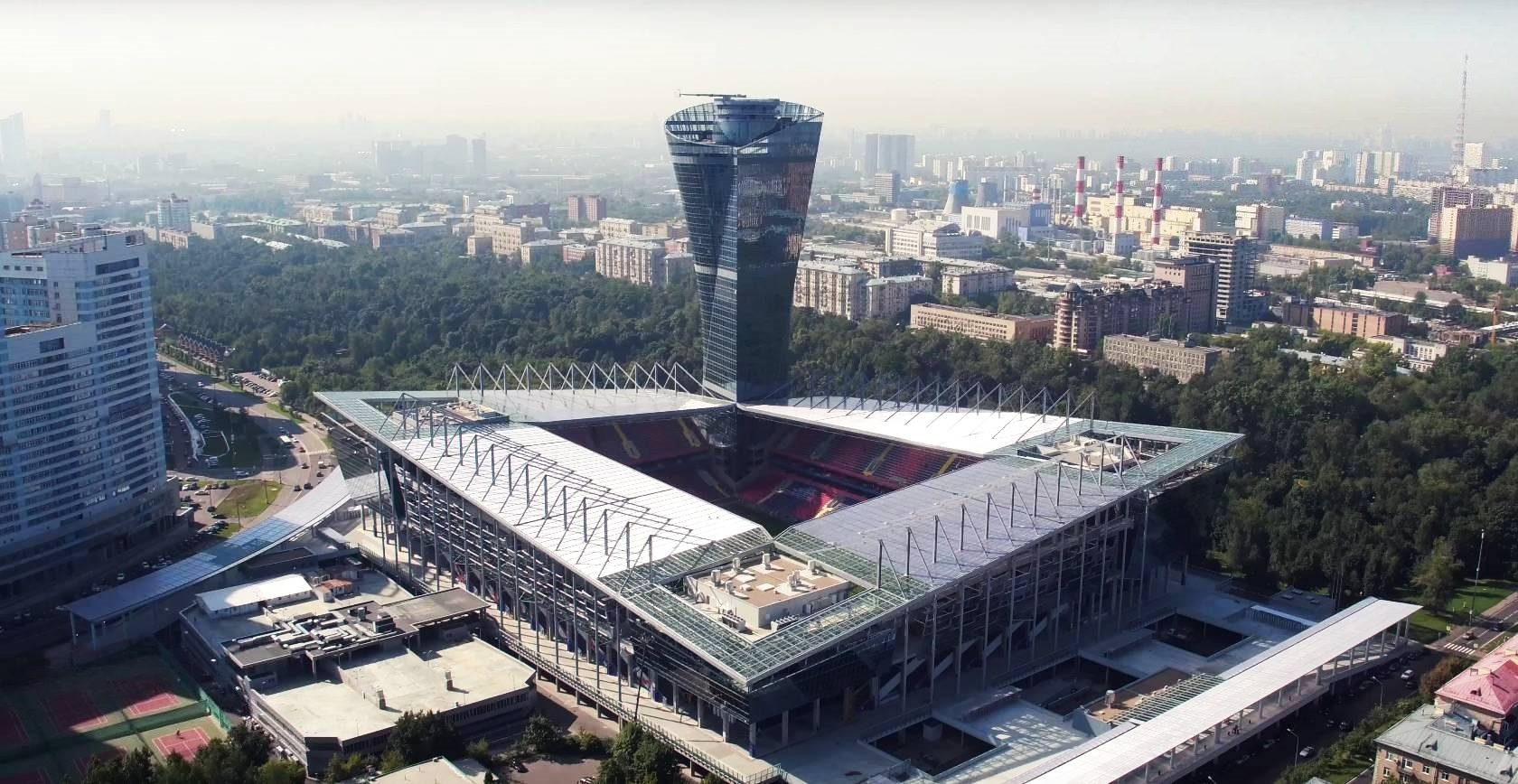
VEB Arena, home of PFC CSKA Moscow

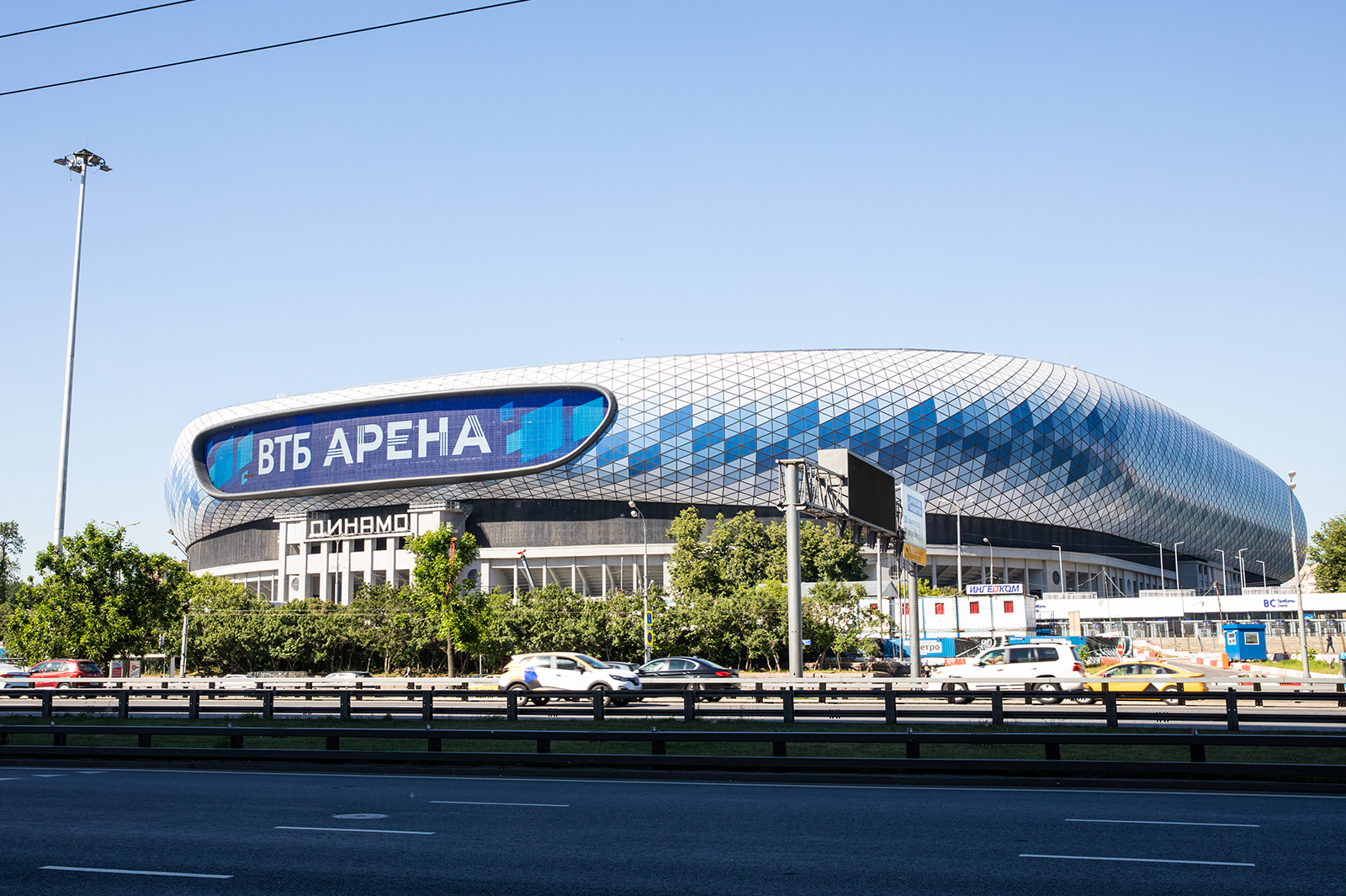
VTB Arena, home of FC Dynamo Moscow and HC Dynamo Moscow

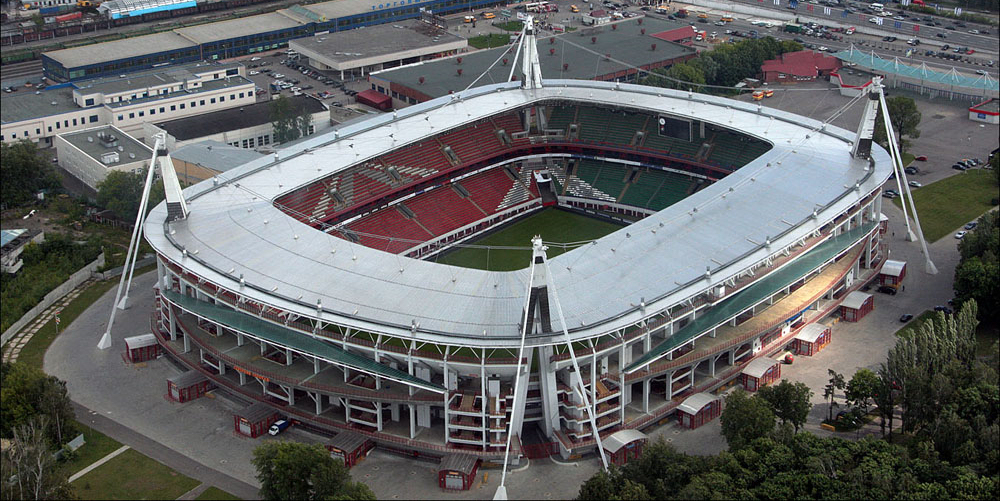
RZD Arena, home of FC Lokomotiv Moscow

Other major football, ice hockey, and basketball teams are based in Moscow. Because sports organizations in the Soviet Union were once centralized, two of the best Union-level teams represented defense and law-enforcement agencies: the Armed Forces (CSKA) and the Ministry of Internal Affairs (Dinamo). Most major cities had army and police sports teams. As a result, Spartak, CSKA, and Dinamo were among the best-funded teams in the USSR.

The Irina Viner-Usmanova Gymnastics Palace is located in the Luzhniki Olympic Complex. Construction of the Palace started in 2017, and the opening ceremony took place on 18 June 2019. The Palace was financed by billionaire Alisher Usmanov, husband of the former gymnast and gymnastics coach Irina Viner-Usmanova. The total area of the building is 23,500 square meters (253,000 sq ft), which includes three fitness rooms, locker rooms, rooms for referees and coaches, saunas, a canteen, a cafeteria, two ball halls, a medical center, a hall for journalists, and a hotel for athletes.

Because of Moscow's cold climate, winter sports are popular. Many of Moscow's parks offer marked trails for skiing and frozen ponds for skating.

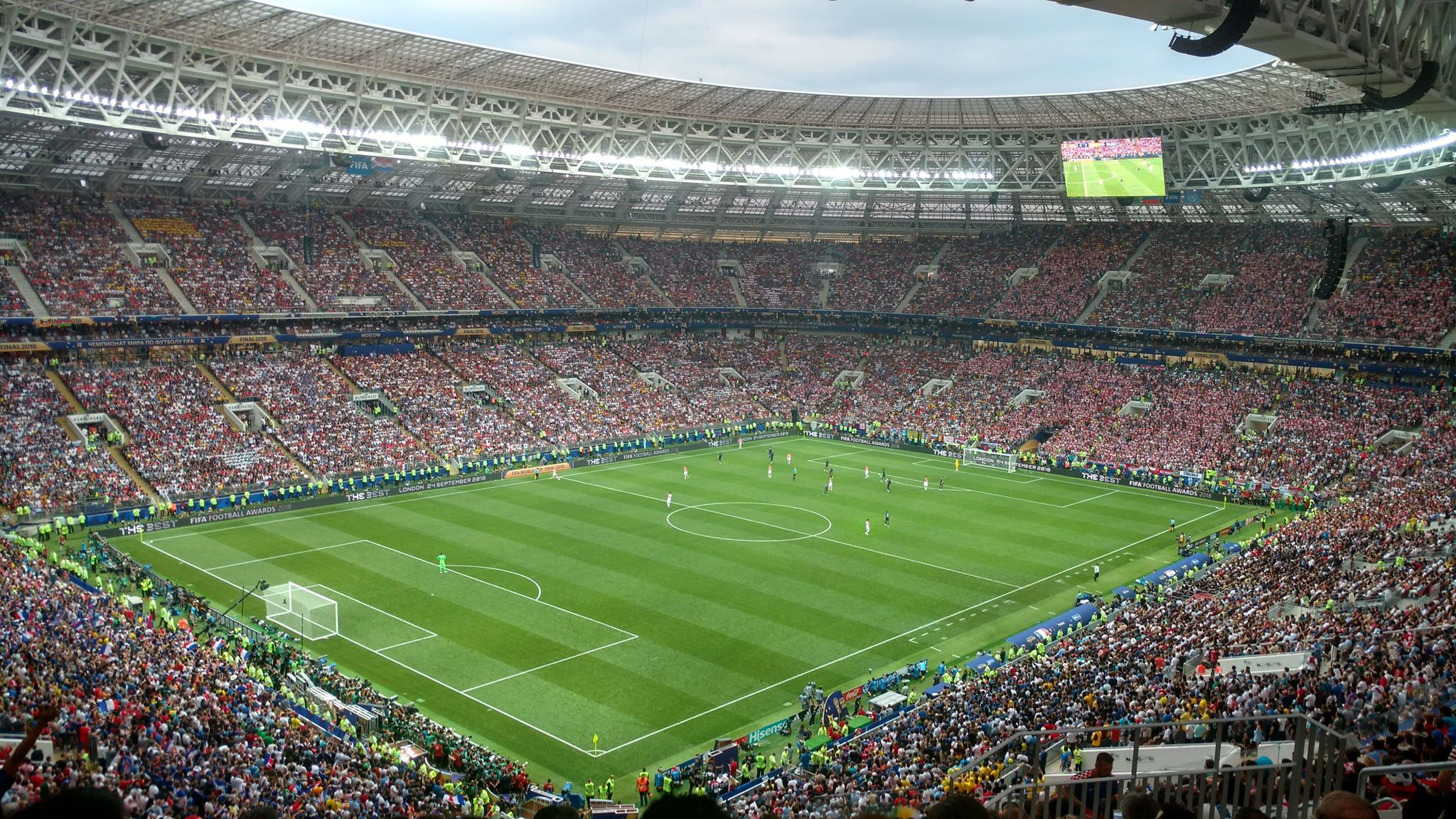
The Luzhniki Stadium in Moscow, which hosted games for the 2018 FIFA World Cup

Moscow hosts the annual Kremlin Cup, a tennis tournament on both the Women's Tennis Association (WTA) and the Association of Tennis Professionals (ATP) tours. This tournament is one of ten Tier-I events on the women's tour, and Russian players participate every year.

The SC Olimpiyskiy arena hosted the Eurovision Song Contest 2009, the first and to date the only Eurovision Song Contest held in Russia.

Slava Moscow is a professional rugby club, competing in the national Professional Rugby League. Former champions RC Lokomotiv joined this league in 2011. The Luzhniki Stadium hosted the 2013 Rugby World Cup Sevens.

In bandy (a ball game on ice), an internationally successful club is the 22-time Russian League champion Dynamo Moscow. It has also won the World Cup three times and the European Cup six times.

Moscow's MFK Dinamo Moskva club is important in European futsal (football variant), having once won the Futsal Champions League title.

When Russia was selected to host the 2018 FIFA World Cup, the Luzhniki Stadium's capacity was increased by almost 10,000 seats; in addition, two new stadiums were built: the Dynamo Stadium and the Spartak Stadium (although Dynamo was later excluded from hosting World Cup matches).

Football clubs in Moscow
Club	Founded	League	League rank	Stadium
Spartak Moscow	1922	Premier League	1st	Lukoil Arena
CSKA Moscow	1911	Premier League	1st	VEB Arena
Lokomotiv Moscow	1923	Premier League	1st	RZD Arena
Dynamo Moscow	1923	Premier League	1st	VTB Arena
Torpedo Moscow	1924	First League	2nd	Eduard Streltsov Stadium
Rodina Moscow	2015	First League	2nd	Spartakovets Stadium
Veles Moscow	2016	Second League	3rd	Avangard Stadium

== Entertainment ==
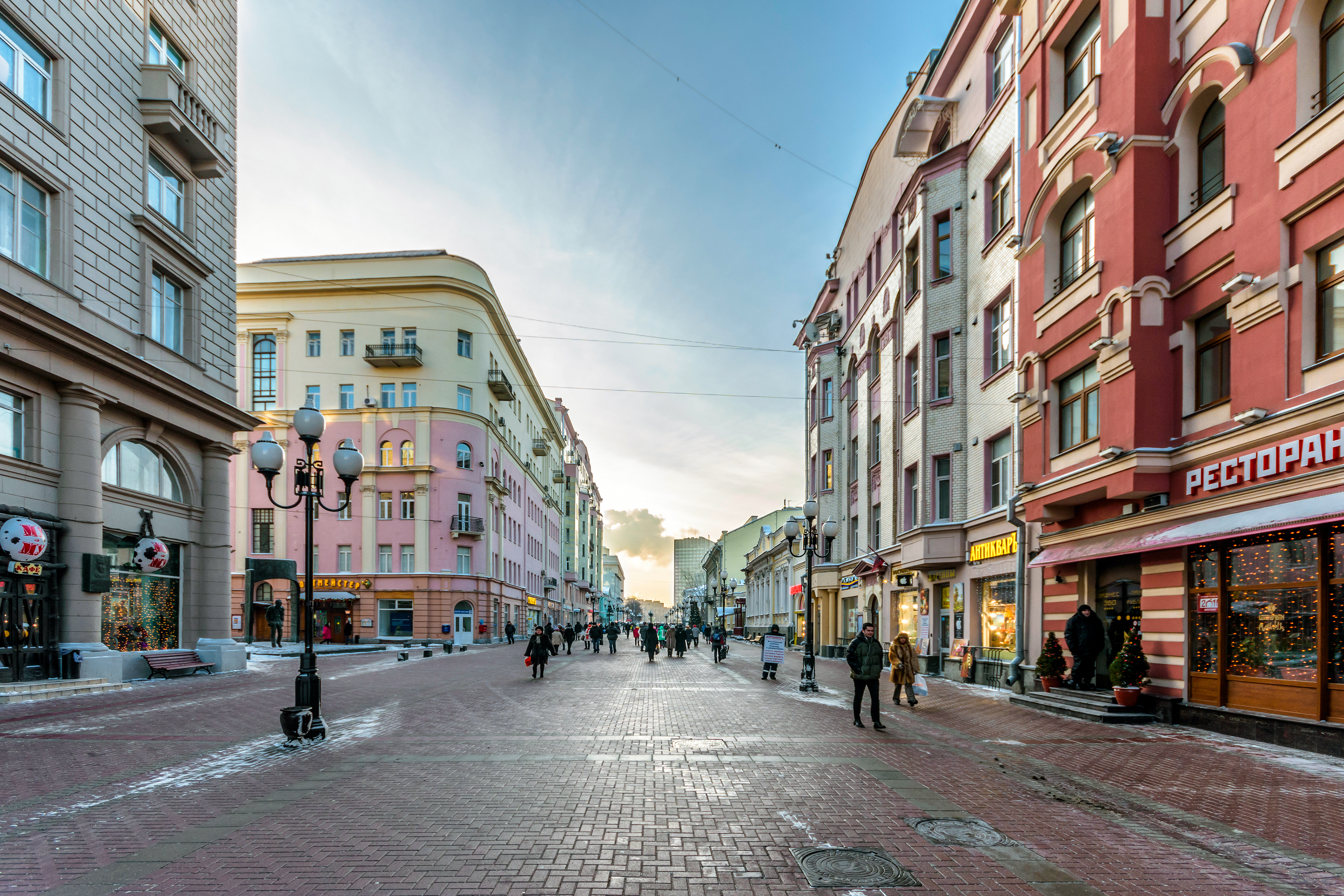
Arbat Street, in the historical center of Moscow

Moscow contains many clubs, restaurants, and bars. Tverskaya Street is one of the city's busiest shopping streets.

South of Tverskaya Street, in the Kitay-gorod (lit. 'Chinatown') area, the adjoining Tretyakovsky Proyezd has upscale stores such as Bulgari, Tiffany & Co., Armani, Prada, and Bentley. Nightlife in Moscow has progressed since Soviet times; the contemporary city has some of the world's largest nightclubs. The most fashionable area is near an old chocolate factory; this area includes bars, nightclubs, galleries, cafés, and restaurants.

Dream Island is a Moscow amusement park that opened on 29 February 2020. It is the largest indoor theme park in Europe. The park covers 300,000 square meters (74 acres). The complex includes a landscaped park, along with a concert hall, a cinema, a hotel, a children's sailing school, restaurants, and shops.

== Authorities ==
=== Moscow authorities ===
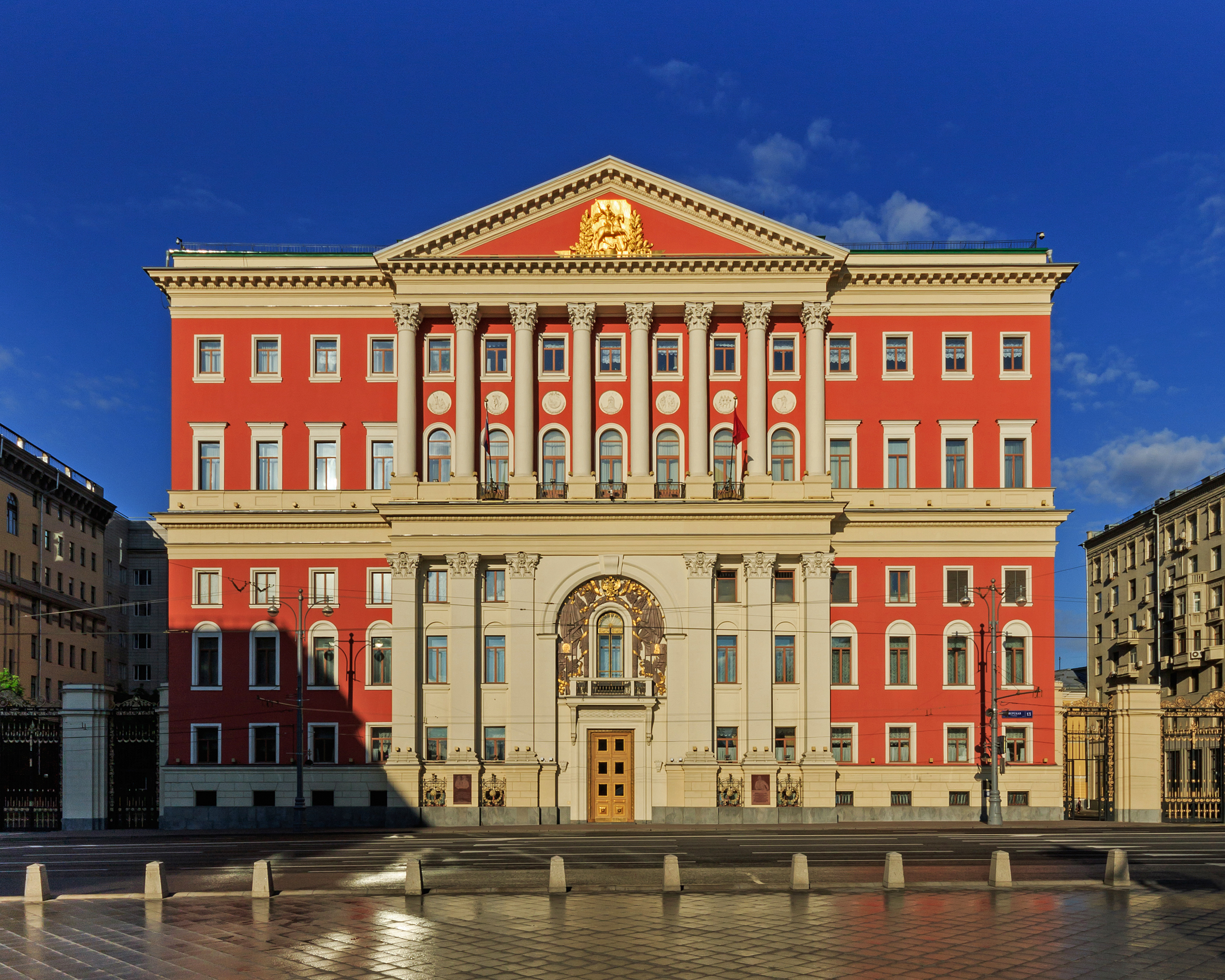
Moscow City Hall Building

According to the Constitution of the Russian Federation, Moscow is an independent federal subject of the Russian Federation, a city of federal importance.

The Mayor of Moscow is the leading official in the executive, leading the Government of Moscow, which is the highest organ of executive power. The Moscow City Duma is the city duma (city council or local parliament), and local laws must be approved by it. It includes 45 members who are elected for a five-year term on a single-mandate constituency basis.

From 2006 to 2012, direct elections of the mayor were not held because of changes in the Charter of the city of Moscow, with the mayor appointed by presidential decree. The first direct elections since the 2003 vote were scheduled to be held after the expiration of the then-current mayor's term in 2015; however, because he voluntarily resigned, these elections took place in September 2013.

Local administration is carried out through 11 prefectures—which unify Moscow's districts into administrative districts on a territorial basis—and 125 regional administrations. According to the law "On the organization of local self-government in the city of Moscow", since the beginning of 2003, the executive bodies of local self-government are municipalities; representative bodies are municipal assemblies, whose members are elected in accordance with the Charter of the intracity municipality.

=== Federal authorities ===
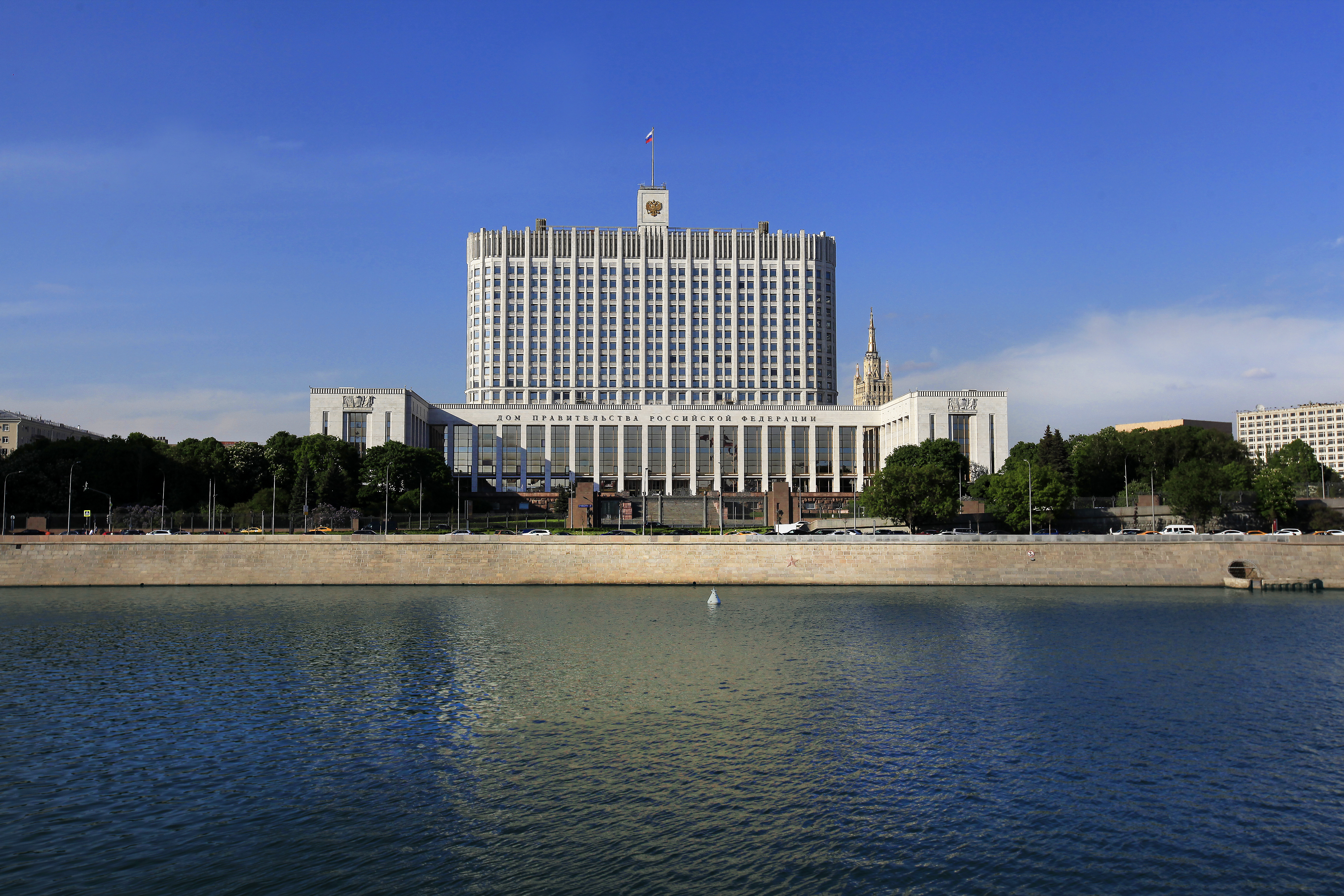
The House of the Government of the Russian Federation

Moscow, as the city designated by the Constitution of the Russian Federation as the seat of federal authority, contains the country's federal legislative, executive, and judicial authorities—except for the Constitutional Court of the Russian Federation, which has been located in Saint Petersburg since 2008.

The supreme executive authority—the Government of the Russian Federation—is located in the House of the Government of the Russian Federation (the White House) on the Krasnopresnenskaya Embankment in the center of Moscow. The State Duma is on Okhotny Ryad (street). The Federation Council is in a building on Bolshaya Dmitrovka (street). The Supreme Court of the Russian Federation is also in Moscow.

The Moscow Kremlin is the official residence of the President of the Russian Federation. The president's working residence in the Kremlin is located in the Senate Palace.

=== Safety ===
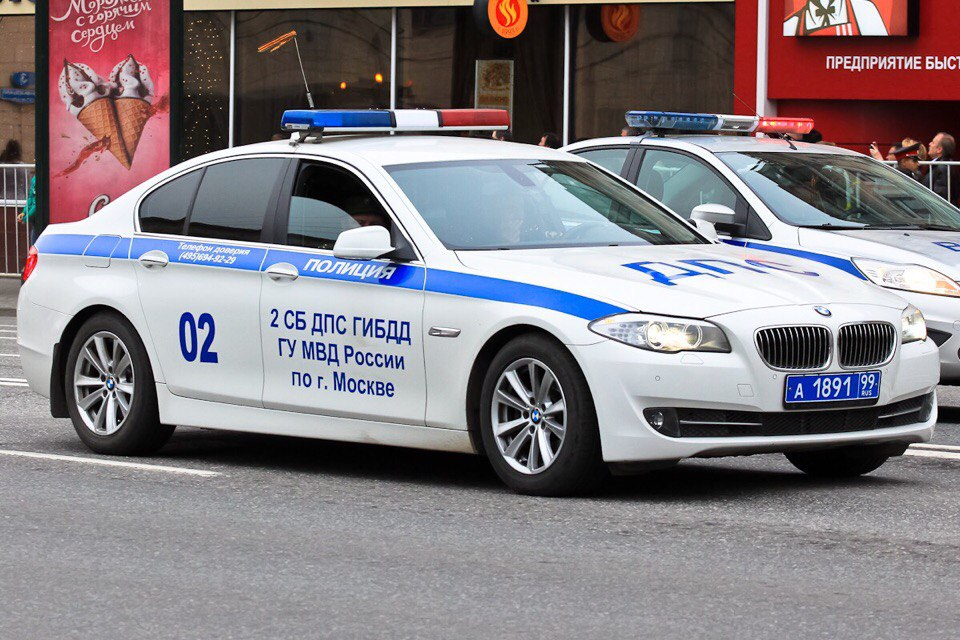
A BMW 5 Series patrol car of the Moscow Police

In a ranking of cities by safety that was prepared by The Economist newspaper in 2021, Moscow was ranked 38th with a score of 62.5 points. The general level of crime is low. More than 170,000 surveillance cameras in Moscow are connected to a facial recognition system. The authorities approved of a two-month experiment with automatic, real-time recognition of faces, gender, and age of people; so these authorities deployed the system around the entire city. A video surveillance network integrates video cameras in 95% of the city's apartment buildings; on the grounds and inside buildings of schools and kindergartens; and in MCC stations, stadiums, public transit stops, bus stations, parks, and underground passages.

Moscow's emergency numbers match those in all other regions of Russia:

- 112—single emergency
- 101—the Fire Service and the Ministry of Emergency Situations
- 102—the police
- 103—ambulance
- 104—gas emergency

== Administrative divisions ==
Federal city of Moscow
Coat of arms	
Administrative divisions	12
Districts	125
Settlements	21

Moscow's 12 administrative districts
1. Central Administrative Okrug; 2. Northern Administrative Okrug; 3. North-Eastern Administrative Okrug; 4. Eastern Administrative Okrug; 5. South-Eastern Administrative Okrug; 6. Southern Administrative Okrug; 7. South-Western Administrative Okrug; 8. Western Administrative Okrug; 9. North-Western Administrative Okrug; 10. Zelenogradsky Administrative Okrug; 11. Novomoskovsky Administrative Okrug; 12. Troitsky Administrative Okrug

Changes in Moscow's territory from 1922 to 1995

The city of Moscow is led by a single mayor, Sergey Sobyanin. The city is divided into 12 administrative okrugs and 125 districts.

Moscow's urban planning appeared as early as the 12th century, when the city was founded. The city center grew by amalgamating with suburbs, in keeping with medieval principles of urban development, as strong fortress walls gradually spread along the circular streets of adjacent new settlements. The first circular defense walls established the trajectory for Moscow's rings, laying the groundwork for future city planning.

The following fortifications served as the city's circular defense boundaries at some point in history:

- the Kremlin walls
- Zemlyanoy Gorod (Earthwork Town)
- the Kamer-Kollezhsky Rampart
- the Garden Ring
- the small railway ring

The Moscow Ring Road (MKAD) has been Moscow's boundary since 1960. Similarly circular are the main Moscow subway line, the Ring Line, and the so-called Third Automobile Ring (which was completed in 2005). Thus, radial and circular planning continues to define Moscow's development. However, contemporary Moscow has also absorbed a number of areas outside the MKAD—such as Solntsevo, Butovo, and the town of Zelenograd. Part of Moscow Oblast's territory was merged into Moscow on 1 July 2012; as a result, Moscow is no longer fully surrounded by Moscow Oblast, and the city now shares a border with Kaluga Oblast. In total, Moscow gained about 1,500 square kilometers (580 sq mi) and 230,000 inhabitants. Moscow's Mayor Sergey Sobyanin praised this expansion as helping Moscow and the neighboring region, a "mega-city" of 20 million people, to develop "harmonically".

Each administrative okrug and district has its own coat of arms and flag, as well as an individual leader.

In addition to the districts, there are Territorial Units with Special Status. These units usually include areas with small or no permanent populations. Examples include the All-Russia Exhibition Centre, the Botanical Garden, large parks, and industrial zones. In recent years, some territories have been merged with other districts. Moscow has no ethnic-specific areas, such as the Chinatowns in certain North American and East Asian cities. Although districts are not formally designated by income, areas closer to the city center, metro stations, or green zones are considered more prestigious.

Moscow also contains some government bodies of the Moscow Oblast, although the city is not part of the oblast.

== Economy ==
=== Overview ===
Largest private companies based in Moscow (ranked by 2019 revenues)
Moscow	Corporation	Russia
1	Lukoil	1
2	X5 Retail Group	3
3	Novatek	6
4	Nornickel	9
5	UC Rusal	11
6	Sibur	13
7	SUEK	15
8	MTS	17
9	Metalloinvest	18
10	EuroChem	21
11	MegaFon	22
12	M.video	24
13	TMK	25
14	Mechel	26
Source: Forbes

Moscow has one of the largest municipal economies in Europe, and the city accounts for more than a fifth of Russia's gross domestic product (GDP). As of 2021, Moscow's Gross Regional Product (GRP) reached almost ₽24.5 trillion (US$332 billion). The Gross Metropolitan Product (GMP) of the Moscow Region was ₽31.3 trillion (around $425 billion).

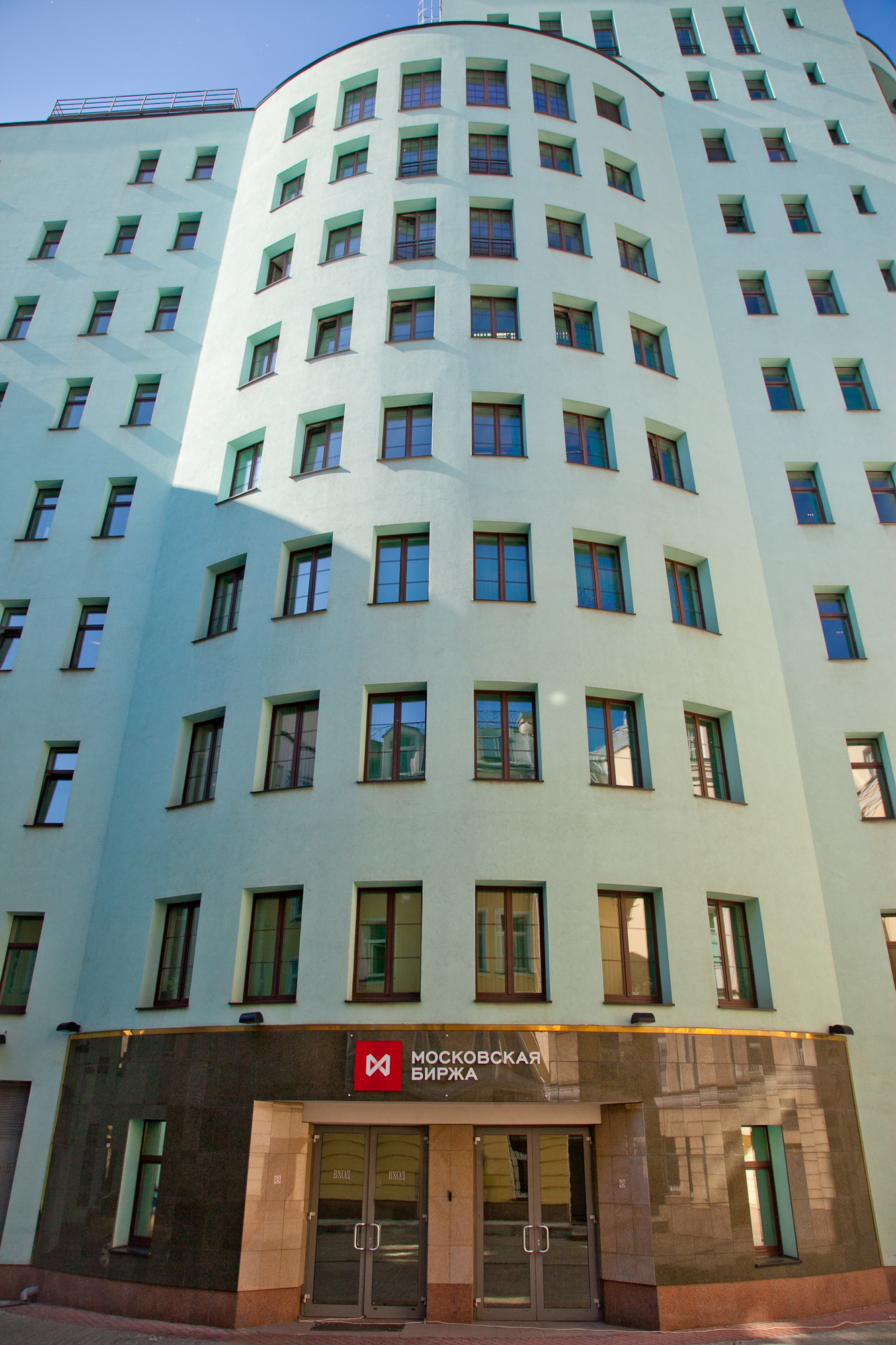
Moscow Exchange

The average gross monthly wage in Moscow is ₽123,688 ($2,000); this wage is around twice the national average of ₽66,572 ($1,000), and it is one of the highest among the federal subjects (constituent entities) of Russia.

Moscow is home to the third-highest number of billionaires among cities internationally, and the highest number among cities in Europe. Moscow is Russia's financial center, as well as headquarters for the country's largest banks and many of its largest companies (e.g., energy company Rosneft). Moscow accounts for 17% of Russia's retail sales and 13% of its construction activity. Since the 1998 Russian financial crisis, business sectors in Moscow have shown strong growth. Many business centers and office buildings have been constructed in recent years, but Moscow still has a shortage of office space. As a result, many former industrial and research facilities are being rebuilt for office use. Economic stability has improved overall in recent years; nonetheless, crime and corruption hinder business development.

=== Industry ===
Primary industries in Moscow include chemicals, metallurgy, food, textiles, furniture, energy production, software development, and machinery.

A number of industrial organizations are located in Moscow and its surroundings. The Mil Moscow Helicopter Plant manufactures military and civil helicopters. Khrunichev State Research and Production Space Center produces space equipment, including modules for the space stations Mir, Salyut, and the International Space Station (ISS); the center also produces Proton launch vehicles and military intercontinental ballistic missiles (ICBMs). In addition, the Sukhoi, Ilyushin, Mikoyan, Tupolev, and Yakovlev bureaus design aircraft. Khimki—an independent city in Moscow Oblast that has largely been enclosed by Moscow—contains NPO Energomash, which produces rocket engines for Russian and American space programs, as well as the Lavochkin design bureau, which built fighter planes during World War II but has switched to space probes since the Space Race. Automobile plants ZiL and AZLK, as well as the Voitovich Rail Vehicle plant, are located in Moscow; the Metrovagonmash metro wagon plant is located just outside city limits. The Poljot Moscow watch factory produces military, professional, and sport watches that are known domestically and internationally.

The Electrozavod factory was Russia's first transformer factory. The Kristall distillery is the oldest in Russia making vodka products, including Stolichnaya; wines are produced at Moscow plants, including the Moscow Interrepublican Winery. The Moscow Jewelry Factory and the Jewellerprom produce jewelry.

Other industries are located just outside Moscow, and some microelectronic industries are located in Zelenograd, including the company Ruselectronics.

Gazprom, the world's largest extractor of natural gas and the largest Russian company, is headquartered in Moscow, along with other oil, gas, and electricity companies.

Moscow contains the headquarters of many telecommunications and technology companies, including 1C, ABBYY, Beeline, Kaspersky Lab, Mail.Ru Group, MegaFon, MTS, Rambler&Co, Rostelecom, Yandex, and Yota.

Some industry is being transferred out of Moscow to improve the city's ecological condition.

=== Cost of living ===
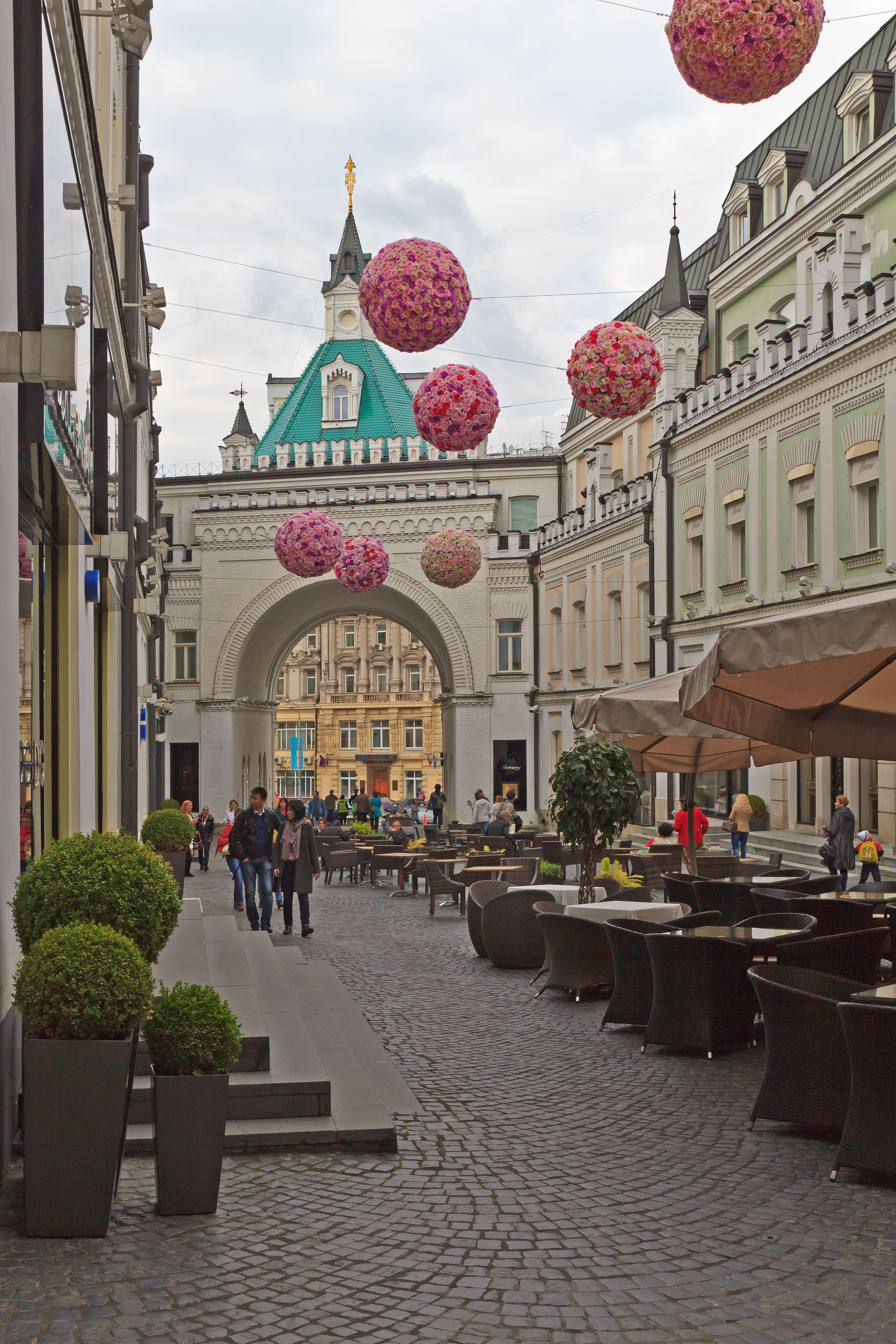
Tretyakovsky Proyezd

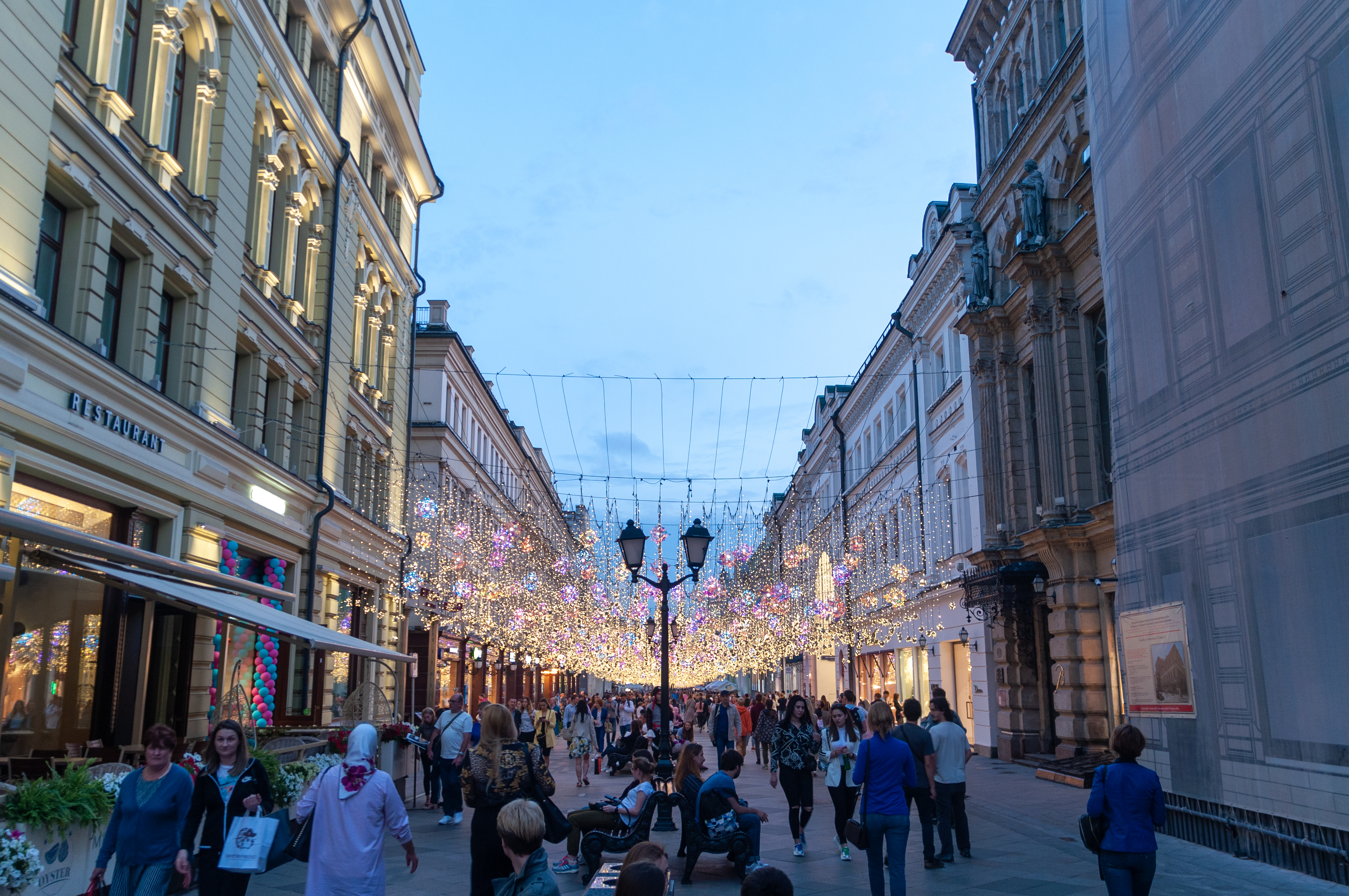
Nikolskaya Street

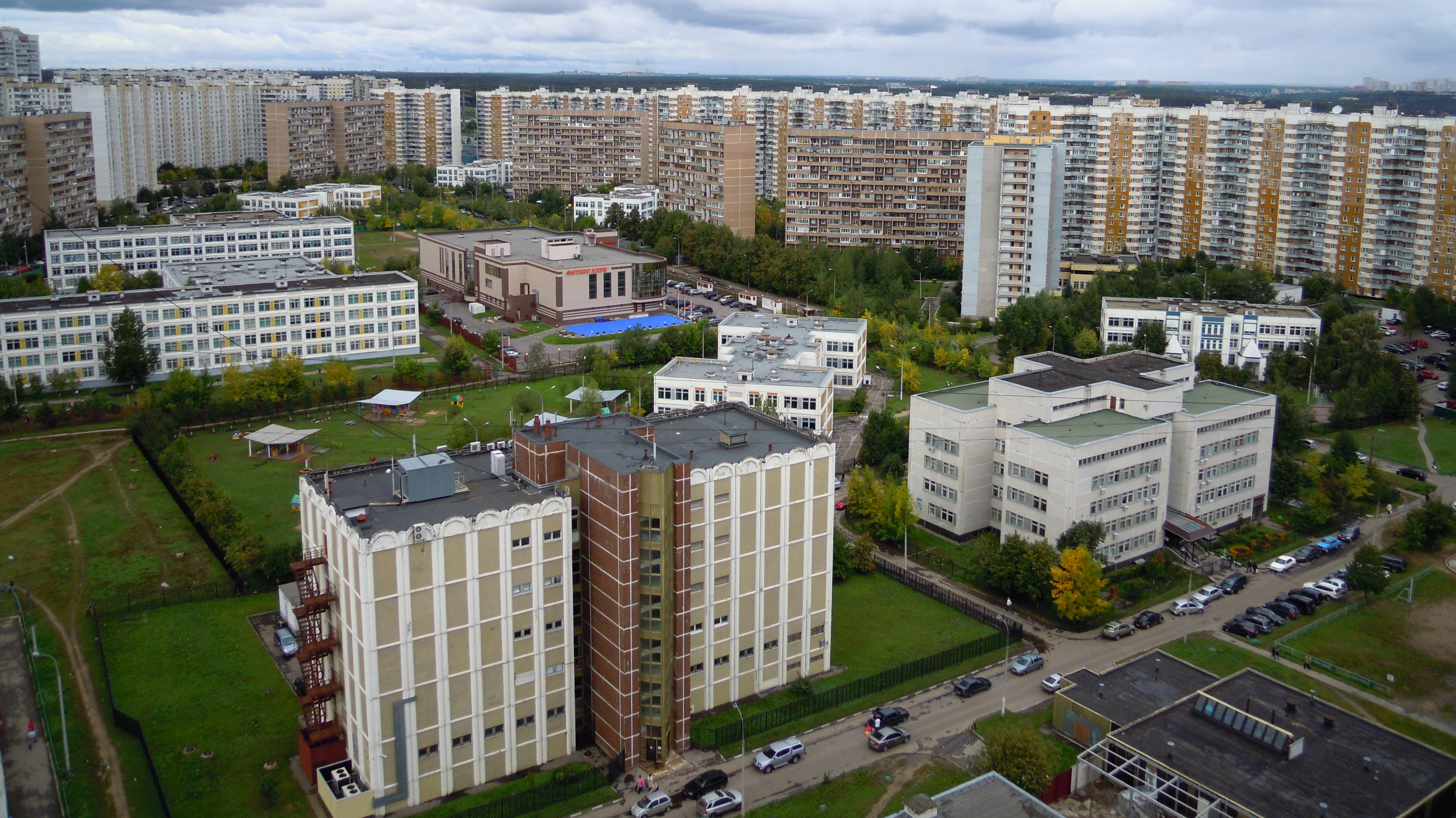
A microdistrict in Mitino built during the 1990s

During the Soviet period, apartments were lent to residents by the government according to a norm of square meters per person. Certain groups—including People's Artists, heroes, and prominent scientists—received bonuses proportional to their honors. Private ownership of apartments was limited until the 1990s, when residents were permitted to acquire rights to their inhabited properties. Since the Soviet era, apartment owners have needed to pay a service charge for their residences, a fixed amount based on residents per living area.

The price of real estate in Moscow continues to increase. The expected price averages $4,000 per square meter (11 sq ft) near the perimeter of the city or $6,500–8,000 per square meter in a prestigious district. The price sometimes exceeds $40,000 per square meter for a flat. Renting costs about $1,200 per month for a one-bedroom apartment and about $1,000 per month for a studio in the city center.

A typical one-bedroom apartment in Moscow is about 30 square meters (320 square feet) in area; a typical two-bedroom apartment is 45 square meters (480 square feet); and a typical three-bedroom apartment is 70 square meters (750 square feet). Many residents cannot move out of their apartments, especially if a family lives in a two-room apartment originally granted by the state during the Soviet era. Some city residents have attempted to cope with the cost of living by renting out their apartments while staying in dachas (country houses) outside the city.

In 2006, Mercer Human Resources Consulting named Moscow the world's most expensive city for expatriate employees, ahead of recurring winner Tokyo, because of the stable Russian ruble as well as increasing housing prices. Moscow also ranked first in the 2007 edition and 2008 edition of the survey. However, in 2009, Tokyo overtook Moscow, which came in third after Osaka.

In 2014, according to Forbes magazine, Moscow was ranked the world's ninth most expensive city. This magazine ranked Moscow the second most expensive city the previous year.

In 2019, the Economist Intelligence Unit's biannual Worldwide Cost of Living survey ranked Moscow 102nd among the 133 most expensive cities. ECA International's Cost of Living 2019 Survey ranked Moscow 120th among 482 locations globally.

=== Public utilities ===
Buildings in Moscow, as in other Russian cities, are warmed by district heating. Before 2004, state unitary enterprises were responsible for producing and supplying heat to clients by operating the heating stations and distribution system of Mosgorteplo, Mosteploenergo, and Teploremontnaladka; these provided service to the heating substations in the northeastern part of the city. Clients were divided among enterprises according to location. A major reform launched in 2004 consolidated companies under MIPC, which became the municipal heat supplier. Its subsidiaries were new joint-stock companies. The city's main source of heating is Mosenergo's power station, which was reformed in 2005, when about ten subsidiaries were detached. One of the newly independent companies was the District Heating Network Company (MTK) (Russian: Московская теплосетевая компания). In 2007, the Government of Moscow bought controlling stakes in this company.

"Our city" is a geoinformation portal created in 2011 under Moscow's mayor, Sergei Sobyanin, to initiate constructive dialogue between Moscow residents and the city's executive authorities. This portal is being developed by the State Public Institution "New Management Technologies", together with the Moscow Department of Information Technologies. During its 10 years of operation, more than 1.7 million users have registered for the portal; it has become effective for monitoring urban infrastructure.

== Education ==
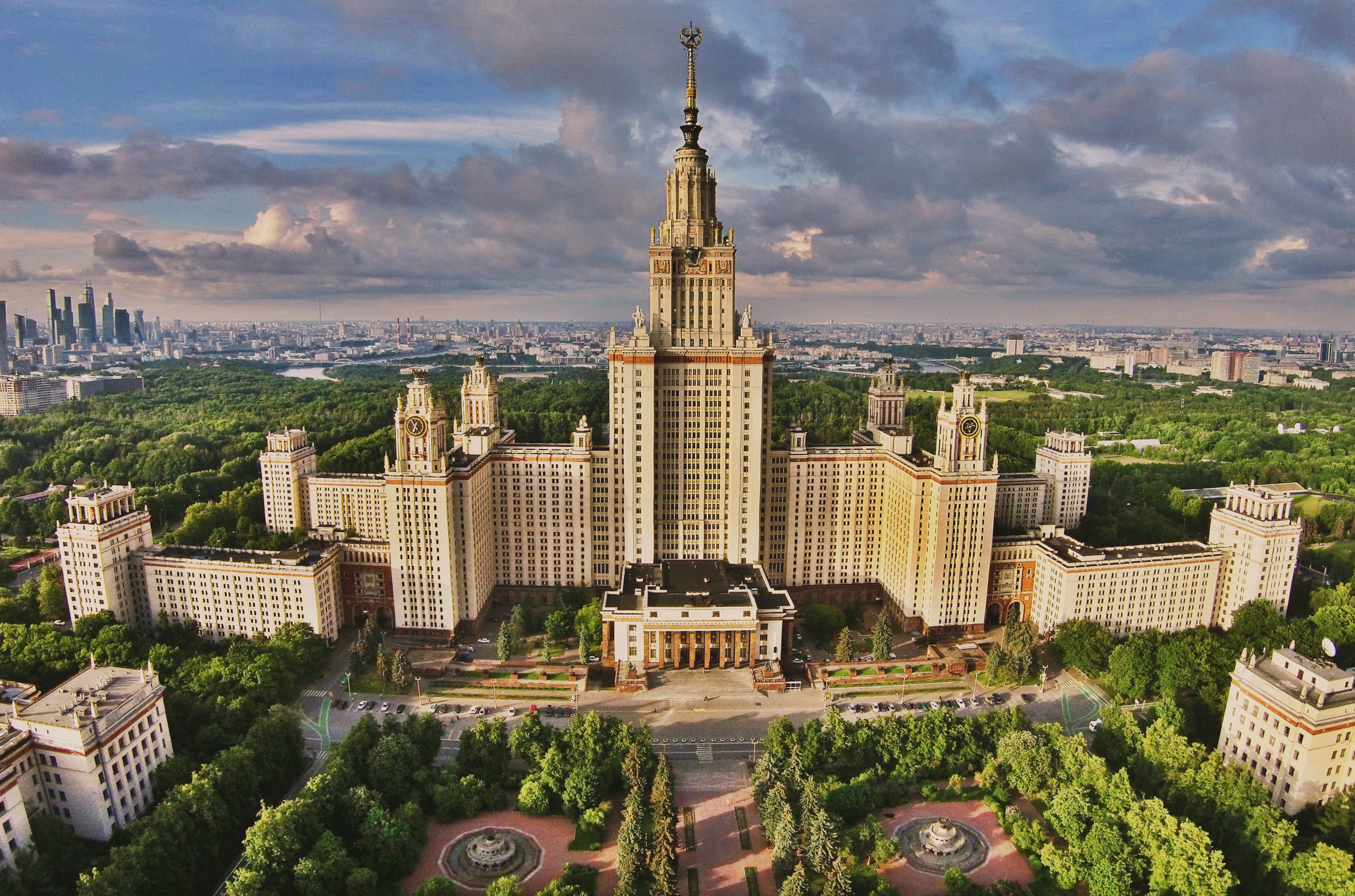
Moscow State University

Moscow contains 1,696 high schools and 91 colleges. In addition, the city has 222 institutions of higher education, including 60 state universities and the Lomonosov Moscow State University (which was founded in 1755). The main university building in Vorobyovy Gory (Sparrow Hills) is 240 meters (790 ft) tall; when completed, it was the tallest building on the continent. The university enrols more than 30,000 undergraduate and 7,000 postgraduate students, who can choose among 29 faculties and 450 departments. The Moscow State University library contains more than nine million books, so it is one of the largest libraries in Russia.

The I.M. Sechenov First Moscow State Medical University, named after Ivan Sechenov, formerly known as Moscow Medical Academy (1stMSMU), is a medical university in Moscow. It was founded in 1785 as the faculty of Moscow State University. It is a Russian Federal Agency for Health and Social Development. Moreover, it is one of the largest medical universities in Russia and Europe. More than 9200 students are enrolled in 115 academic departments; the university also offers courses for postgraduate studies.

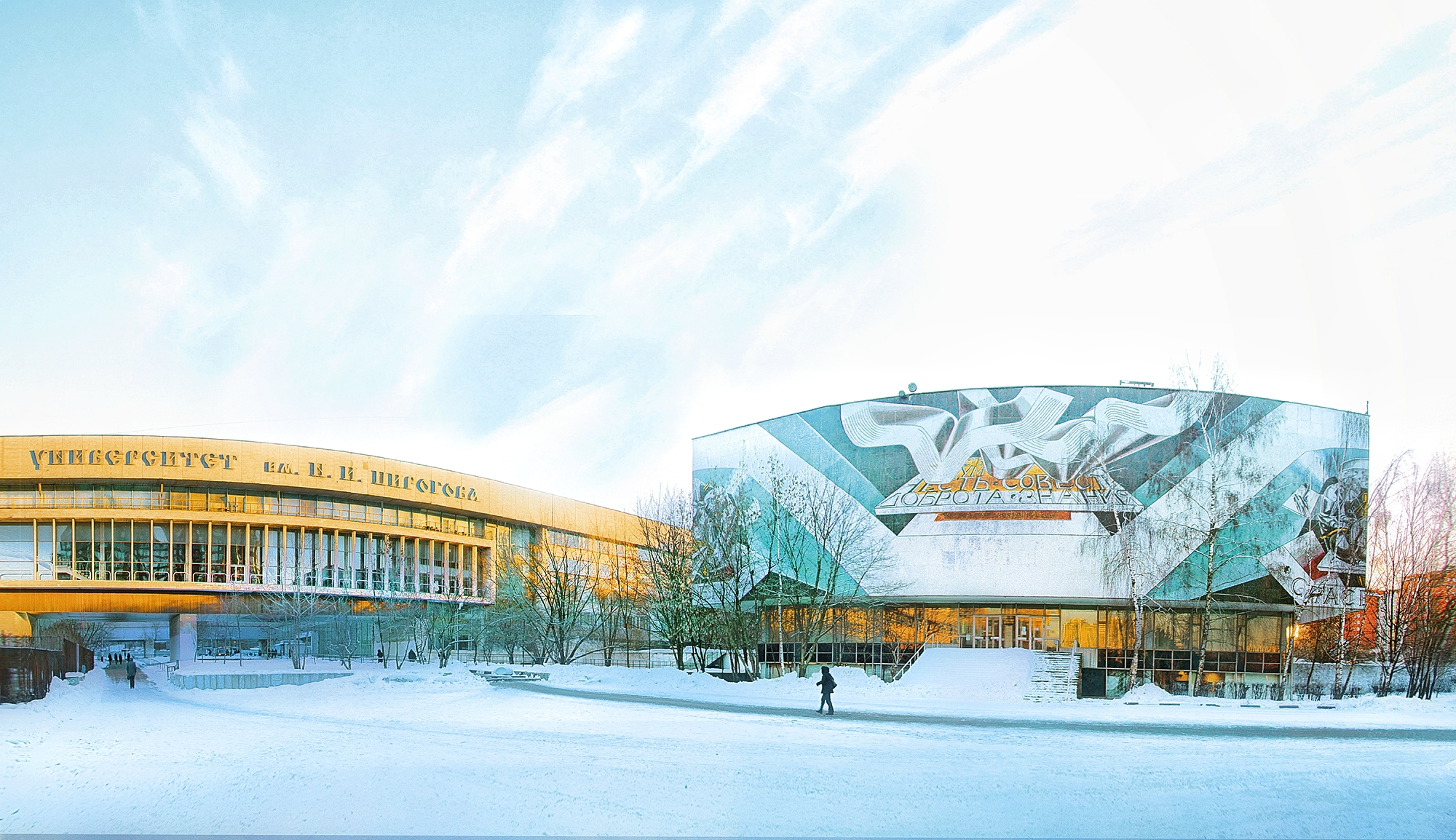
Pirogov Russian National Research Medical University

The Pirogov Russian National Research Medical University (formerly known as the Russian State Medical University) is a medical institution of higher education in Moscow, founded in 1906. This university is fully accredited and recognized by Russia's Ministry of Education and Science, and it is under the authority of the Ministry of Health and Social Development. Named after Russian surgeon and pedagogue N.I. Pirogov (1810–1888), the university is one of the largest medical institutions in Russia, and the first in the country allowing women to complete degrees.

Moscow is one of the financial centers of the Russian Federation and the Commonwealth of Independent States (CIS), and the city is known for business schools. Among these are the Financial University under the Government of the Russian Federation, the Plekhanov Russian University of Economics, the State University of Management, and the National Research University—Higher School of Economics. These schools offer undergraduate degrees in management, finance, accounting, marketing, real estate, and economic theory; in addition, the schools offer master's degrees (including Masters of Business Administration [MBAs]). Most of these schools have branches in other regions of Russia and in other countries.

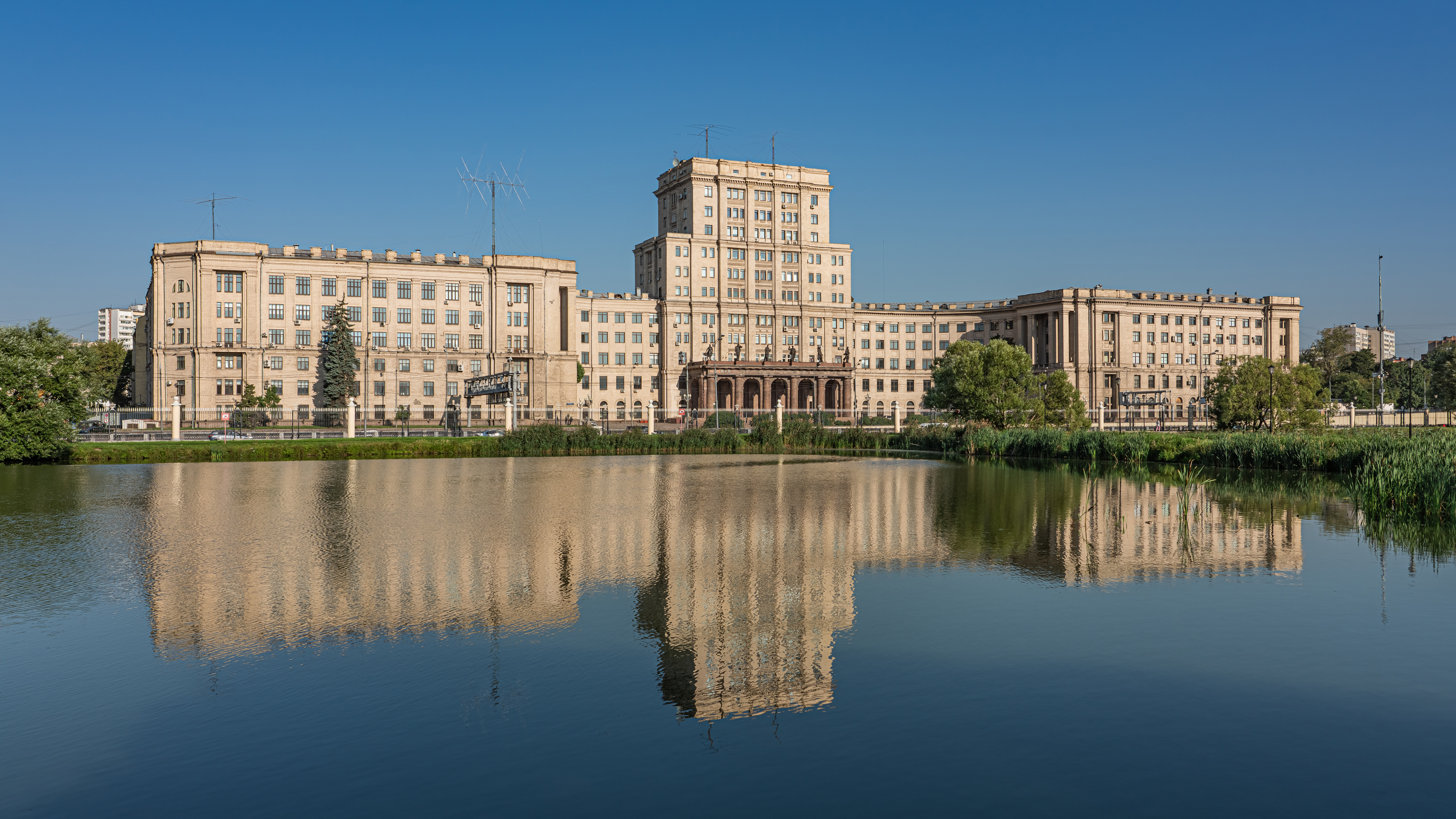
The main building of the Bauman Moscow State Technical University

Bauman Moscow State Technical University, founded in 1830, is located in the city center; the university educates 18,000 undergraduate and 1,000 postgraduate students in science and engineering, offering technical degrees.

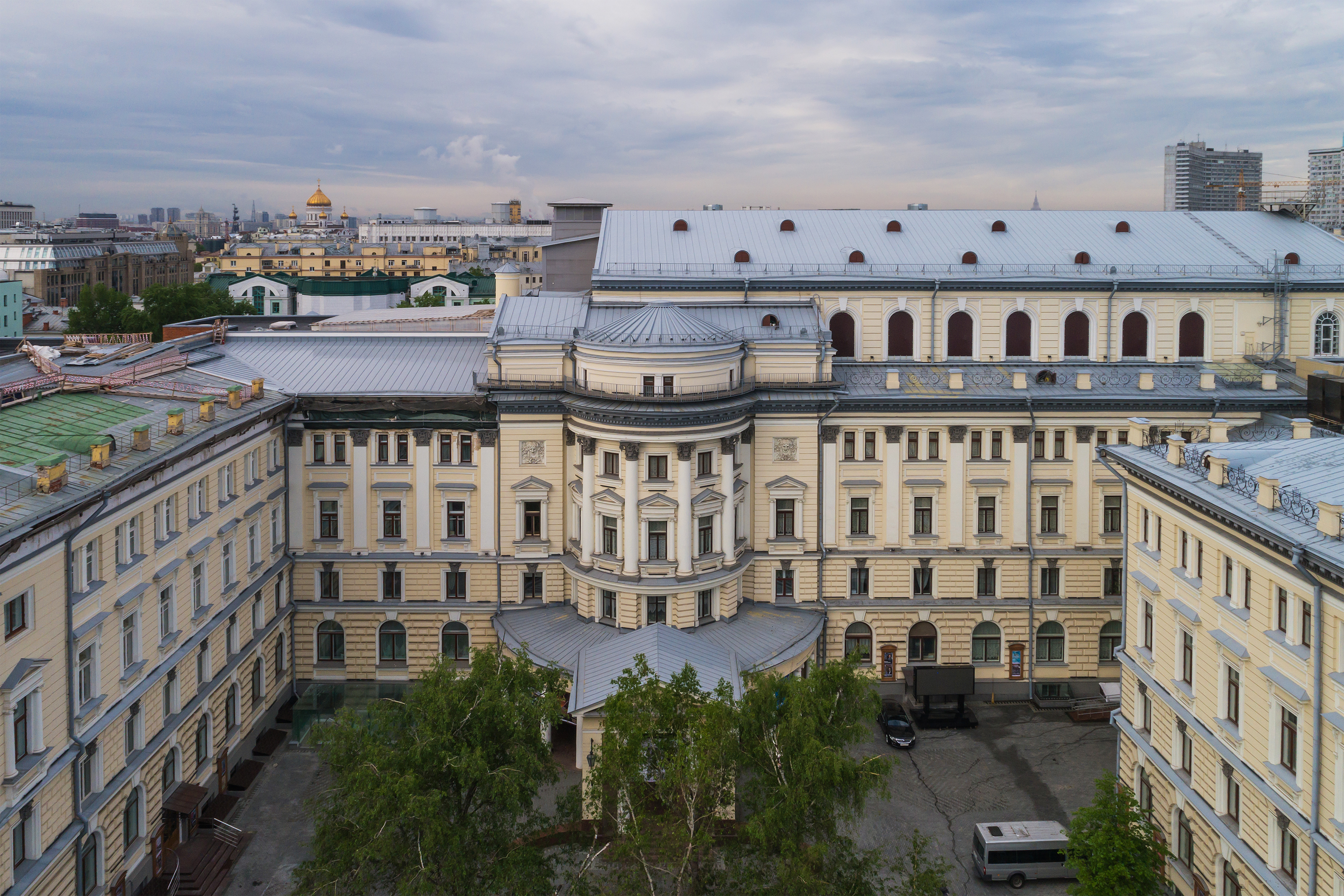
The Moscow Conservatory building

The Moscow Conservatory, founded in 1866, is a prominent music school in Russia.

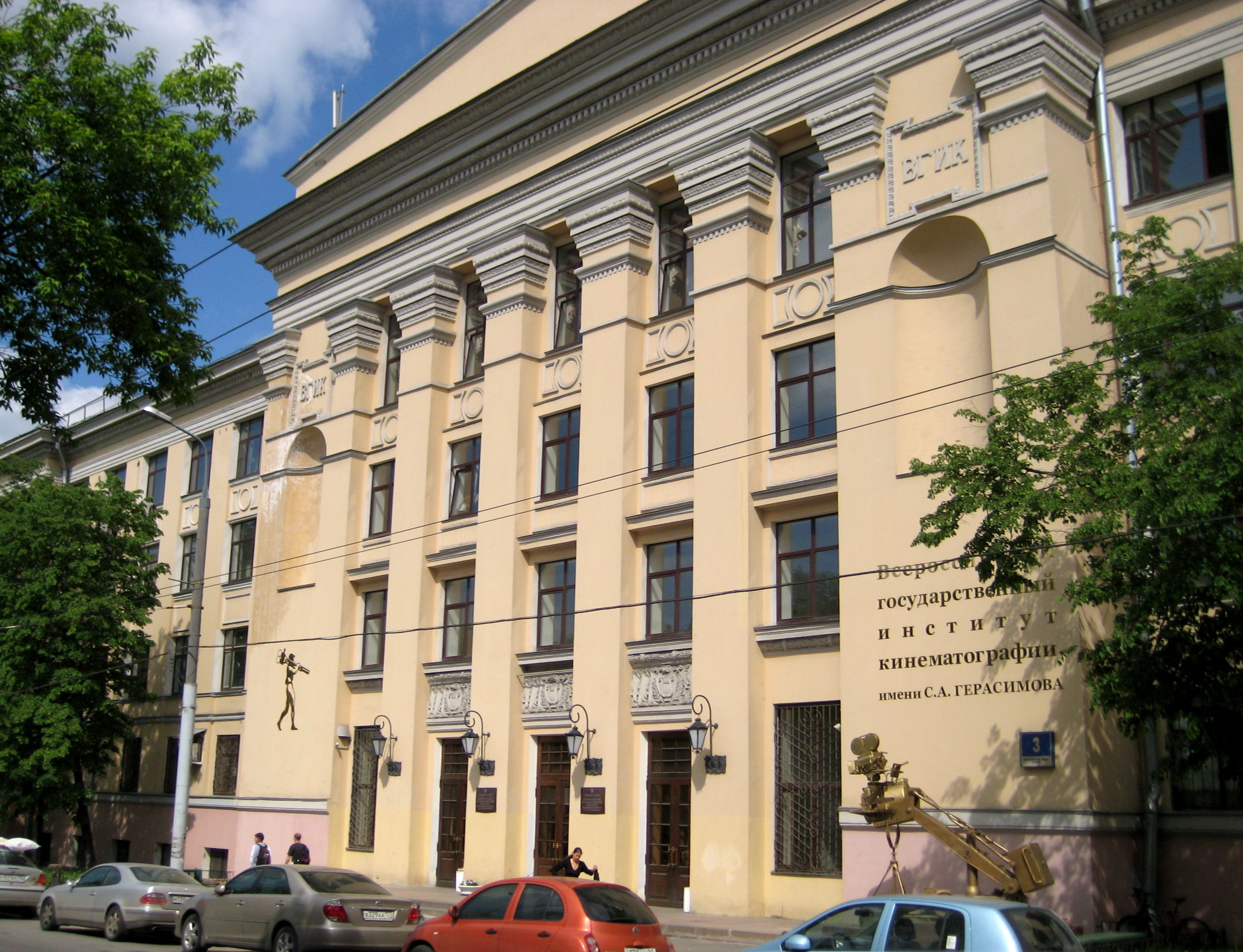
The Russian State Institute of Cinematography, the world's oldest film school

The Gerasimov All-Russian State Institute of Cinematography (VGIK) is the world's oldest educational institution in cinematography, founded by Vladimir Gardin in 1919.

The Moscow State Institute of International Relations, founded in 1944, remains Russia's best-known school of international relations and diplomacy, with six schools focused on international relations. Approximately 4,500 students form the university's student body, and more than 700,000 Russian and foreign-language books (of which 20,000 are considered rare) are contained in the institute's library.

Other Moscow institutions are the following:

- The Moscow Institute of Physics and Technology, also known as Phystech, has taught numerous Nobel Prize winners, including Pyotr Kapitsa, Nikolay Semyonov, Lev Landau, and Alexander Prokhorov
- the Fyodorov Eye Microsurgery Complex, founded in 1988 by Russian eye surgeon Svyatoslav Fyodorov
- the Moscow Aviation Institute
- the Moscow Motorway Institute (State Technical University)
- the Moscow Engineering Physics Institute, known for its research in nuclear physics
- the Combined Arms Academy of the Armed Forces of the Russian Federation, Russia's highest military school

Although Moscow has a number of well-known Soviet-era higher educational institutions—most of which are oriented towards engineering or fundamental sciences—in recent years, the city has a growing number of commercial and private institutions that offer classes in business and management. Many state institutions have expanded their educational scope and introduced new courses or departments. Institutions in Moscow, like the rest of post-Soviet Russia, have begun to offer new international certificates and postgraduate degrees, including the Master of Business Administration. In addition, student exchange programs with many countries—especially in Europe—have become widespread in Moscow's universities. Finally, schools in Moscow offer seminars, lectures, and courses for corporate employees and businessmen.

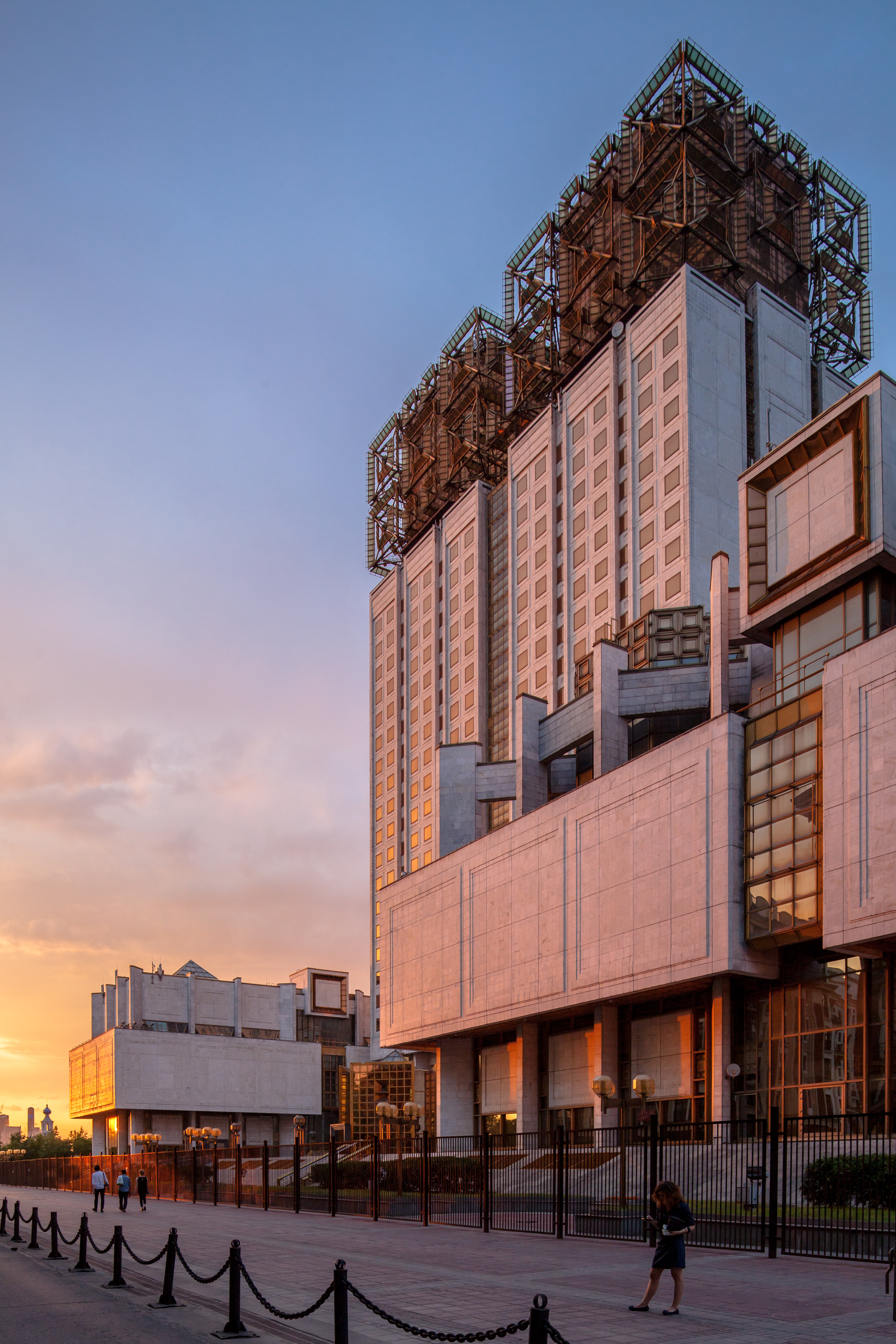
Russian Academy of Sciences

Moscow is one of the largest centers for science in Russia. The headquarters of the Russian Academy of Sciences are located in the city, as well as research and applied science institutions. Moscow also contains the following institutions:

- the Kurchatov Institute, Russia's leading research and development institution in nuclear energy, where the first nuclear reactor in Europe was built
- the Landau Institute for Theoretical Physics
- the Institute for Theoretical and Experimental Physics
- the Kapitza Institute for Physical Problems
- the Steklov Institute of Mathematics

The city contains 452 libraries, including 168 for children. The Russian State Library, founded in 1862, is the national library of Russia. This library contains more than 275 kilometers (171 mi) of shelves and 42 million items—including more than 17 million books and serial volumes, 13 million journals, 350,000 music scores and sound records, and 150,000 maps—making it the country's largest library and one of the world's largest. Items in 247 languages other than Russian account for 29% of the library's collection.

The State Public Historical Library, founded in 1863, is the largest library specialising in Russian history. Its collection contains four million items in 112 languages, mostly on Russian and world history, heraldry, numismatics, and the history of science.

On the subject of primary and secondary education, journalist Clifford J. Levy of The New York Times newspaper wrote in 2011:

Moscow has some strong public schools, but the system as a whole is dispiriting, in part because it is being corroded by the corruption that is a post-Soviet scourge. Parents often pay bribes to get their children admitted to better public schools. There are additional payoffs for good grades.

== Transportation ==
=== Metro ===
Moscow Metro route map with planned stations

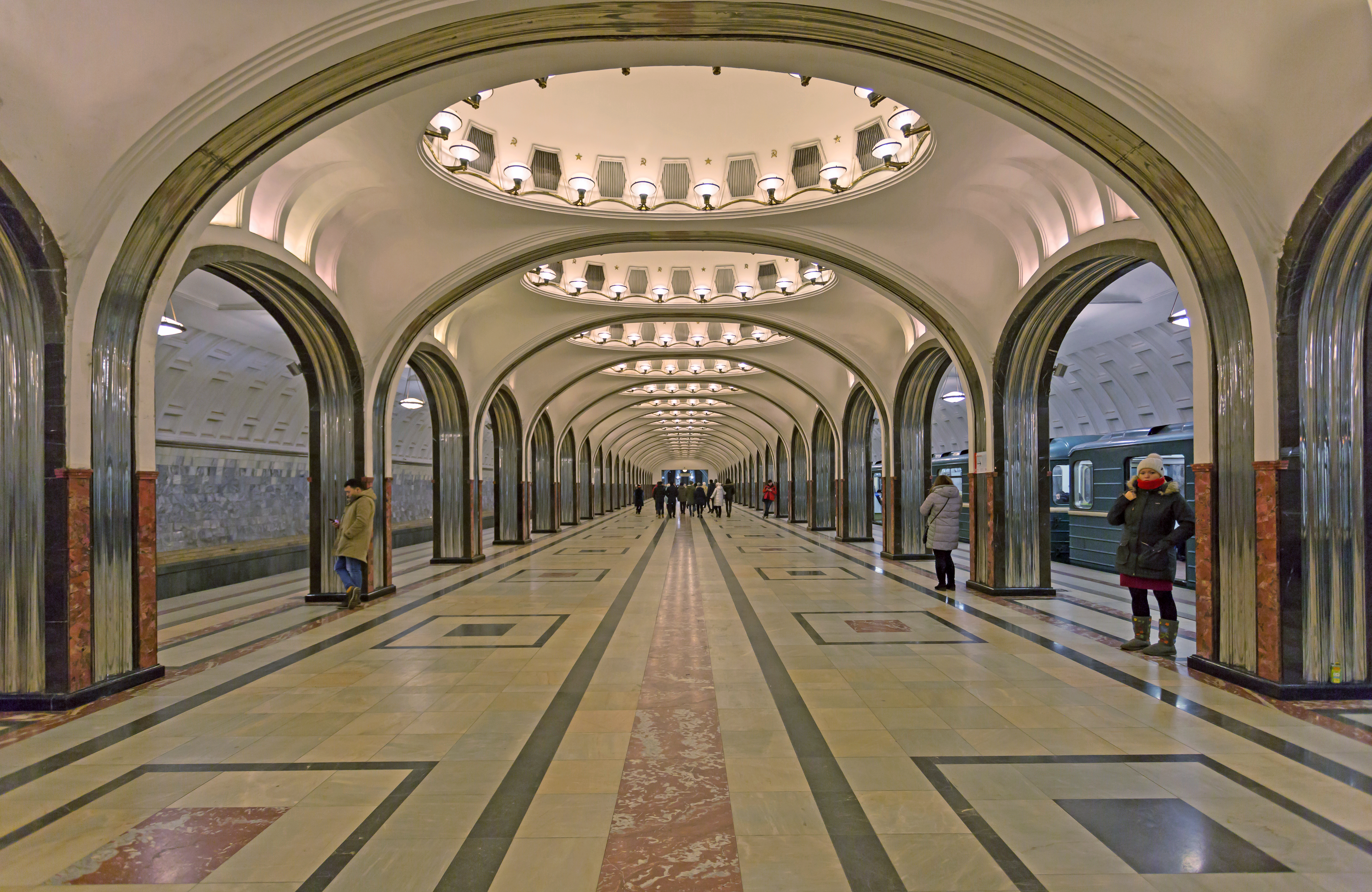
Mayakovskaya station, opened in 1938

The Moscow Metro system is well-known for art, murals, mosaics, and chandeliers. This system started operating in 1935 and promptly became the centerpiece of the city's transportation system. Moreover, the system was a Stalinist tactic to awe and reward the population, as well as help them to appreciate Soviet realist art. The system became the prototype for later large-scale Soviet technologies. Lazar Kaganovich headed the system; he designed the subway so that residents would absorb the values and ethos of Stalinist society as they rode. The artwork of the original 13 stations became nationally and internationally known. For example, the Sverdlov Square subway station featured porcelain bas-reliefs depicting the daily life of Soviet people; in addition, the bas-reliefs at the Dynamo Stadium sports complex glorified sports and the physical prowess of the new "Homo Sovieticus" (Soviet man).

The metro was heralded as the symbol of a new social order—a sort of communist cathedral of engineering modernity. Soviet workers performed the labor and created the art, but the main engineering designs, routes, and construction plans were handled by specialists recruited from the London Underground. The Britons called for tunneling rather than the "cut-and-cover" technique; preferred escalators over lifts; and designed the routes and the rolling stock. The paranoia of Stalin and the NKVD (Soviet secret police) was evident when the NKVD arrested many British engineers for espionage—that is, for gaining an in-depth knowledge of the city's physical layout. Engineers for the Metropolitan Vickers Electrical Company were given a show trial and deported in 1933, ending the role of British business in the USSR.

Today, the Moscow Metro comprises 12 lines, mostly underground, with a total of 203 stations. It is one of the deepest subway systems in the world; for instance, the Park Pobedy station, completed in 2003, 84 meters (276 ft) underground, has the longest escalators in Europe. The Moscow Metro is the busiest such system in Europe, as well as one of the world's busiest, serving about ten million passengers daily (300 million people each month). As of 2016, facing serious transportation problems, Moscow planned to expand its metro. That year, the authorities launched a new circle metro railway that helped to solve transportation problems, namely daily congestion on the Koltsevaya line.

Because metro stations were treated as potential media for art—because workers in Moscow could see such art every day—many Stalin-era metro stations were built using customized designs; each station's design was initially a large installation on a specific theme. For example, the Elektrozavodskaya station was themed on a nearby lightbulb factory and ceramic ribbed lightbulb sockets. The tradition of "Grand Designs"—essentially decorating a metro station as a single-themed installation—was restored in late 1979.

Moscow's metro is one of the world's busiest, handling 2.6 billion passengers in 2019.

Moscow contains more than 21,500 Wi-Fi access points in student dormitories; in parks; at cultural and sports institutions; and within the Garden Ring and the Third Transport Ring. From September 2020 to August 2021, 1,700 public Wi-Fi access points were launched in Moscow. The structure of the city's Wi-Fi network allows residents to use the Internet without reauthorization.

=== Monorail ===
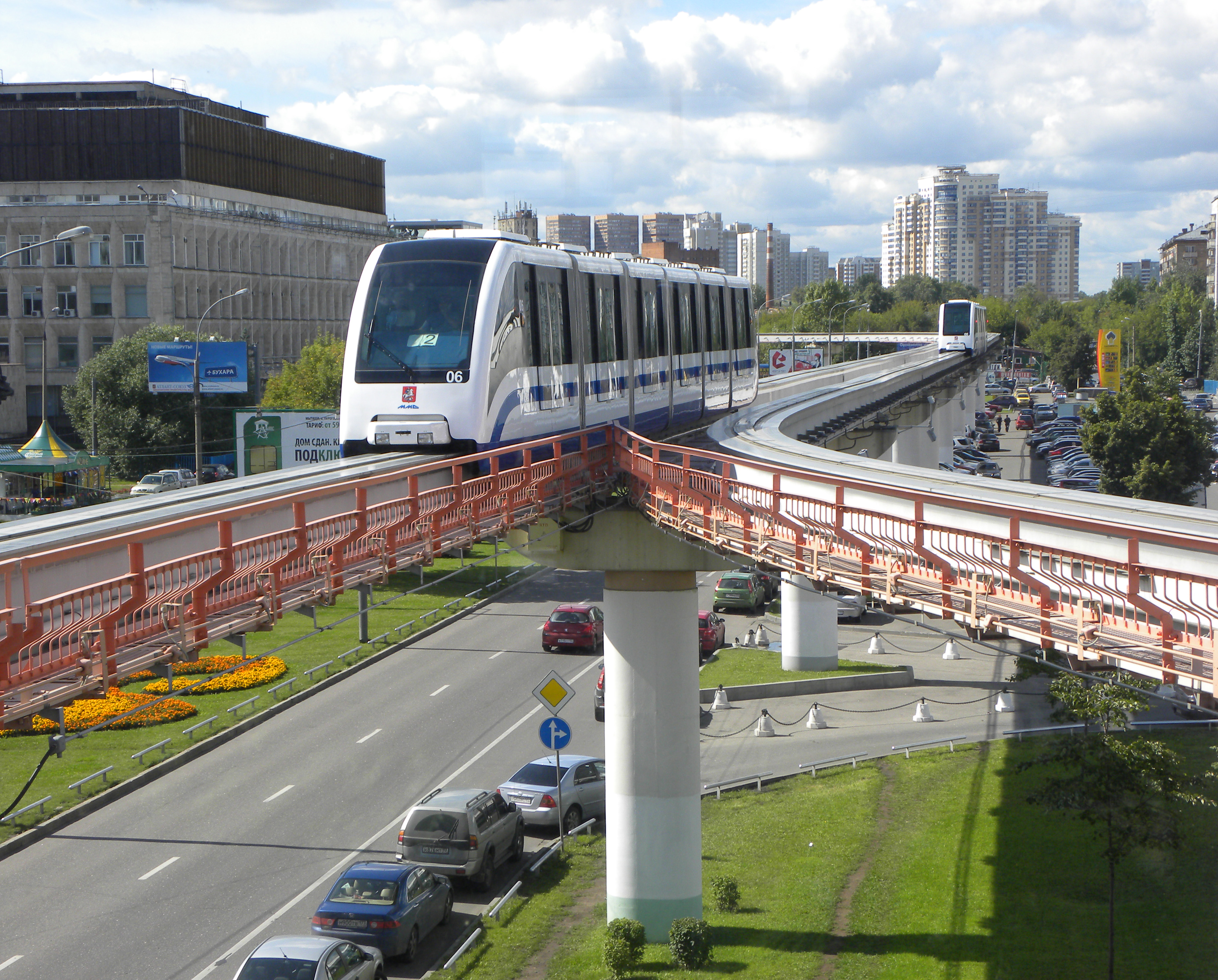
Two trains of the Moscow Monorail

The Moscow Metro operates a short monorail line (line 13). This line connects the Timiryazevskaya metro station and Ulitsa Sergeya Eisensteina (street), passing near the Exhibition of Achievements of National Economy (VDNKh) (and the Line 6 Metro station VDNKh). The monorail line opened in 2004. It permits above-ground transfers; a passenger does not need to pay any additional fare if they took another ride on the Moscow Metro within the most recent 90 minutes.

=== Bus, trolleybus, and electric bus ===
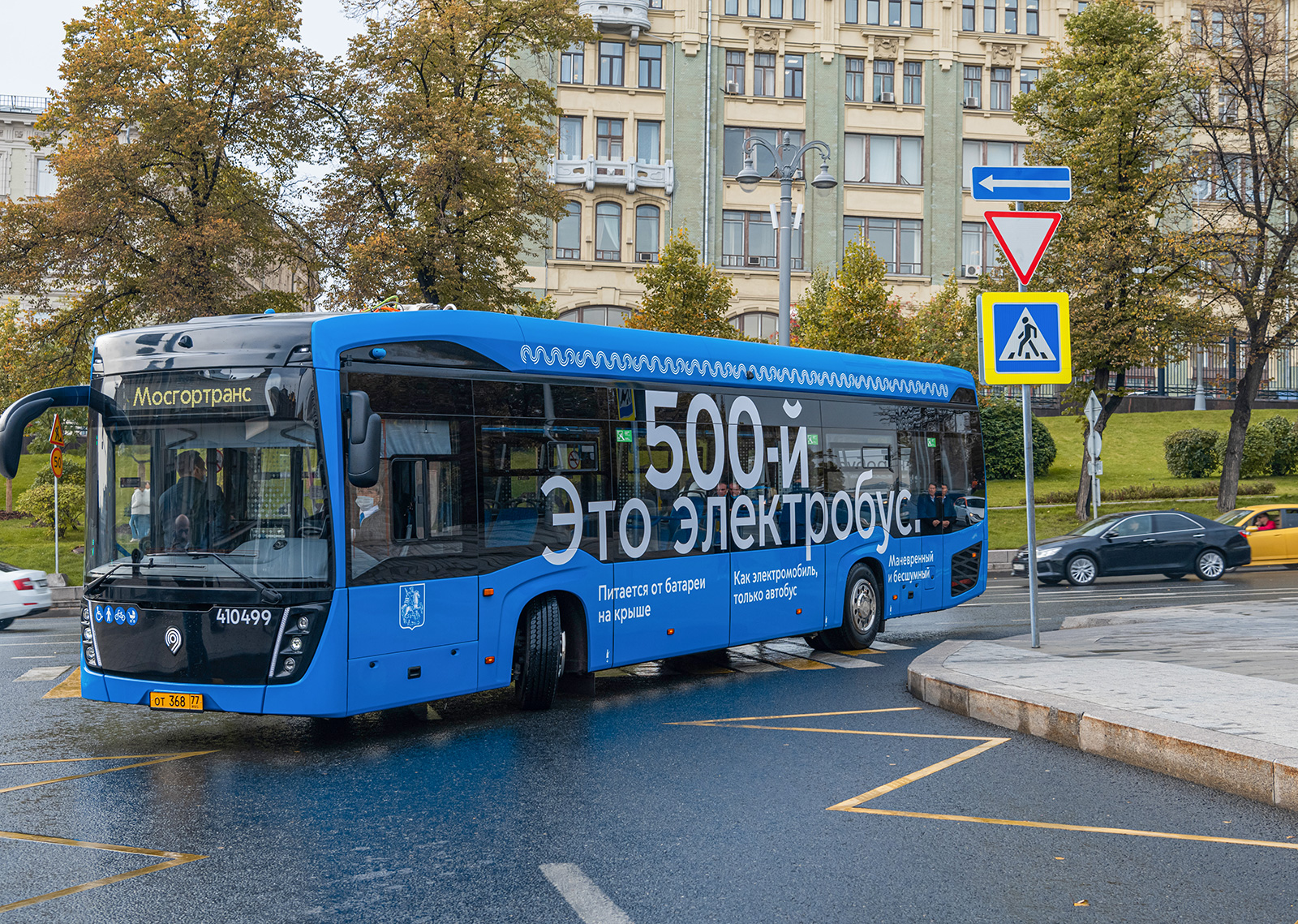
Moscow has the largest fleet of electric buses in Europe, with 500 operating as of October 2020.

Because metro stations outside Moscow's city center are spaced relatively far apart from each other—up to 4 kilometers (2.5 mi)—compared to other cities, a radial bus network connects each station to the surrounding residential zones. Moscow has a bus terminal (the Central Bus Terminal) for long-range and intercity passenger buses, handling about 25 thousand passengers each day and serving about 40% of long-range bus routes in Moscow.

Every major street in Moscow is served by at least one bus route. Many of these routes share a trolleybus route and have overhead trolley wires.

The Moscow trolleybus system has a total line length of almost 600 kilometers (370 mi) of single wires, 8 depots, 104 routes, and 1740 vehicles; this system was the world's largest. However, the municipal authority, headed by Sergey Sobyanin, began to phase out the trolleybus system in 2014 because of its planned replacement with electric buses. In 2018, the trolleybus system retained only 4 depots and dozens of kilometers of unused overhead wires. Almost all wires inside the Garden Ring (Sadovoe Koltso) were cut in 2016–2017 because the central streets were rebuilt (the "Moya Ulitsa" project). Opened on 15 November 1933, Moscow's trolleybus system is the world's sixth-oldest such system in operation.

In 2018, the vehicle companies Kamaz and GAZ won the Mosgortrans contract to deliver 200 electric buses and 62 ultrafast charging stations for the city's transport system. The manufacturers are responsible for the quality and reliable operation of buses and charging stations for 15 years. The city was procuring only electric buses as of 2021, gradually replacing the diesel bus fleet. Moscow was expected to become the leading European city in its share of electric versus gas fuel in public transit by 2019.

=== Moscow cable car ===
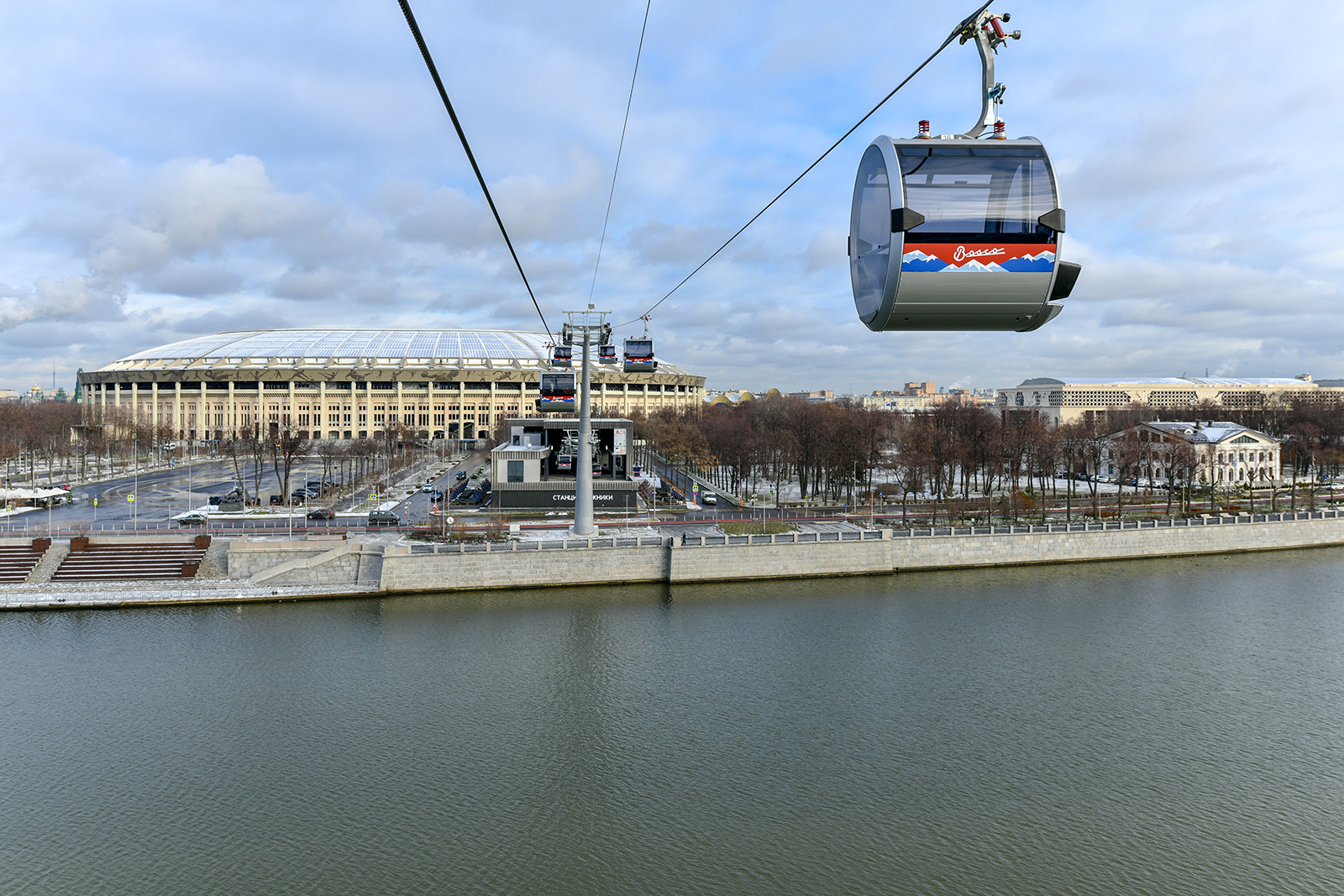
Cable cars passing over the Moskva River and the Luzhniki Stadium

On 26 November 2018, the mayor of Moscow, Sergey Sobyanin, participated in the ceremony to launch the cable car above the Moskva River. This car connects the Luzhniki sports complex with Sparrow Hills and Kosygin Street. The trip from the viewpoint on Vorobyovy Gory to Luzhniki Stadium takes only five minutes, rather than 20 minutes by car.

=== Tram ===
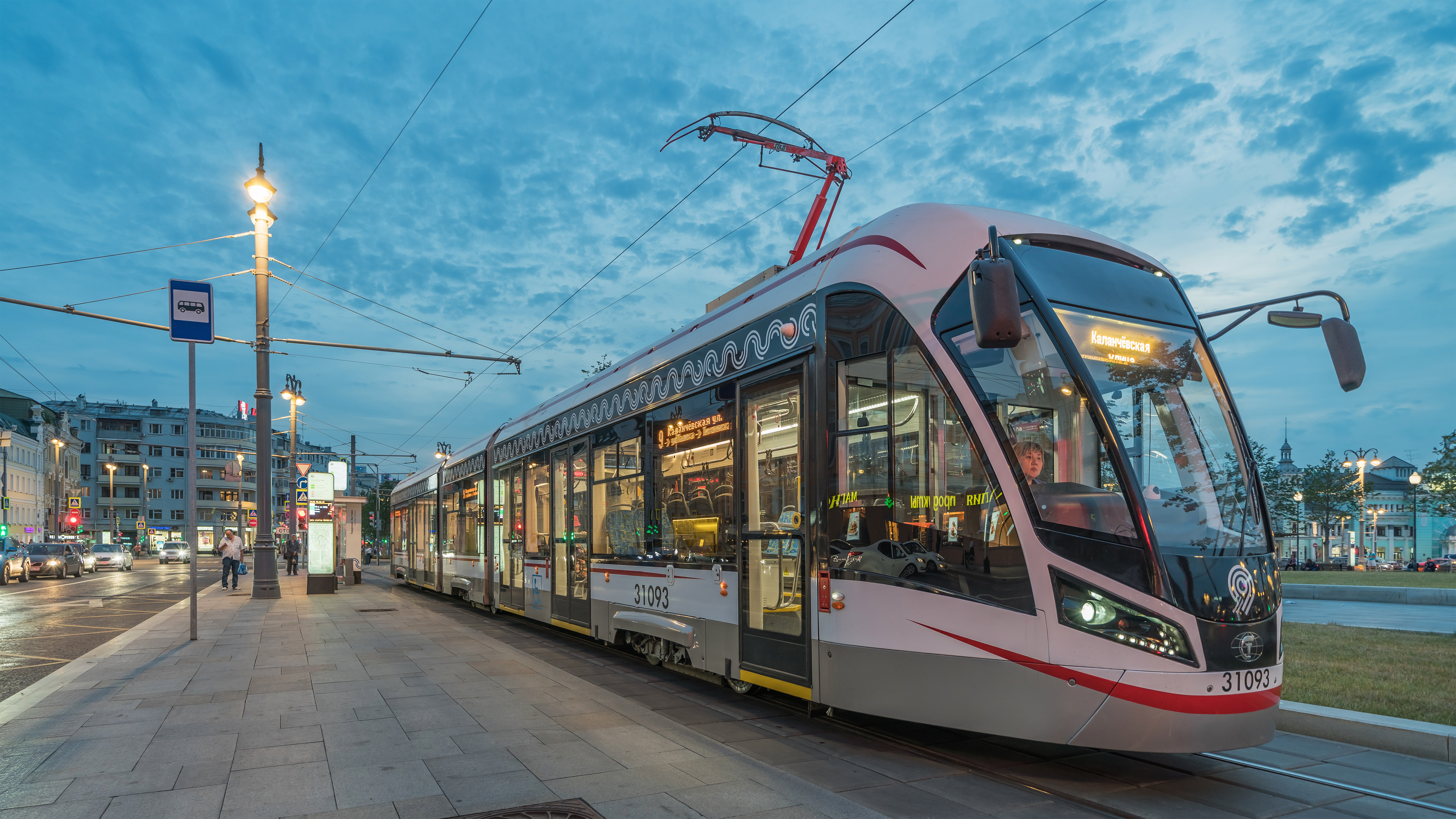
A Vityaz-M tram passing by the Tverskaya Zastava Square

Moscow has an extensive tram system, which opened in 1899. The newest line was constructed in 1984. Daily tram usage by Muscovites is low, making up approximately 5% of trips, because vital connections in the network have been phased out. Nevertheless, trams remain important in some districts as feeders to metro stations. Trams also provide important cross-links between metro lines—for example, between the Universitet station on the Sokolnicheskaya Line (#1 red line) and the Profsoyuznaya station on the Kaluzhsko-Rizhskaya Line (#6 orange line), and similarly between the Voykovskaya metro station and the Strogino metro station.

Tram map of Moscow

There are three tram networks in the city:

- The Krasnopresnenskoye depot network, with its westernmost point at Strogino (depot location) and its easternmost point near platform Dmitrovskaya. This network was divided in 1973; however, until 1997 it could have been easily reconnected using about 1 kilometer (50 chains) of track and three switches. The network has the highest usage in Moscow and no weak points based on traffic, except the to-depot lane (passengers serviced by bus) and the tram ring at Dmitrovskaya (because this is neither a normal transfer point nor a repair terminal).
- The Apakov depot services the southwestern portion, from Varshavsky Lane–Simferopolsky Boulevard in the east, to Universitet station in the west and Boulevard Lane at the center. This network is connected only by the four-way Dubininskaya and Kozhevnicheskaya Streets. A second connection by Vostochnaya (Eastern) Street was phased out in 1987 because of a fire at the Dinamo plant; this connection has not been recovered, and it remains lost (Avtozavodsky Bridge) as of 1992. In any case, the network may be serviced by another depot (routes 35 and 38).
- The main three depot networks with railway gate and tram-repair plant.

In addition, tram advocates have suggested that the new rapid transit services (metro to the city, Butovo light metro, monorail) would be more effective as at-grade tram lines and that the problems with trams are only due to poor management and operation, not the technical properties of trams. New tram models have been developed for the Moscow network despite the lack of expansion.

=== Taxi ===
Commercial taxi services and route taxis are widely used in Moscow. During the mid-2010s, service platforms such as Yandex Taxi, Uber, and Gett displaced many private drivers and small service providers; in 2015, these platforms serviced more than 50% of all taxi orders in the city.

As of 2021, Russian technology company Yandex was testing self-driving taxis in Moscow.

=== Railway ===
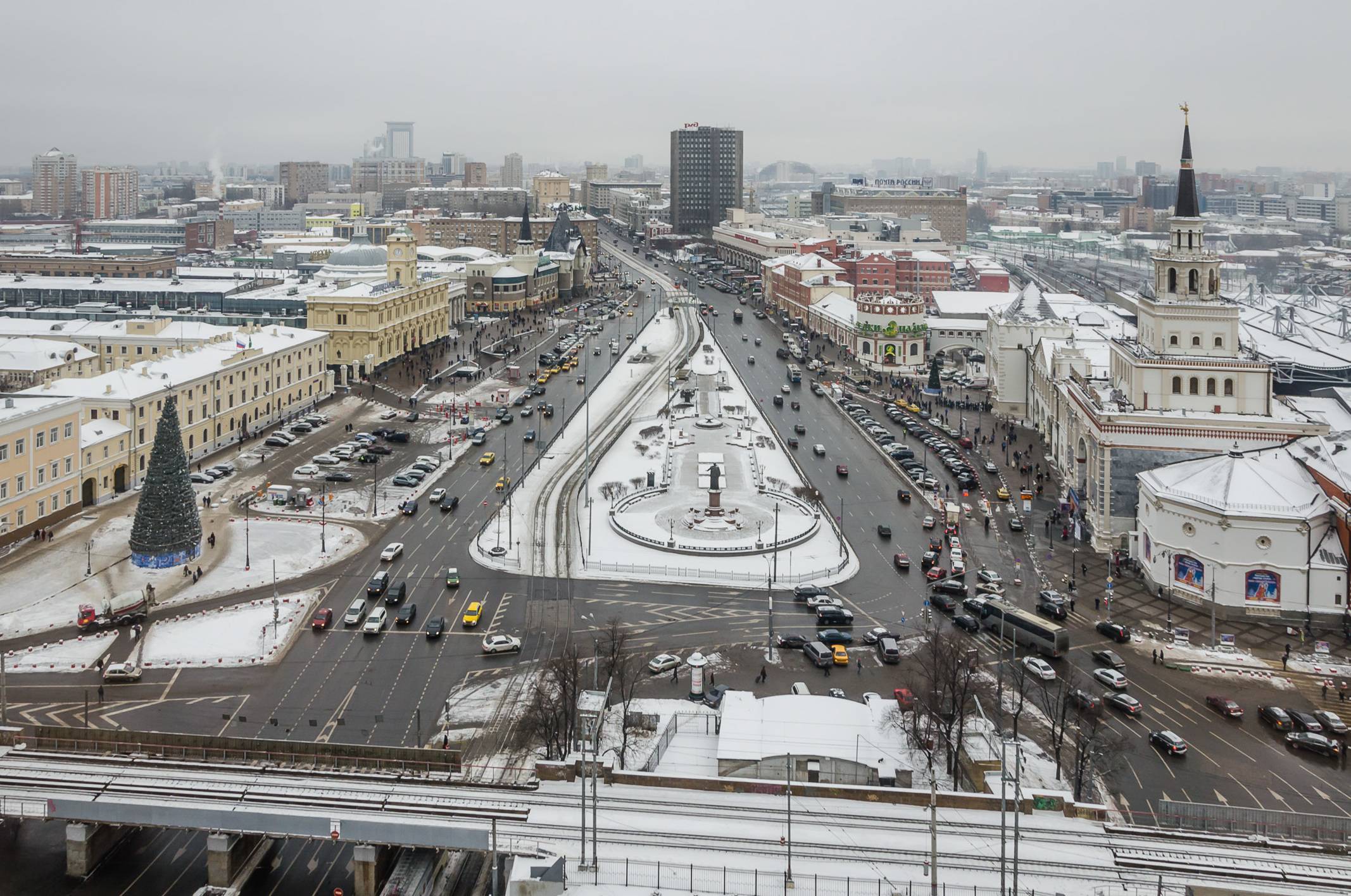
Komsomolskaya Square is known as "Three Station Square" because of its three ornate rail terminals: Leningradsky, Yaroslavsky, and Kazansky.

Several train stations serve Moscow. The city's ten rail terminals (or vokzals) are the following:

- Belorussky
- Kazansky
- Kiyevsky
- Kursky
- Leningradsky
- Paveletsky
- Rizhsky
- Savyolovsky
- Yaroslavsky
- Vostochny

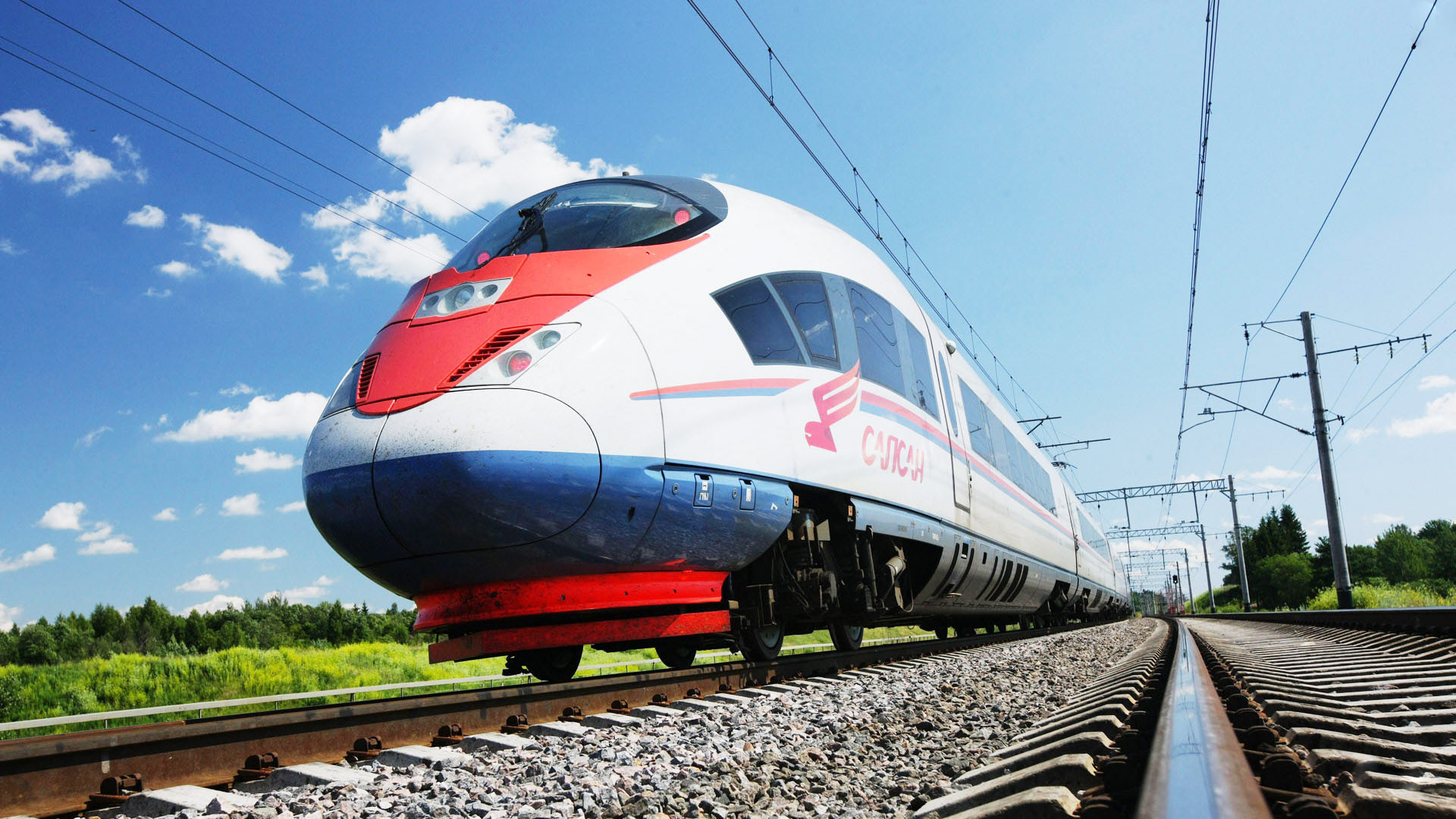
The high-speed Sapsan train links Moscow with Saint Petersburg.

These terminals are near the city center—along the Metro's Line 5 or near it—and connect to it via a metro line. Each station handles trains from different parts of Europe and Asia. Moscow contains many smaller railway stations. Because tickets are inexpensive, trains are Russians' preferred mode of travel, especially when traveling to Saint Petersburg. Moscow is the western terminus of the Trans-Siberian Railway, which crosses nearly 9,300 kilometers (5,800 mi) of Russian territory to reach Vladivostok on the Pacific coast.

Suburbs and satellite cities are connected by a commuter elektrichka (electric rail) network. Elektrichkas depart from each of these terminals to the nearby large railway stations (up to 140 kilometers or 87 miles away).

During the 2010s, the Little Ring of the Moscow Railway was converted for frequent passenger service. This ring is fully integrated with the Moscow Metro; passenger service started on 10 September 2016. A connecting railway line on the city's north side connects the Belorussky terminal with other railway lines. This line is used by some suburban trains.

==== Moscow Central Circle ====
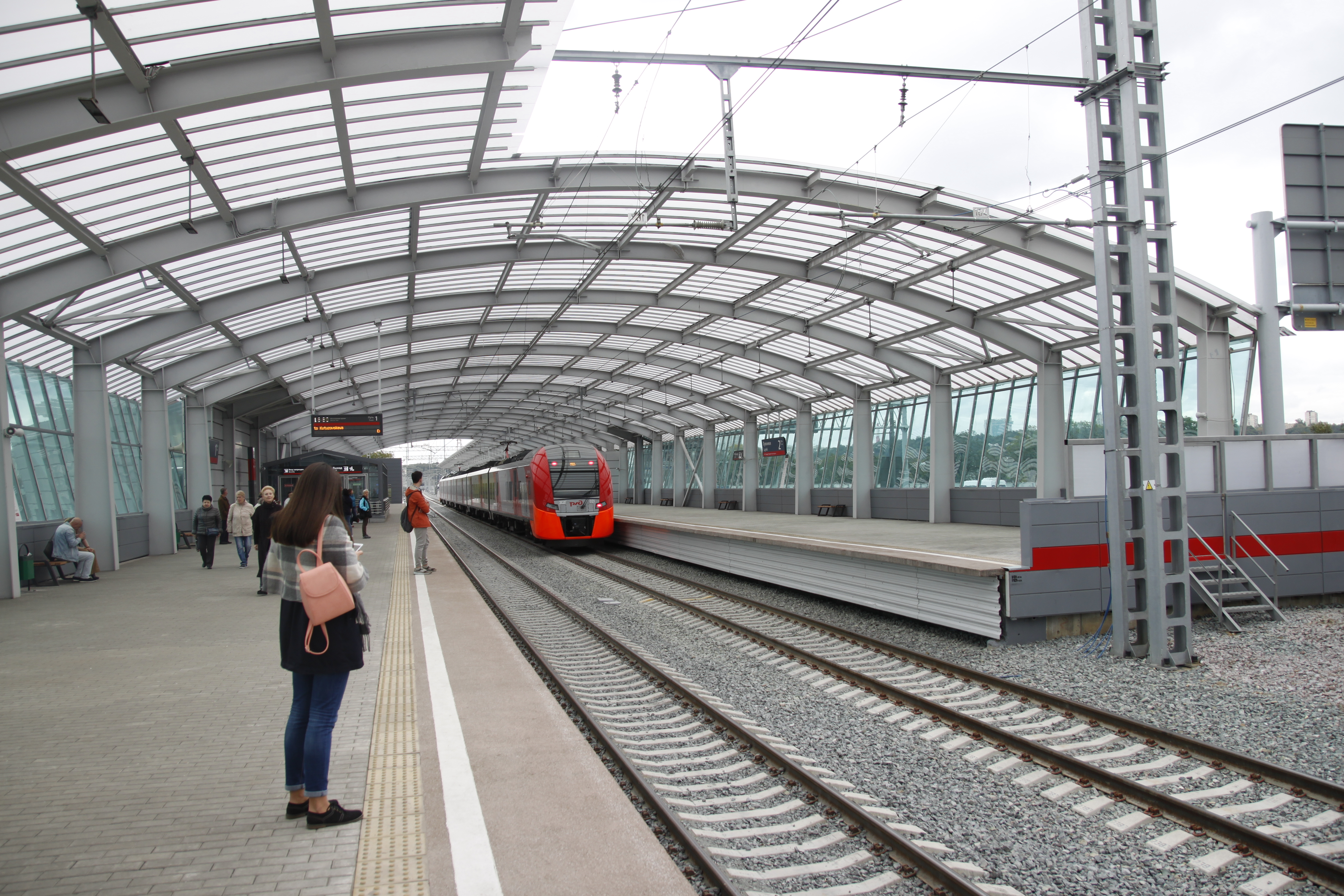
"Lastochka" train at the Luzhniki station (Line 14)

The Moskovskaya Okruzhnaya Zheleznaya Doroga (orbital railway line) has formed a ring around Moscow's current downtown since 1903. However, this line was a non-electrified, locomotive-only railway before reconstruction into the MCC during the 2010s.

The Moscow Central Circle is a 54-kilometer (34 mi) orbital urban rail transit line that encircles historic Moscow. This line was built alongside the Little Ring of the Moscow Railway, incorporating some of its tracks. The MCC was opened for passenger use on 10 September 2016.

The MCC line is operated by the Moscow government-owned company MKZD through the Moscow Metro, with the federal government-owned Russian Railways as the operations subcontractor.

==== Moscow Central Diameters ====
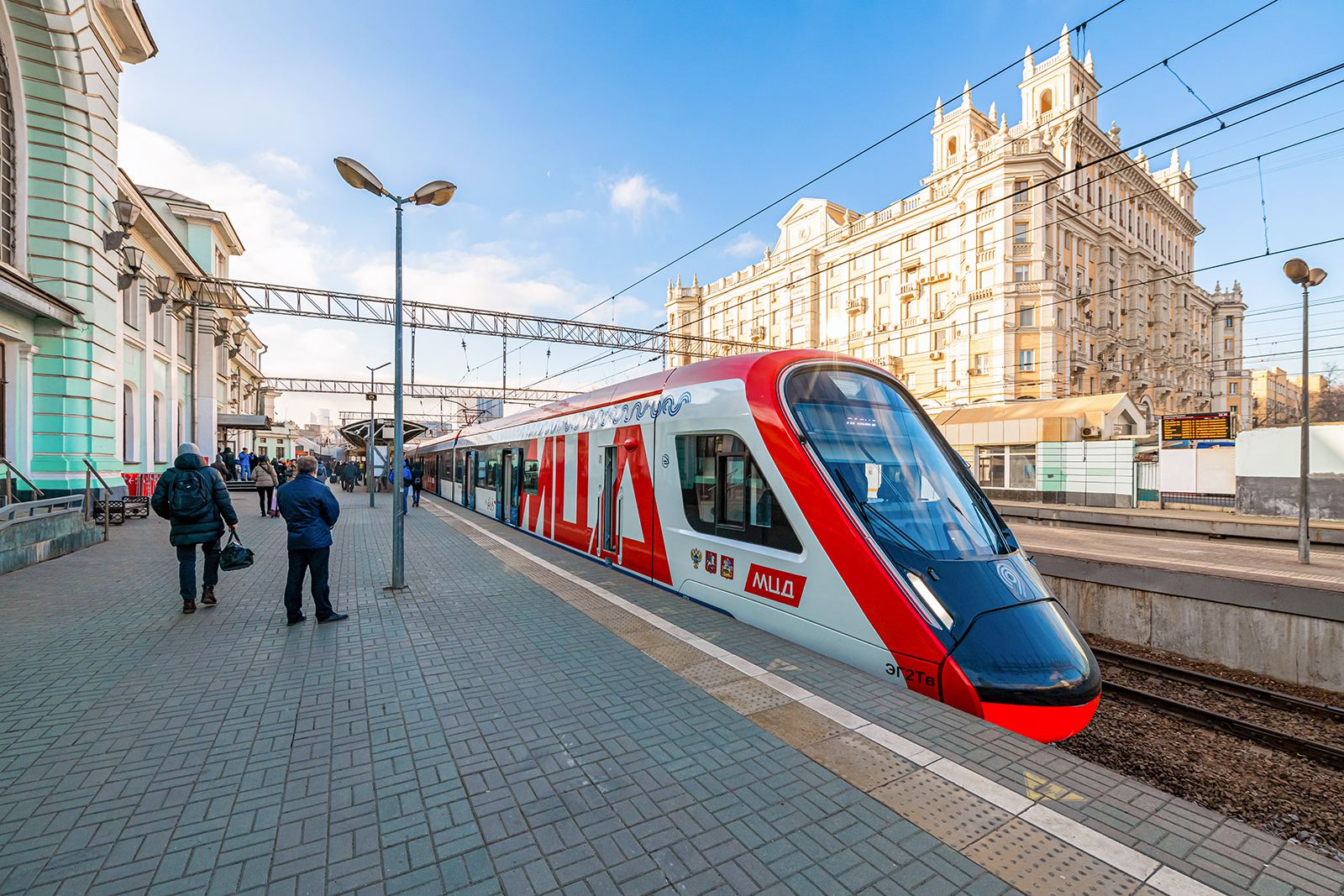
An EG2Tv train arriving at the Moscow Belorussky railway station

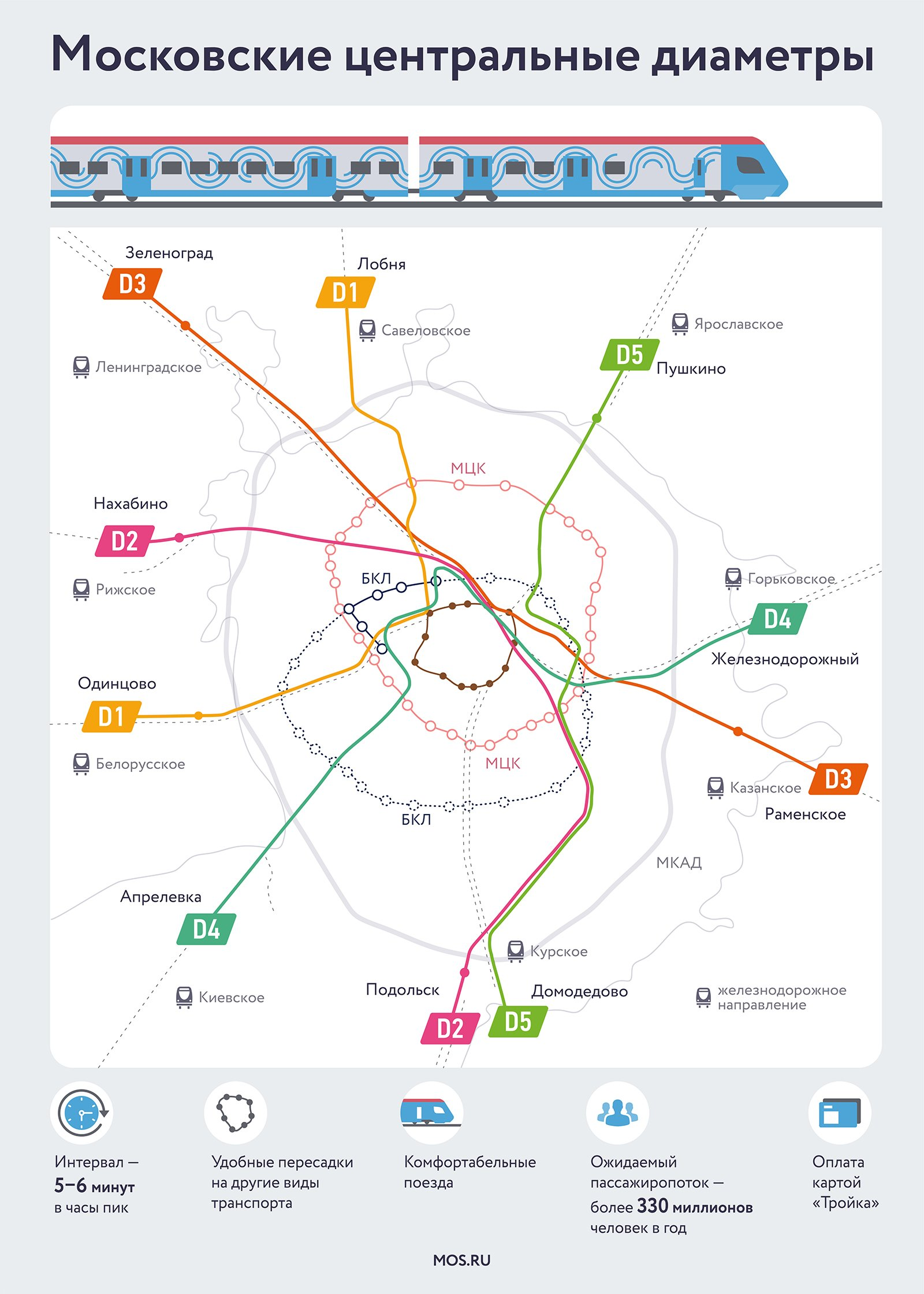
Map of the Moscow Central Diameters

The Moscow Central Diameters are another system, forming a "genuine S-Bahn" as a railway designed for "suburbia-city-suburbia" use. They are a pass-through railway system, created by constructing bypasses from "vokzals" (terminal stations)—for example, by avoiding the central stations of the pre-existing Moscow Railway, previously used for both intercity and urban-suburban travel—and forming a train line across Moscow's center.

Of the five lines projected for the Moscow Central Diameters, the first two were completed and launched on 21 November 2019.

=== Roads ===
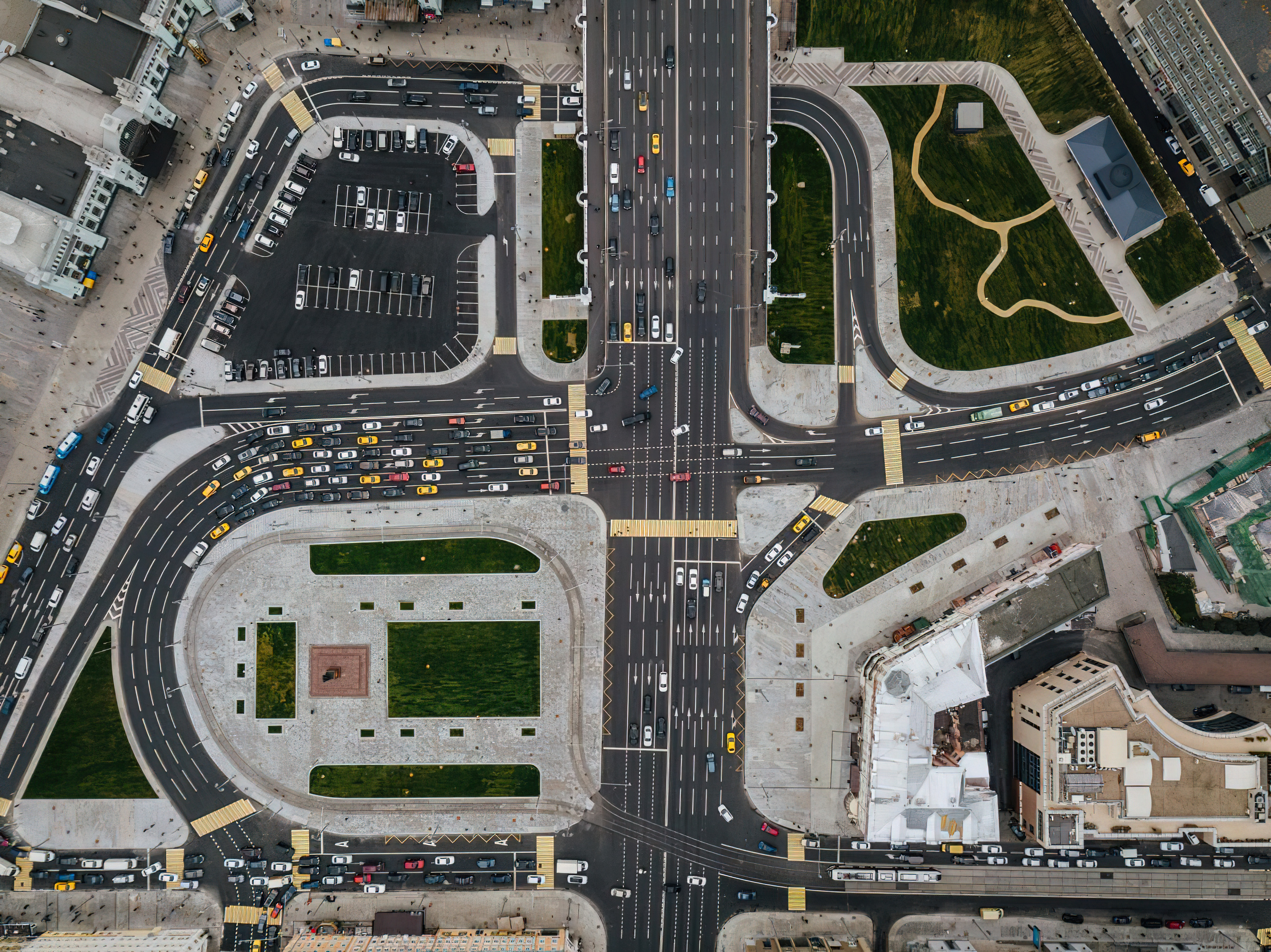
Intersection at Tverskaya Zastava Square

There are more than 2.6 million cars in Moscow each day. This number has grown in recent years; as a result, traffic jams and insufficient parking space have become major problems.

The Moscow Ring Road (MKAD)—along with the Third Transport Ring and the canceled Fourth Transport Ring—is one of only three freeways running within city limits. Several other roadway systems form concentric circles around the city.

=== Air ===
Five primary commercial airports serve Moscow: Sheremetyevo (SVO), Domodedovo (DME), Vnukovo (VKO), Zhukovsky (ZIA), Ostafyevo (OSF).

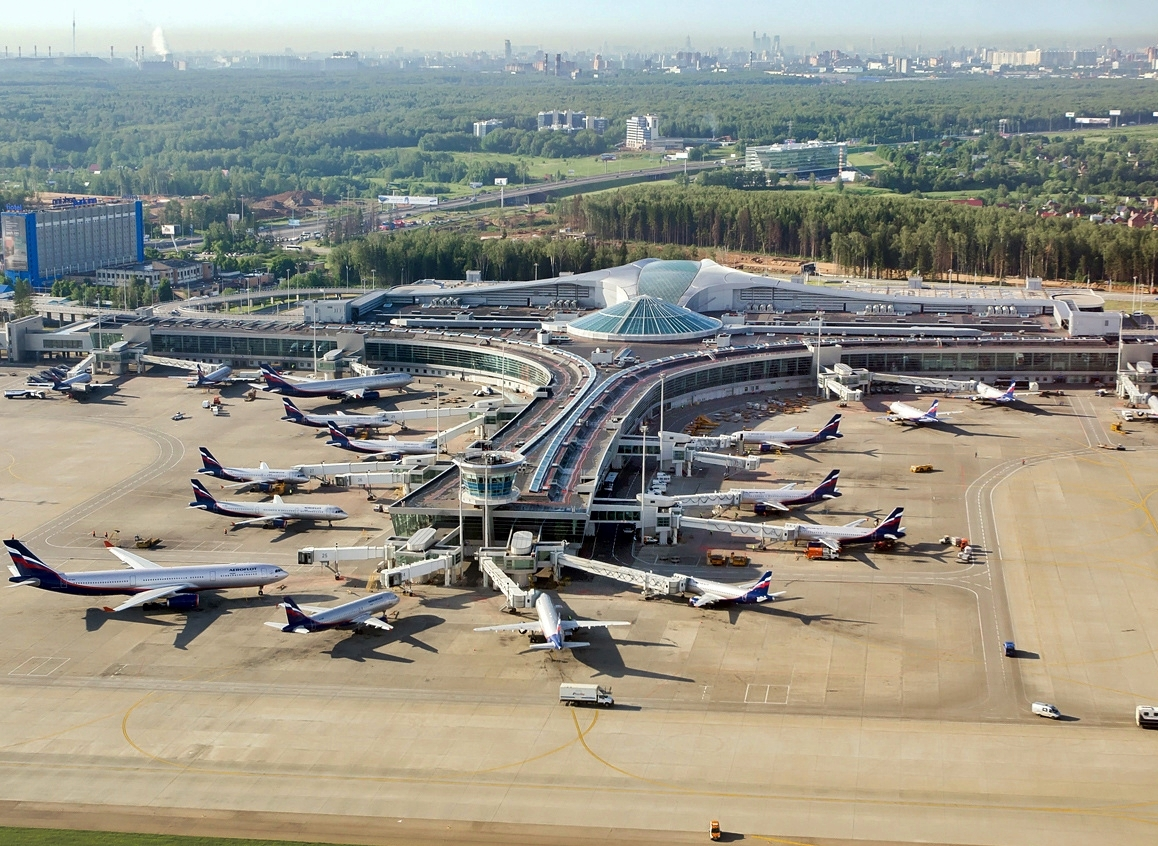
Sheremetyevo, the busiest airport in Russia, is ranked as the 11th-busiest airport in Europe.

Sheremetyevo International Airport is Moscow's most globally connected airport, handling 60% of international flights. This airport is a hub for all members of the SkyTeam airline alliance, as well as the main hub for the airline Aeroflot (a member of SkyTeam). Domodedovo International Airport is Russia's leading airport in passenger traffic, and is the primary gateway to long-haul domestic and CIS destinations; its international traffic rivals that of Sheremetyevo. Domodedovo is a hub for S7 Airlines, and most OneWorld and Star Alliance members use Domodedovo as their international hub. Vnukovo International Airport handles flights for Turkish Airlines, Wizz Air Abu Dhabi, and other airlines. Ostafyevo International Airport handles primarily business aviation.

Moscow's airports vary in distance from the MKAD beltway. A list of these airports from farthest to nearest is as follows:

- Domodedovo—22 kilometers (14 mi)
- Vnukovo—11 kilometers (7 mi)
- Sheremetyevo—10 kilometers (6 mi)
- Ostafievo—about 8 kilometers (5.0 mi)

A number of smaller airports are located near Moscow—19 in Moscow Oblast. An example is Myachkovo Airport. These airports are intended for private aircraft, helicopters, and charters.

=== Water ===
Moscow has two passenger terminals (South River Terminal and North River Terminal) on the Moskva River. There are regular ship routes and cruises along the Moskva and Oka rivers, which are used mostly for entertainment. The North River Terminal, built in 1937, is the main hub for long-range river routes. In addition, three freight ports serve Moscow.

Moscow is connected via the Moscow Canal to Russia's Unified Deep Water System, a large system of canals and rivers in European Russia. This system gives the city water access to five seas: the White Sea, Baltic Sea, Caspian Sea, Sea of Azov, and the Black Sea. For this reason, Moscow is sometimes called the "port of the five seas" (Russian: порт пяти морей).

=== Vehicle sharing system ===
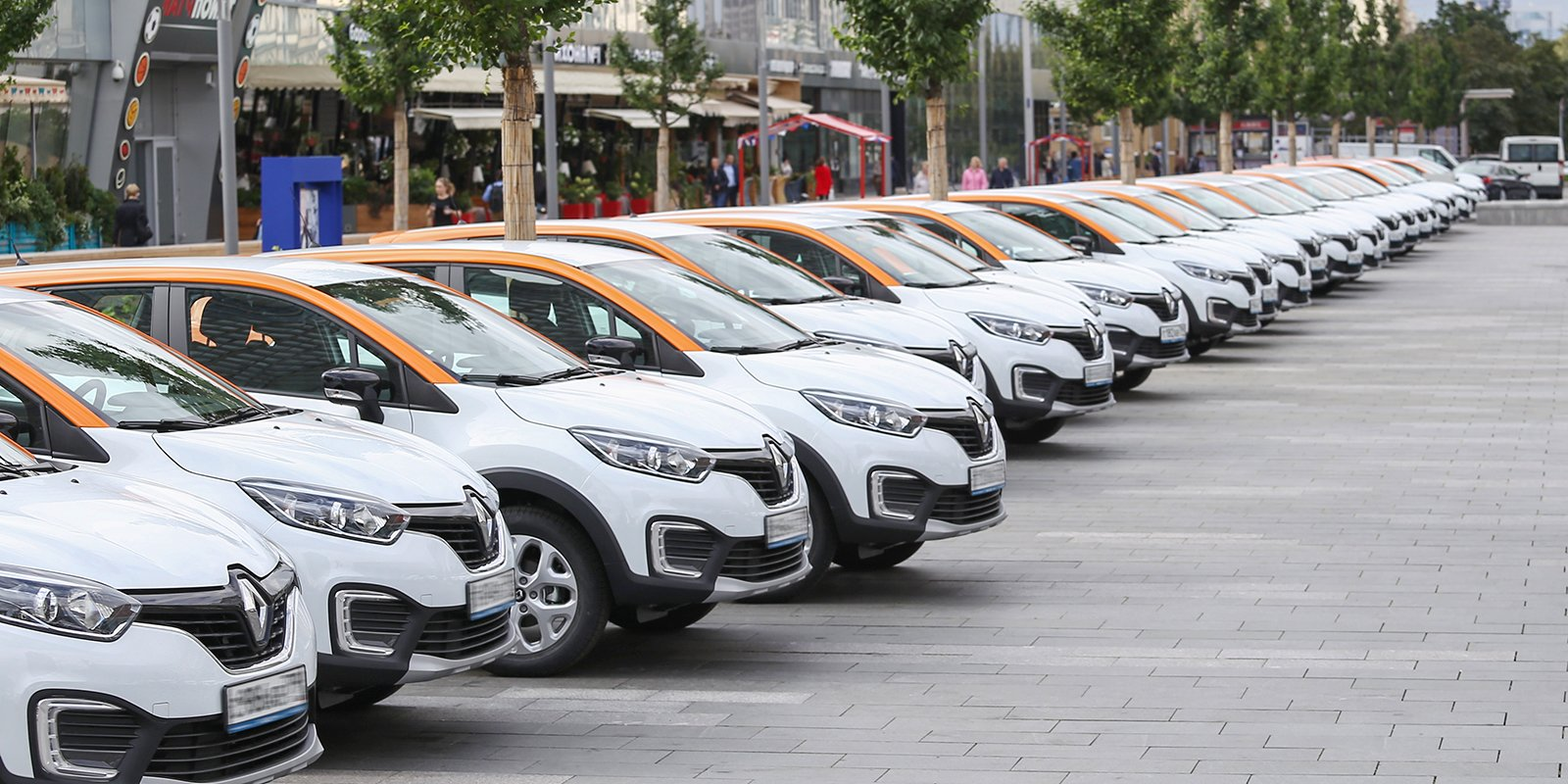
As of 2020, Moscow has the world's largest fleet of carsharing vehicles, with more than 30,000 cars.

Moscow offers vehicle sharing options that are sponsored by the local government. Several car-sharing companies are responsible for providing cars to the population. To drive one of these cars, a user must book it through the app (application software) of the owning company. In 2018, Mayor Sergey Sobyanin said that Moscow's car-sharing system had become Europe's largest fleet. Every day, about 25,000 people used this service. By the end of that year, Moscow carsharing had become the world's second largest, with 16,500 vehicles available. Another sharing system is bike sharing (Moscow's Velobike system), with a fleet of 3000 traditional and electric bicycles. The Delisamokat is a new sharing service providing electric scooters.

=== Future development ===
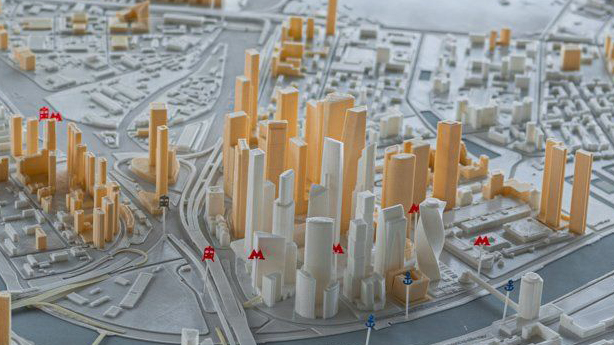
The 2020 development concept of the Moscow International Business Center and its adjacent territory implies the construction of more skyscrapers from 2020 to 2027.

In 1992, the Moscow government began planning a new area in central Moscow—the Moscow International Business Center—to create a zone, the first in Russia and Eastern Europe, to combine business activity, living space, and entertainment. Situated in the Presnensky District and located at the Third Ring, the Moscow City area is undergoing intensive development. The Moscow International Business Center (MIBC) is being constructed on the Krasnopresnenskaya embankment. The project occupies up to one square kilometer (250 acres). That area is the only location in downtown Moscow able to accommodate a project of such size. Most pre-existing buildings in that area are old factories and industrial complexes.

Demonstrating the MIBC's scale, the Federation Tower, completed in 2016, is the second-tallest building in Europe. The project's broader plans include a water park and other recreational facilities; business, office, entertainment, and residential buildings; a transport network; and a new site for the Moscow government. Four new metro stations in the area have been built; two of these have opened, and two others are reserved for future metro lines crossing the MIBC. Additional stations were planned.

In addition, a rail shuttle service is planned to directly connect the MIBC with the Sheremetyevo International Airport. Major thoroughfares through the MIBC are the Third Ring and Kutuzovsky Prospekt.

Three metro stations were initially planned for the Filyovskaya Line. The Delovoi Tsentr station opened in 2005 and was renamed Vystavochnaya in 2009. The branch extended to the Mezhdunarodnaya station in 2006; all work on the third station, Dorogomilovskaya (between Kiyevskaya and Delovoi Tsentr), has been postponed. The branch is planned for extension as far as the Savyolovskaya station, on the Serpukhovsko-Timiryazevskaya Line.

On 5 March 2021, the company MTS announced the launch of the country's first pilot 5G network in Moscow.

== Media ==
Nearly all of Russia's nationwide television networks, radio stations, newspapers, and magazines are headquartered in Moscow.

=== Newspapers ===
English-language newspapers include The Moscow Times. Until its closure in 2014, The Moscow News was the oldest English-language weekly newspaper in Russia. Kommersant, Vedomosti, and Novaya Gazeta are Russian-language newspapers headquartered in Moscow. Kommersant and Vedomosti are among the country's oldest Russian-language business newspapers.

=== Television and radio ===
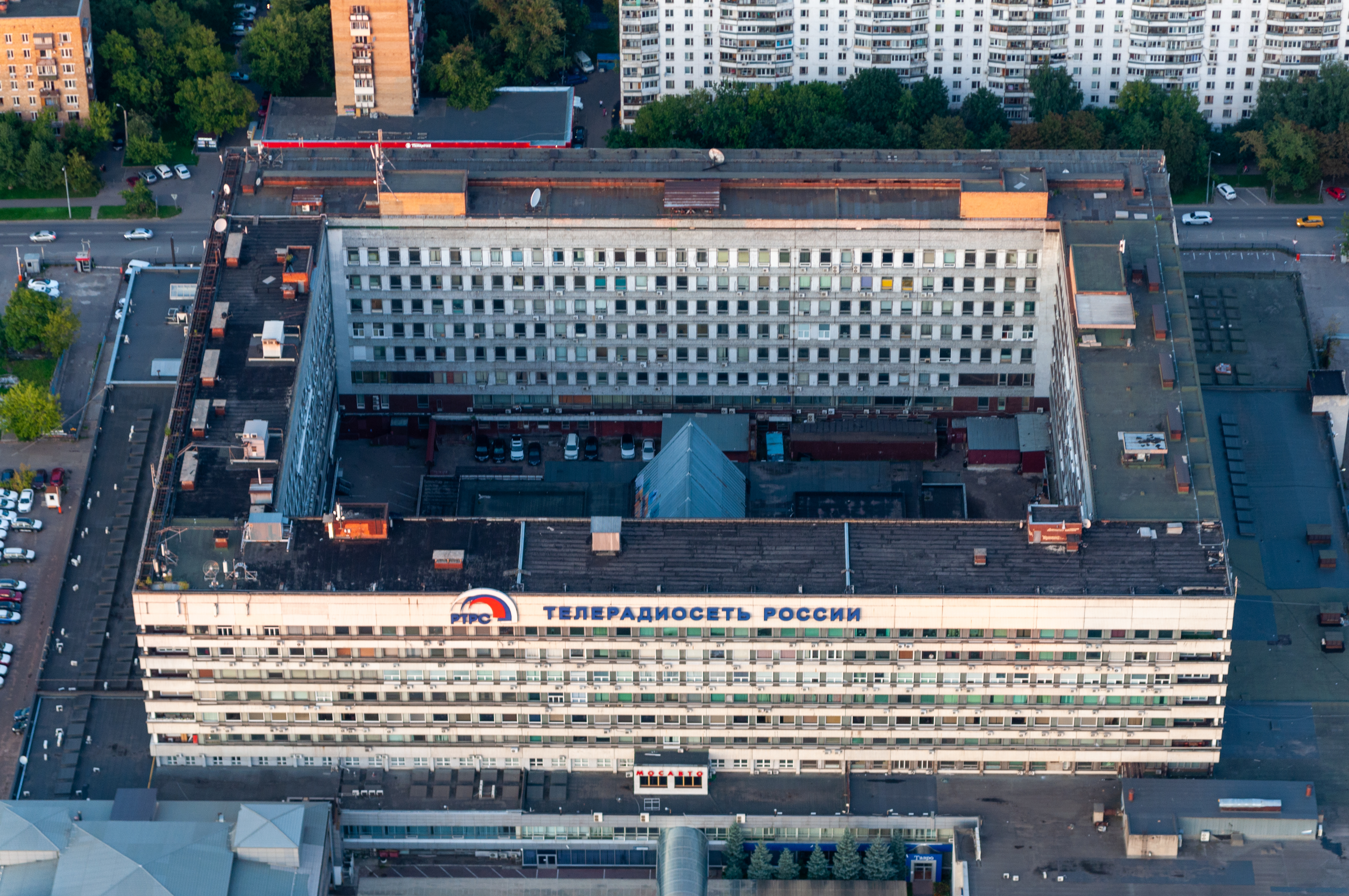
The RTRN building

Other media in Moscow include the Echo of Moscow (Russian: Эхо Москвы), the first Soviet and Russian private news radio and information agency, and NTV, one of the first privately owned Russian television stations. The number of FM radio stations in Moscow totals about 50.

Moscow television networks:

- Channel One
- Russia-1
- Russia-2
- NTV
- TV Tsentr
- Channel 5
- Rossiya Kultura
- Russia-24
- Public Television of Russia
- REN TV
- STS
- TNT
- TV-3
- Zvezda
- Domashny
- Carousel
- Peretz
- Euronews
- 2x2
- Pyatnica!
- Disney Channel
- RBC
- Moskva 24
- TV Rain
- RU.TV
- Petersburg – Channel 5

Moscow radio stations:

- "Russian (Russkoye) Radio"
- "Europa Plus"
- "DFM"
- "NRJ (Russia)"
- "Radio Maximum"
- "Voice of Russia (in English)"
- "Radio Freedom (Svoboda)"
- "Megapolis FM"
- "Radio Kultura (Culture)"
- "Pioneer FM"
- "Zvezda"
- "Komsomolskaya Pravda"
- "Orpheus"
- "Monte Carlo"
- "Love Radio"
- "The Main" Главная
- "Govorit Moskva"
- "Radio Dacha"
- "Nashe Radio"
- "Radio 7"
- "Humor FM"
- "Retro FM"
- "Ultra"
- "Keks FM"
- "Carnival"
- "Dobrye Pesni (Good Songs)"
- "Voyage FM"
- "Kino FM"
- "Finam FM"
- "First Popular"
- "Politseiskaya Volna (Police Wave)"
- "Radio Sport"
- "Radio Rossii"
- "Radio Podmoskovye"
- "Radiocompany Moscow"
- "UFM"
- "Mayak"
- "Business FM"
- "Autoradio"
- "Moya Semya (My Family)"
- "XFM"
- "Fresh Radio"
- "Silver Rain"
- "Chanson"
- "M-Radio"
- "Orphey"
- "Echo of Moscow"
- "Radio Jazz"
- "Classic Radio"
- "Vesti FM"
- "City FM"
- "Relax FM"
- "Kommersant FM"
- "Rock FM"
- "Children's Radio"
- "Radio Alla"
- "Best FM"
- "Next FM"
- "Hit FM"
- "Radio Record"
- "Capital FM Moscow"

== Notable people ==
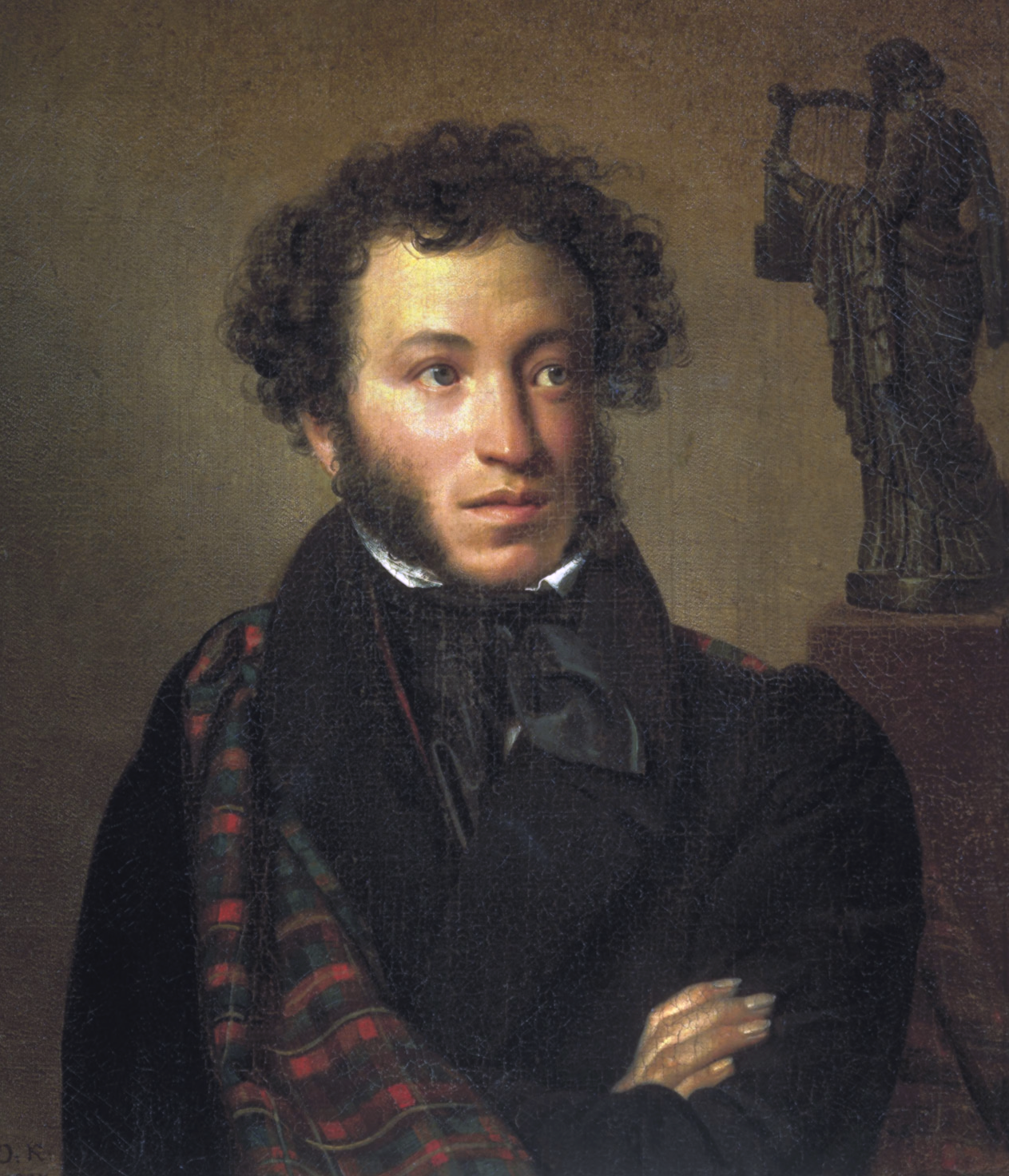
Writer Alexander Pushkin, the founder of modern Russian literature, was born in Moscow in 1799.

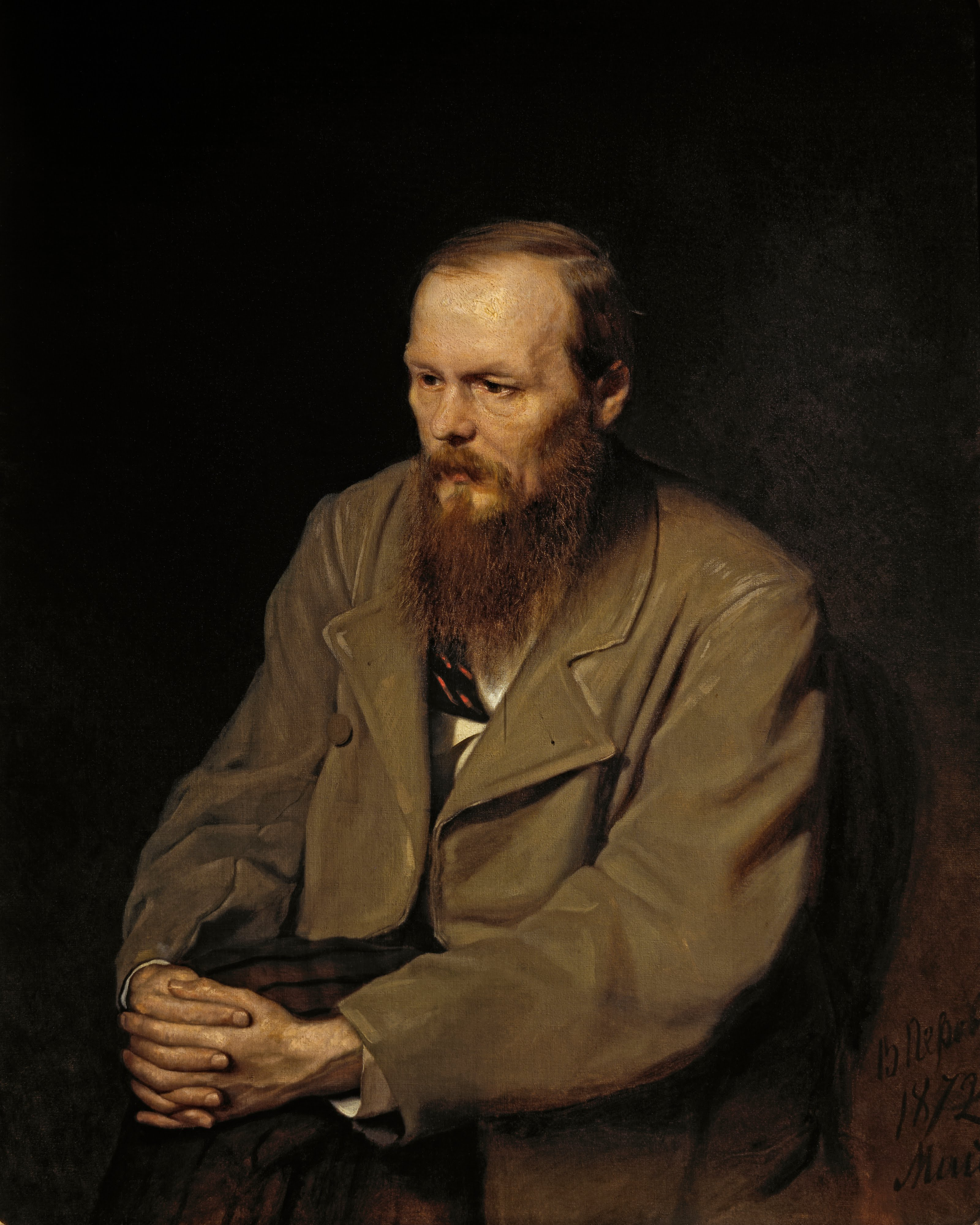
Novelist and philosopher Fyodor Dostoevsky was born in Moscow in 1821.

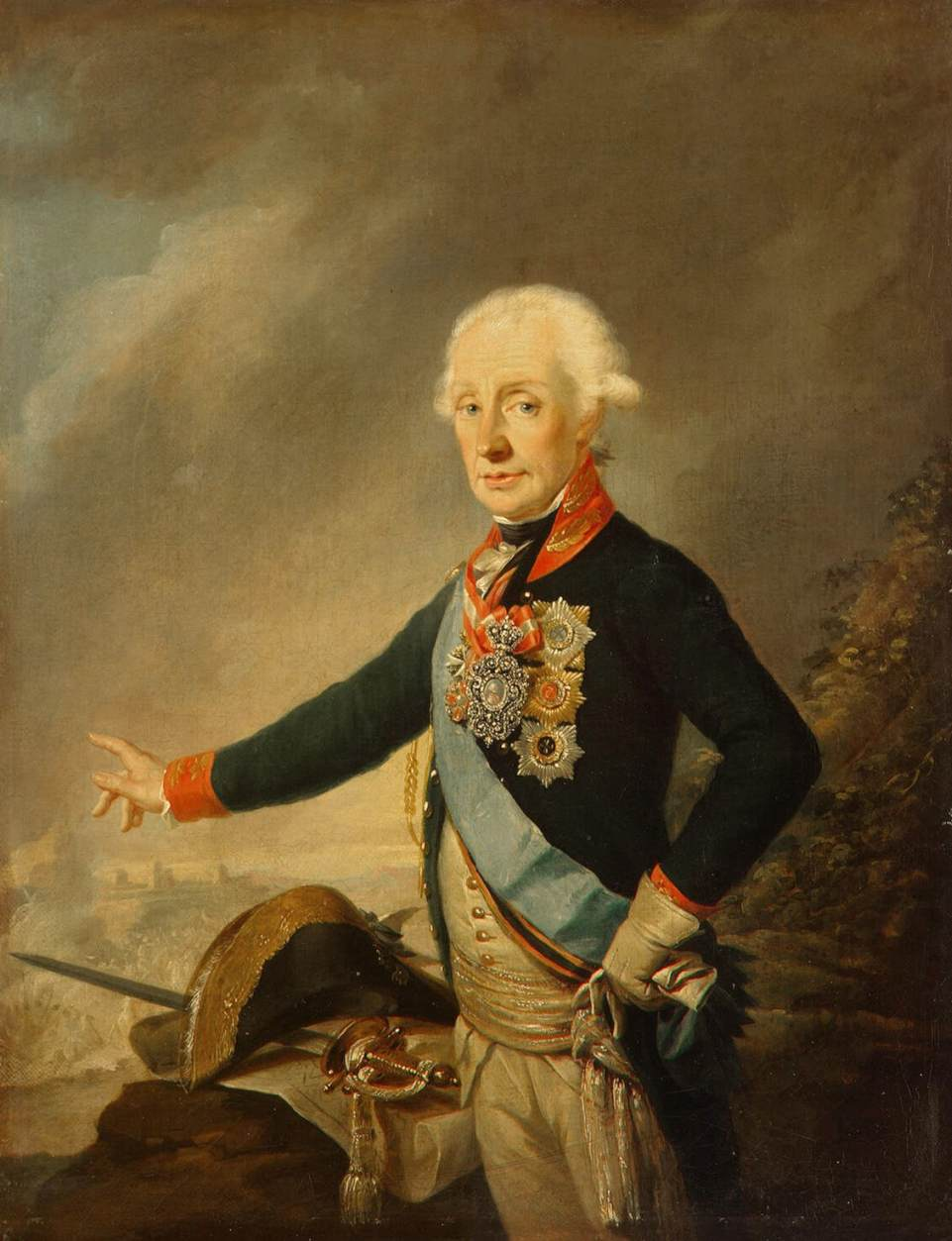
Military commander Alexander Suvorov was born in Moscow in 1730.

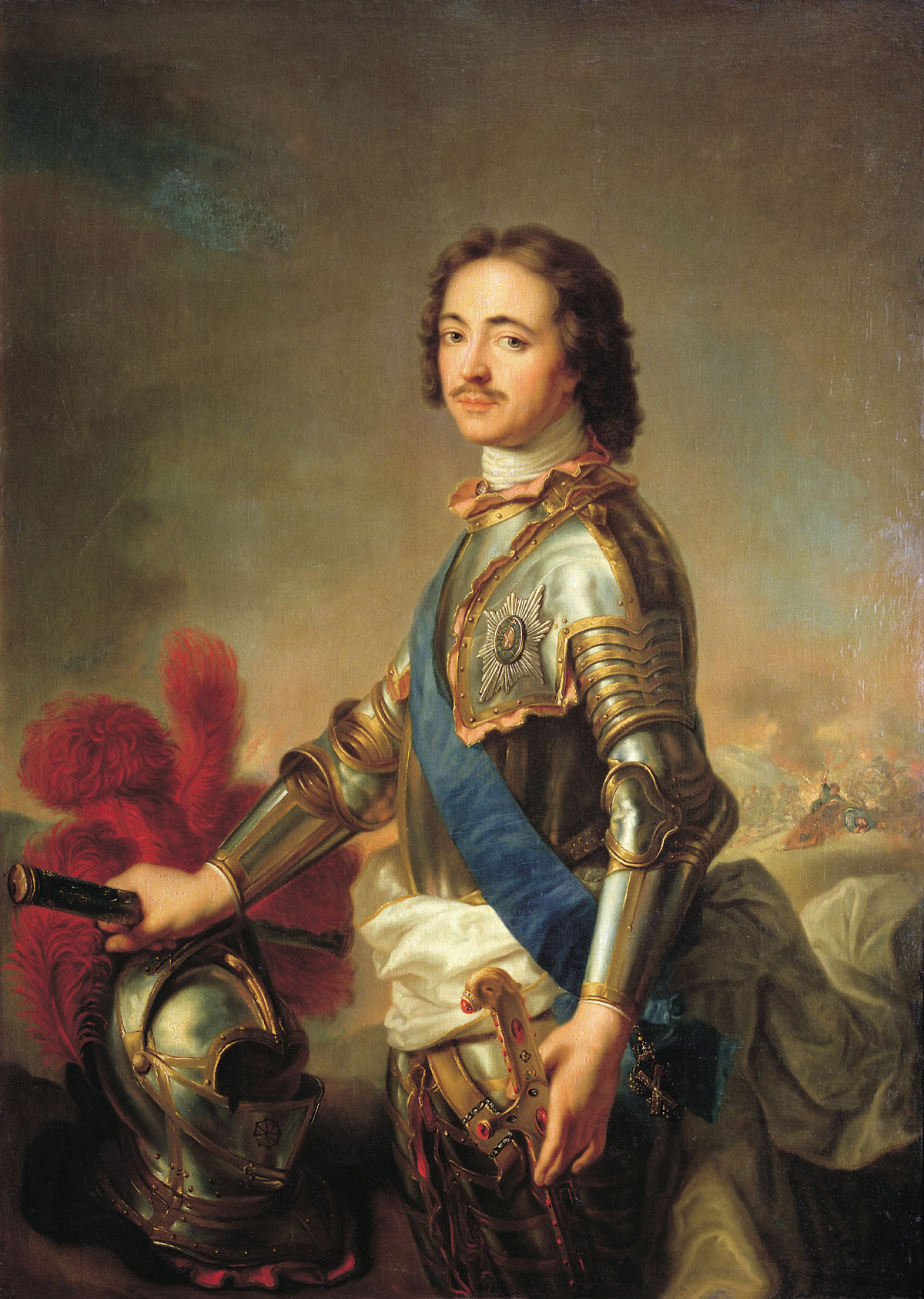
Tsar Peter the Great was born in Moscow in 1672.

== International relations ==
=== Twin towns and sister cities ===
Moscow is twinned with the following cities:

- Almaty, Kazakhstan
- Ankara, Turkey
- Astana, Kazakhstan
- Baku, Azerbaijan
- Bangkok, Thailand
- Beijing, China
- Bucharest, Romania
- Buenos Aires, Argentina
- Cusco, Peru
- Dubai, United Arab Emirates
- Ganja, Azerbaijan
- Ho Chi Minh City, Vietnam
- Jakarta, Indonesia
- Ljubljana, Slovenia
- London, United Kingdom
- Manila, Philippines
- New Delhi, India
- Pyongyang, North Korea
- Rasht, Iran
- Reykjavík, Iceland
- Riga, Latvia
- Seoul, South Korea
- Tashkent, Uzbekistan
- Tehran, Iran
- Tokyo, Japan
- Ulaanbaatar, Mongolia

=== Cooperation agreements ===
Moscow has cooperation agreements with the following cities:

- Bangkok, Thailand (1997)
- Lisbon, Portugal (1997)
- Madrid, Spain (2006)
- Tel Aviv, Israel (2001)
- Tunis, Tunisia (1998)
- Yerevan, Armenia (1995)

=== Former twin towns and sister cities ===
Moscow's former twin towns and sister cities include the following:

- Berlin, Germany (suspended because of the Russo-Ukrainian war)
- Brno, Czech Republic (terminated because of the Russo-Ukrainian war)
- Chicago, United States (suspended because of the Russo-Ukrainian war)
- Düsseldorf, Germany (suspended because of the Russo-Ukrainian war)
- Kharkiv, Ukraine
- Kyiv, Ukraine
- Prague, Czech Republic (suspended since 2014 because of the Russo-Ukrainian war)
- Tallinn, Estonia
- Vilnius, Lithuania
- Warsaw, Poland (terminated because of the Russo-Ukrainian war)

== See also ==
- List of churches in Moscow
- List of Moscow tourist attractions
- List of museums in Moscow
- List of shopping malls in Moscow
- Mayor of Moscow
- Moscow Millionaire Fair

== Sources ==
- Bushkovitch, Paul (5 December 2011). A Concise History of Russia. Cambridge University Press. ISBN 978-1-139-50444-7.
- Crummey, Robert O. (6 June 2014). The Formation of Muscovy 1300 - 1613. Routledge. ISBN 978-1-317-87200-9.
- Fennell, John (15 November 2023). The Emergence of Moscow, 1304–1359. Univ of California Press. ISBN 978-0-520-34759-5.
- Kuchkin, Vladimir A. (2013). "Московское великое княжество" [Grand Principality of Moscow]. In Kravets, S. L. (ed.). Большая российская энциклопедия. Том 21: Монголы — Наноматериалы (in Russian). Большая российская энциклопедия. pp. 308–310. ISBN 978-5-85270-355-2. Archived from the original on 20 May 2026.
- Riasanovsky, Nicholas V.; Steinberg, Mark D. (2019). A history of Russia (Ninth ed.). New York: Oxford University Press. ISBN 978-0-19-064558-8.
- Smirnova, E. S. (2013). "Московская школа" [Moscow school]. In Kravets, S. L. (ed.). Большая Российская энциклопедия. Том 21: Монголы — Наноматериалы (in Russian). Большая Российская энциклопедия. pp. 273–274. ISBN 978-5-85270-355-2.
