= Terrasses du port =

Les Terrasses du Port
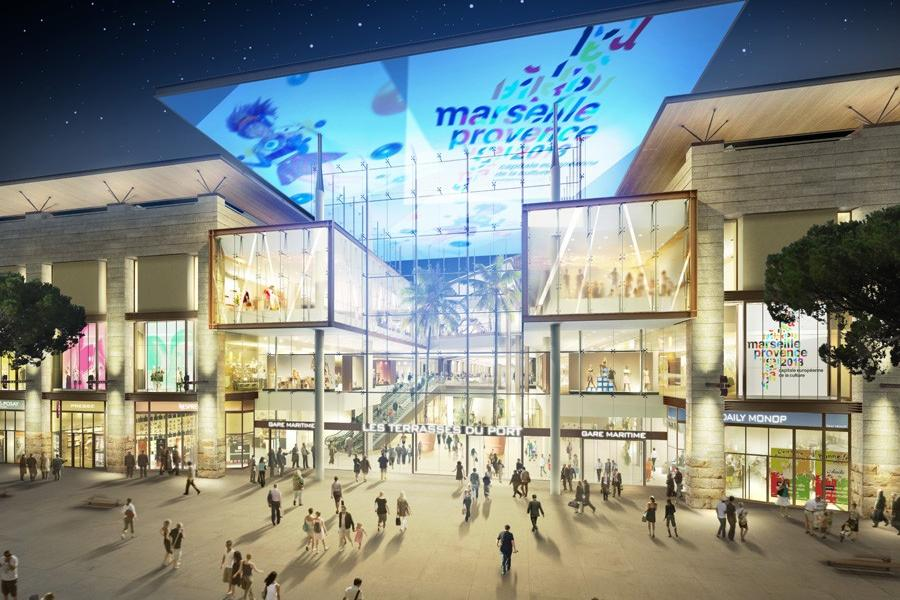
- Entrance exterior conceptual rendering of the Terrasses du Port at night
- Location: Marseille, France
- Coordinates: 43°18′26″N 5°21′55″E
- Opened: 24 May 2014
- Developer: Hammerson
- Architect: C Concept Design and 4A Architectes
- Num. of stores: 190
- Floor area: 230,000 square meters
- Floors: 4
- Parking: 2600
- Website: http://terrassesduport.fr

The Terrasses du Port is a commercial shopping center situated in the 2nd arrondissement of Marseille. The retail format contains 190 shops, including both domestic and international brands. The mall, which opened in the spring of 2014 also sports a balcony of 2,600 square meters, offering a view of the port, La Joliette, hence the building's name, which translates to "The Port Terraces".

The shopping mall was designed by French architect Michel Pétuaud-Létang of 4A Architects, Matthew VanderBorgh of the Netherlands-based firm, C Concept Design, and the design consulting firms Ingérop and Barbanel. The development was financially supported by the British property development and investment company, Hammerson.

== Context ==
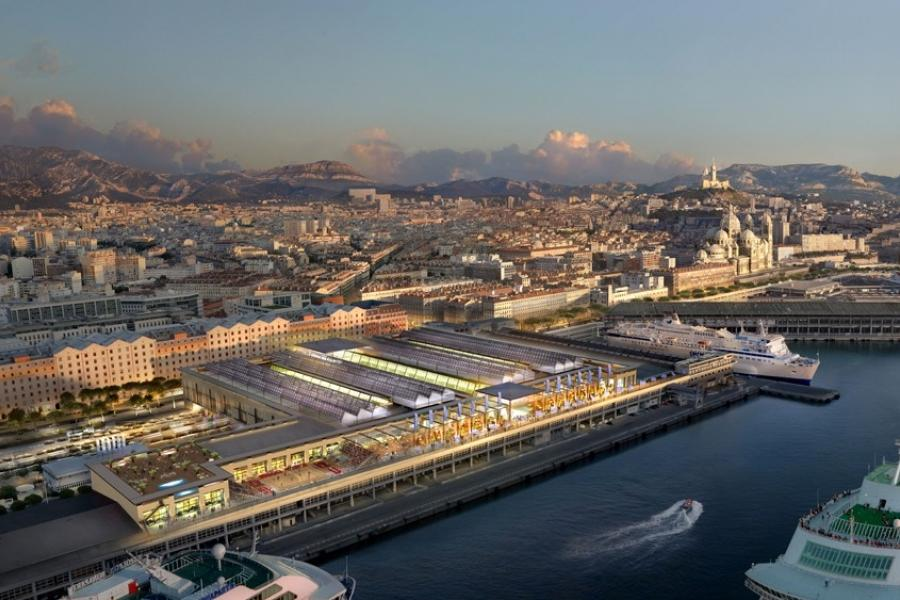
The seafront view of the Terrasses du Port extends an impressive 260 meters

The Terrasses du Port sits on the Boulevard du Littoral, between the sea and the Docks. Previously, this area of the port had not been accessible by the public for many years. Erected in the heart of the Grand Seaport of Marseille (Le Grand Port Maritime de Marseille), the shopping mall plays a role in the large operation to renew and urbanize the district. The mall was designed in the modern style, influenced by the spirit of the region, combining fine materials with stone and steel.

== Features ==
- 61,000 square meters of shops
- kindergarten
- 190 shops and restaurants
- 2,600 parking spaces
- 2,600 square meters of terrace overlooking the sea
- 260 linear meters seafront facade
- 3,000 m2 space for private events and functions
- central location, accessible by all means of transportation

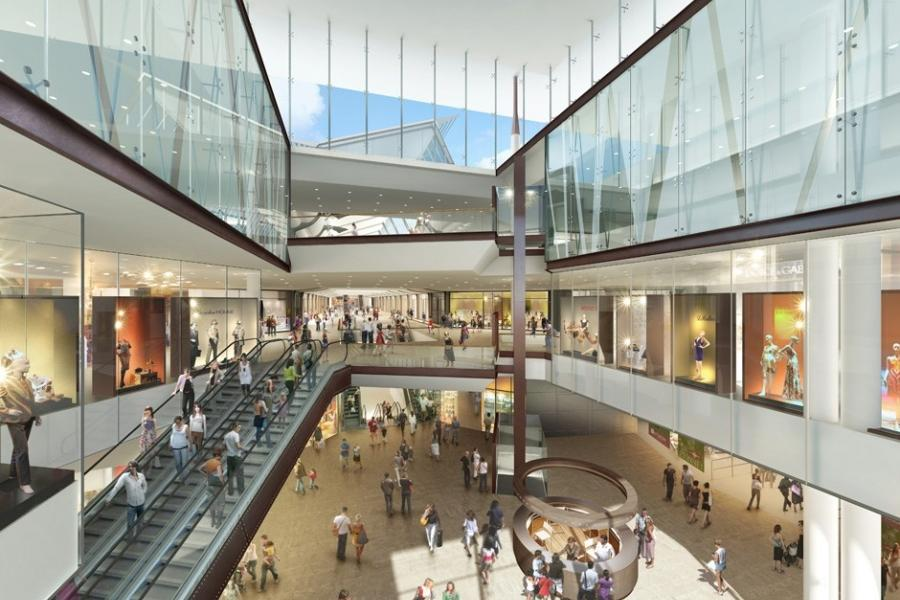
Interior conceptual rendering of the Terrasses du Port

== Sustainability ==
- attained certification level “Excellent” by BREEAM
- refills for electric cars in parking lots
- parking lots reserved for car sharing and car pooling
- installation of photovoltaic panels
- ecological garden

== Controversy ==
The construction of a shopping mall of this size in the center of Marseille was forbidden until 2001. This ban was lifted by the municipality UMP by Jean-Claude Gaudin so as to recapture some of the commercial trade conducted in shopping malls on the outskirts of Marseille, as seen in Plan de Campagne in nearby Cabriès. The choice to lift the ban was contested by the Socialist Party in the municipal elections of 2008, where it was feared that the center's opening would negatively impact small businesses and shops of center city.

== Shops ==
Terrasses du Port has the following stores:

Zara, Mango, Lacoste, Jeff de Bruges, Alain Afflelou, Uniqlo, Orange, Franck Provost, Desigual, H&M, G-Star, Pepe Jeans, Kaporal 5, Adidas, Etam, Yves Rocher, La Savonnerie Marseillaise, Monoprix, Célio, Jules, Sephora, Guess, Quiksilver, Michael Kors, Starbucks Coffee, La Grande Récré, L'Occitane en Provence, Hugo Boss, Petit Bateau, Levi's, Geox, Décathlon, Redskins, Van's, Courir, Darty, Bose, Crocs, American Vintage, Tumi, Armand Thiery, Hédiard, Eleven Paris, Catimini, Okaïdi, Little Marcel, Marionnaud, Esprit, Pull & Bear, Kiko, Bizzbee, Camaïeu, IKKS, Ted Baker, Agatha, Pellegrin & Fils, Calzedonia, Bershka, Maisons du Monde, Texto, Havaianas, Kookaï, NAO do BRASIL, Tally Weijl, Accessorize, Puyricard, Cop Copine, Princess TAM TAM, Comptoir des Cotoniers, Carnet de Vol, Gant, Mauboussin, Minelli, Sandro, Superdry, Undiz, Stradivarius, JD Sport, Jonak, Izac, Pylones, Maje, Little Extra, Du Bruit dans la Cuisine, Kusmi Tea, The Kase, Yellow Korner, Carmen Steffens et bien d'autres

Restaurants in the building include the following: Vapiano, Beef House, Dalloyau, Roy René, Tommy's Diner, and Yoj by Yoji.

== See also ==
- La Joliette
