= List of shopping malls in Moscow =

This is a list of shopping malls in Moscow and Moscow Oblast in Russia.

== Malls in Moscow ==
As of January 2013, Moscow had 82 malls, including two of the largest in Europe. In 2016, data from the FourSquare social network shows that Moscow has at least 100 shopping malls. Another source lists over 280 malls. MEGA malls are series of malls located all around Russia. There are currently three MEGA malls in Moscow, with all of the being located in Moscow Oblast.

== Gallery ==
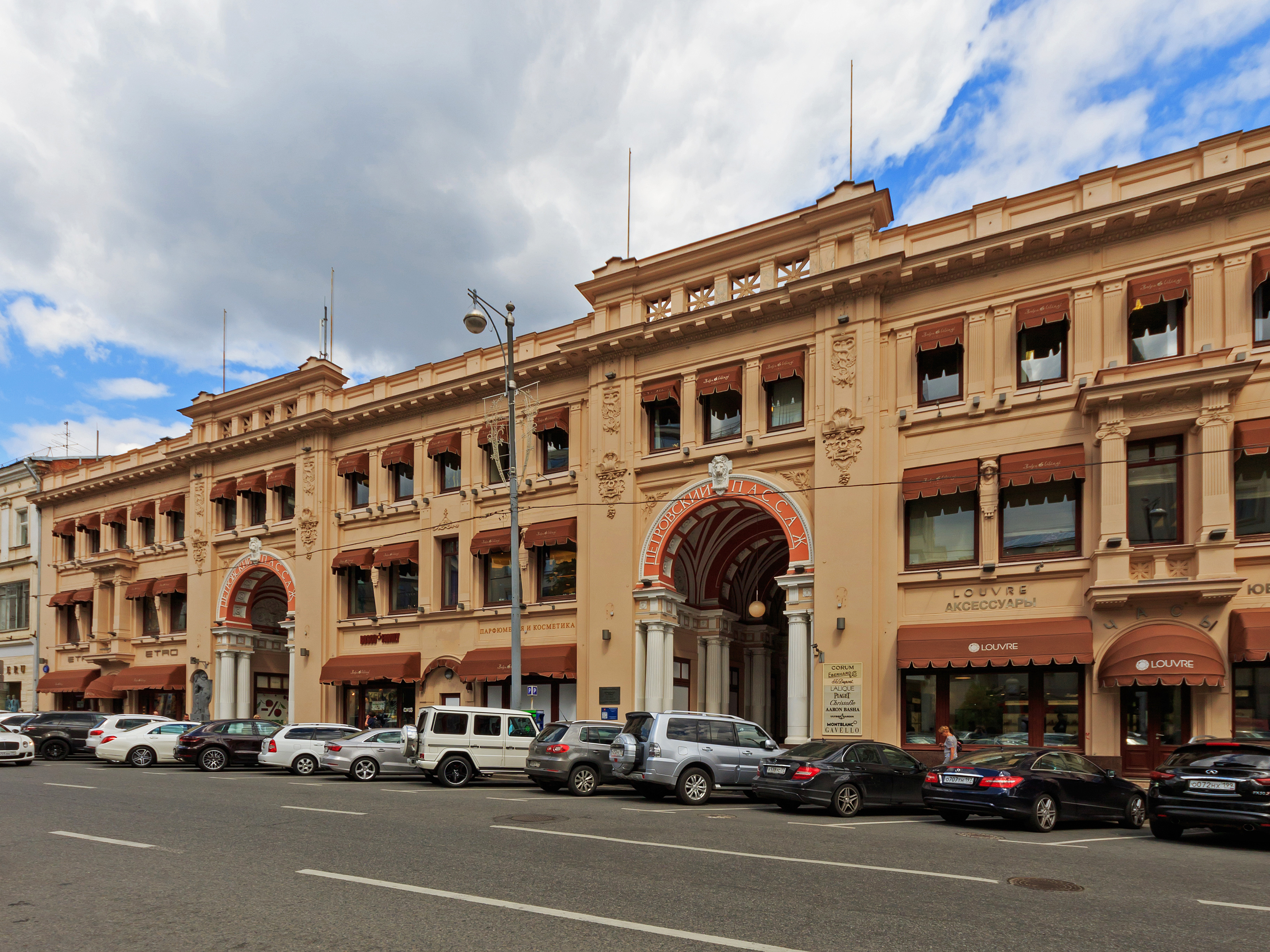
Petrovsky Passage

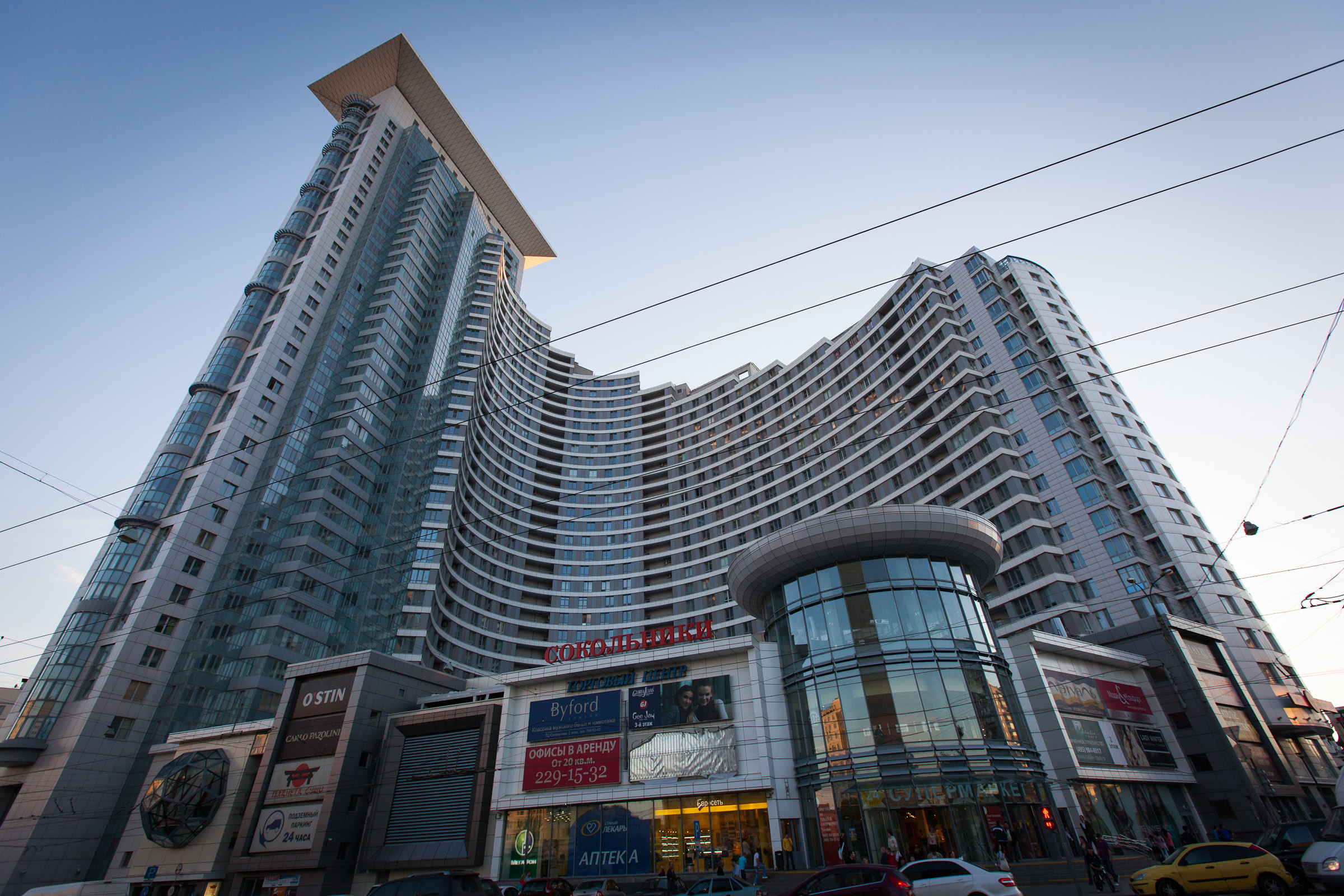
Sokolniki

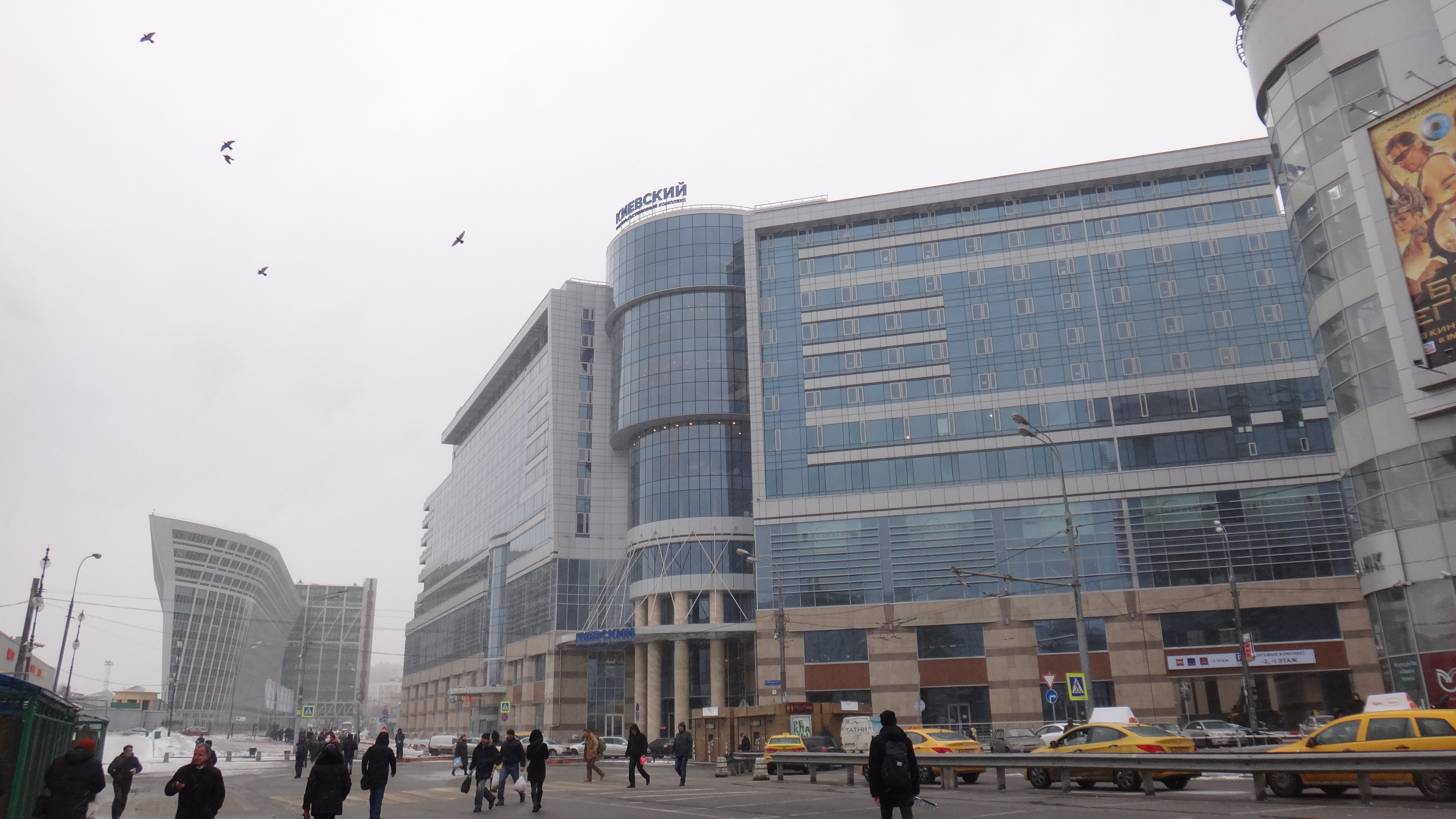
Kievsky

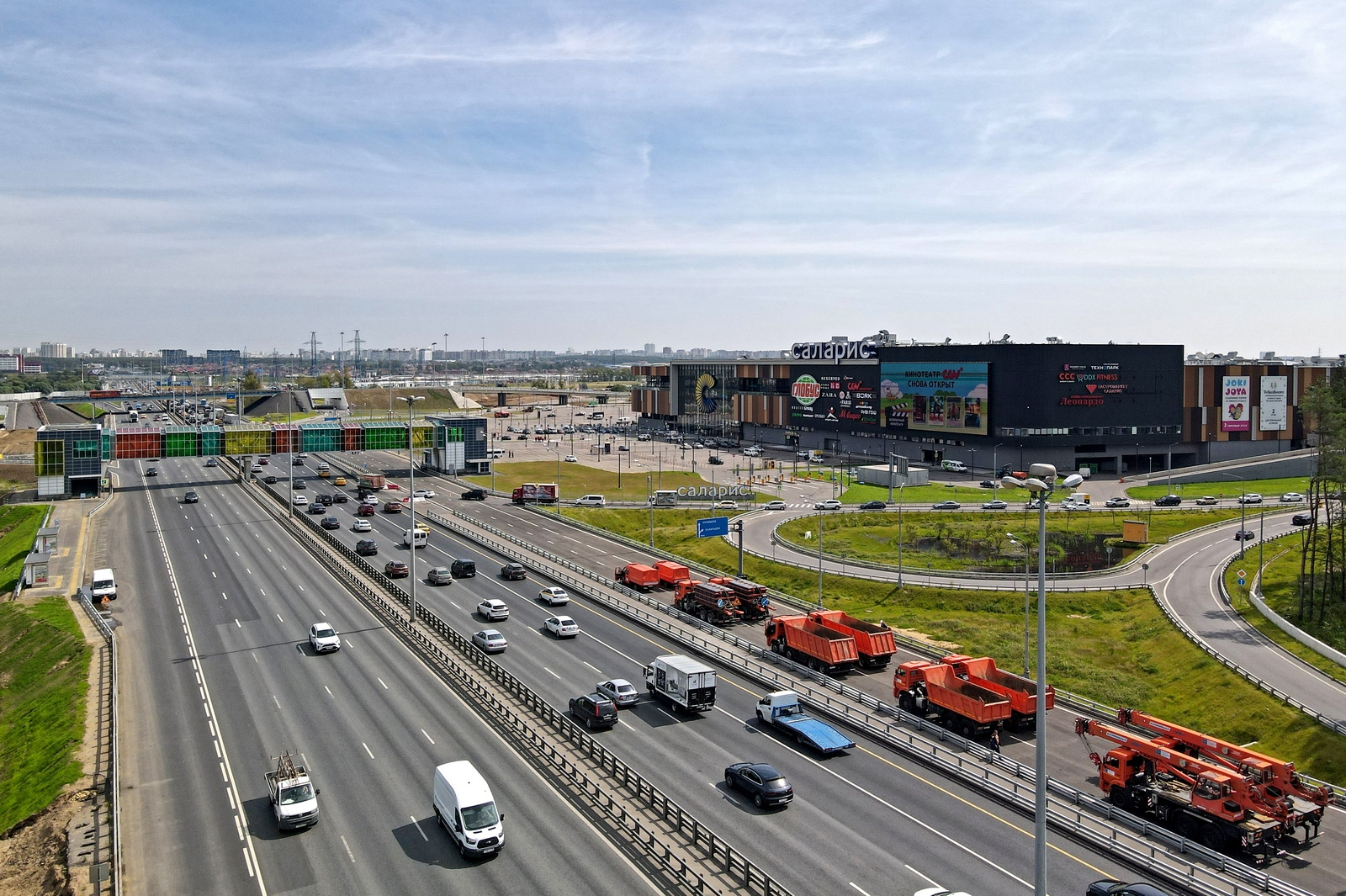
Salaris

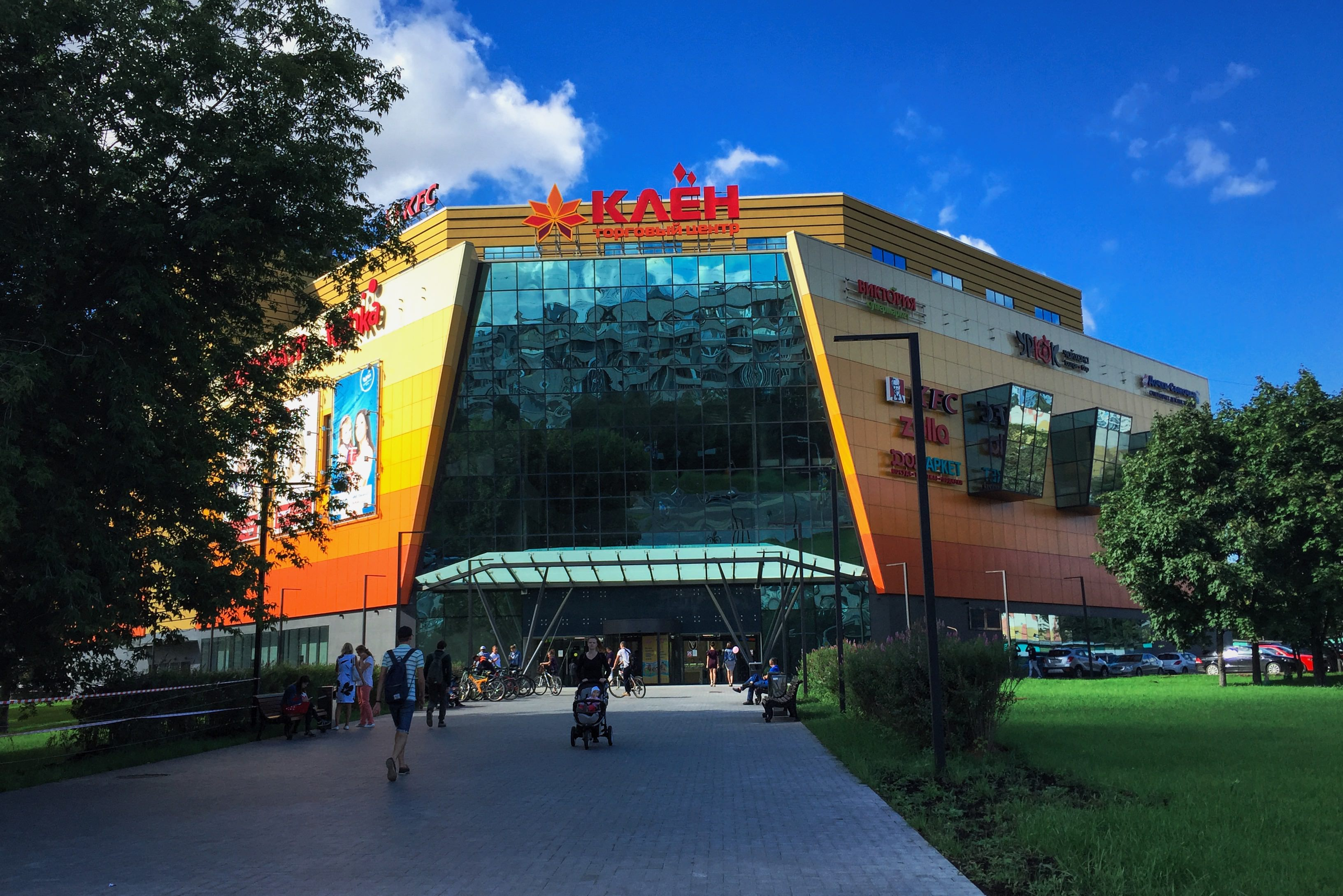
Klen

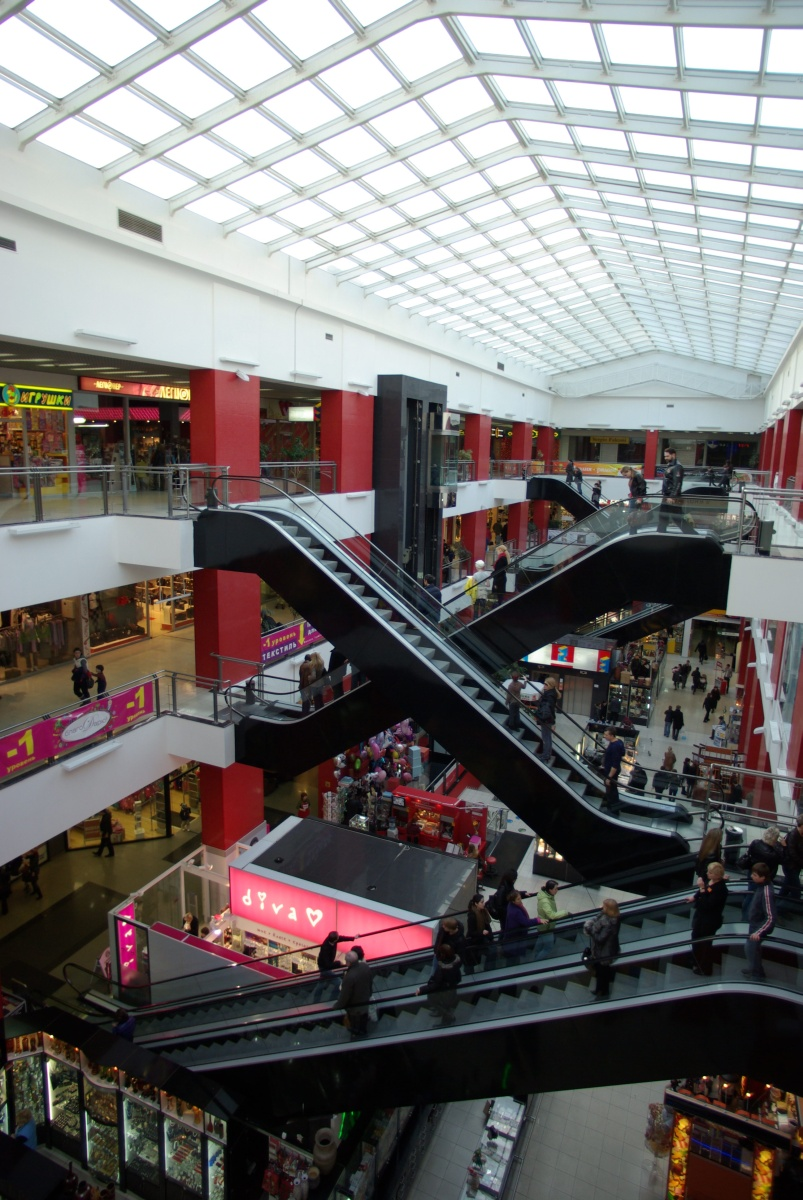
Pyataya Avenyu

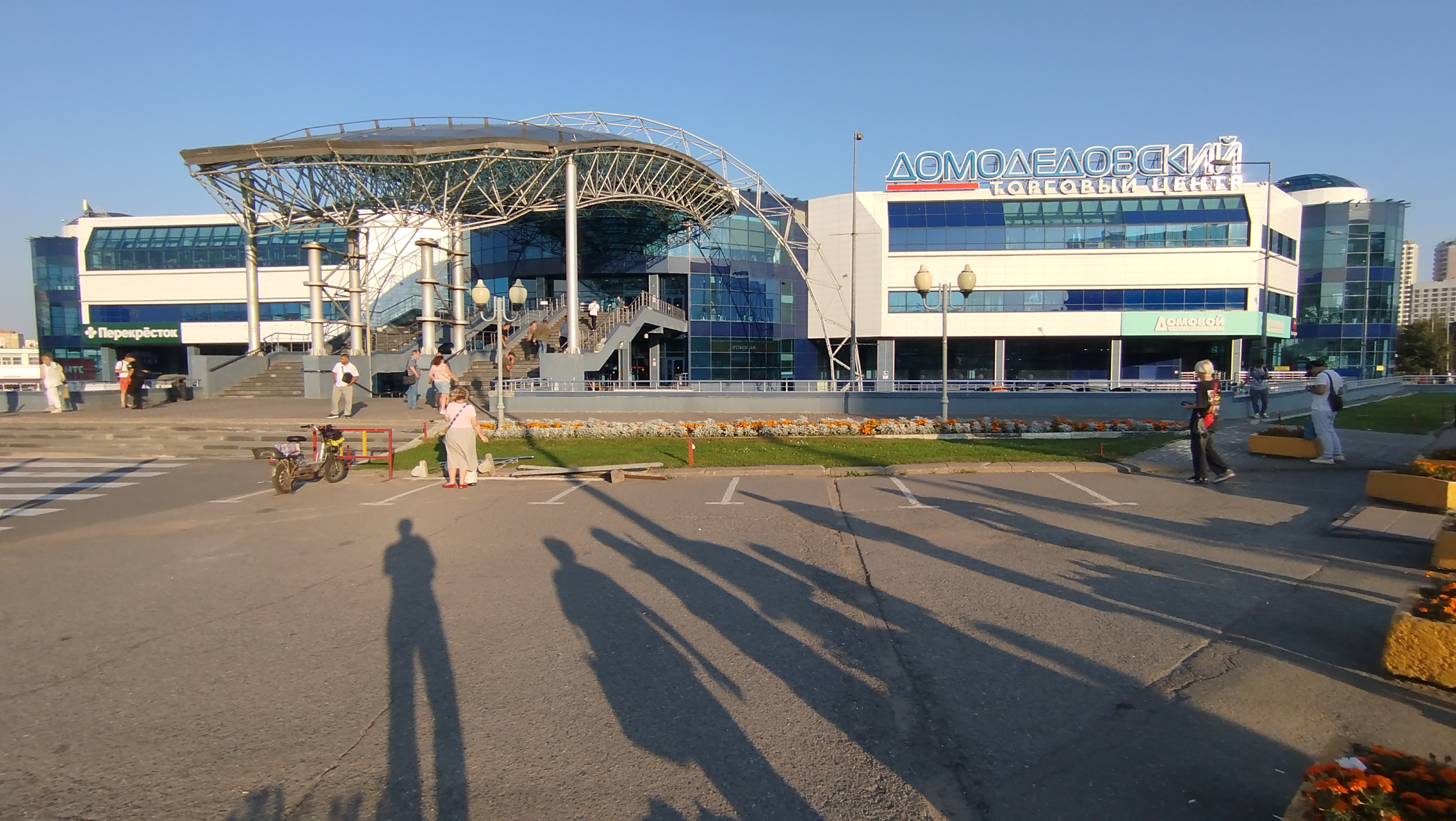
Domodedovskiy

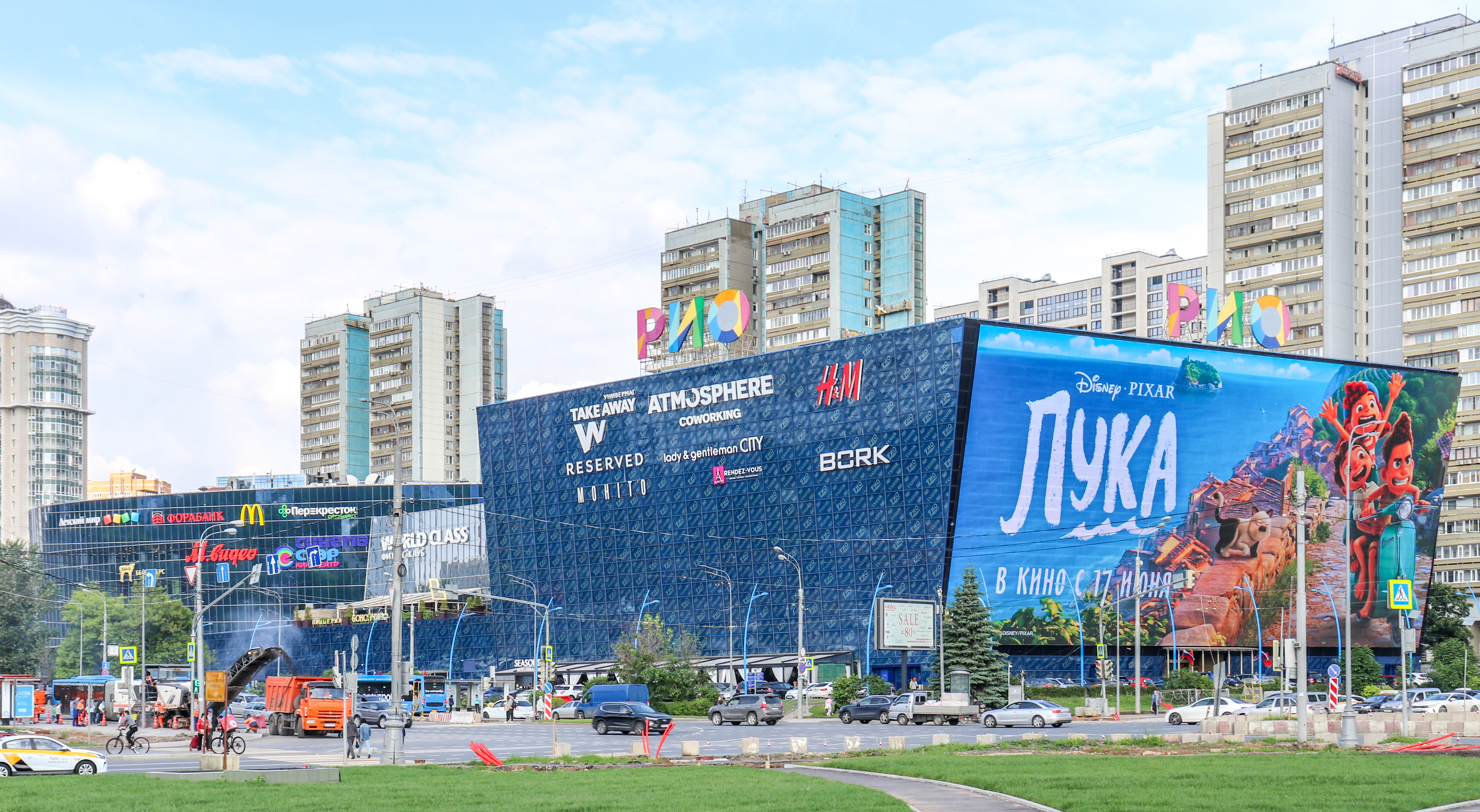
Rio Leninskiy

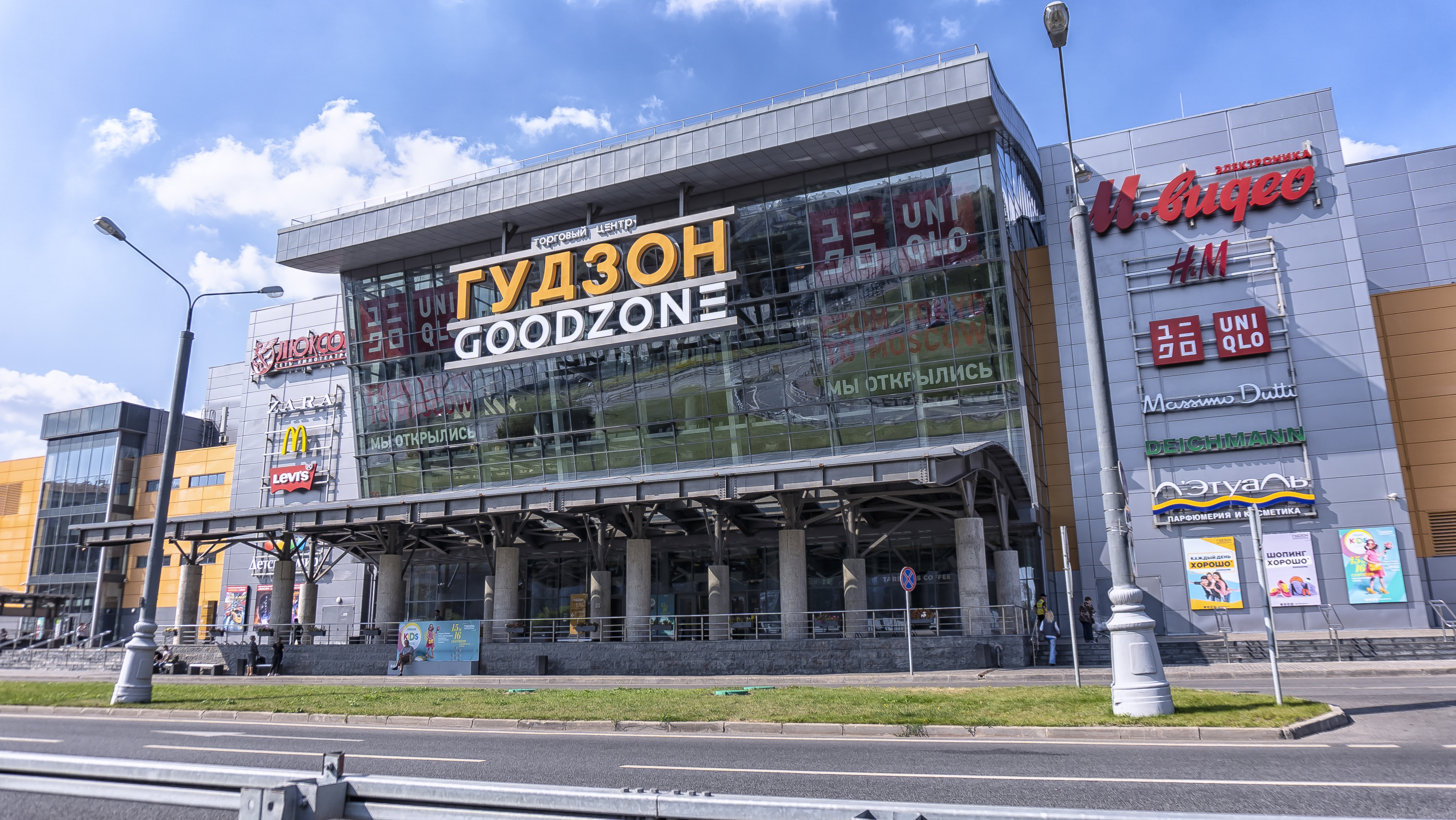
GoodZone

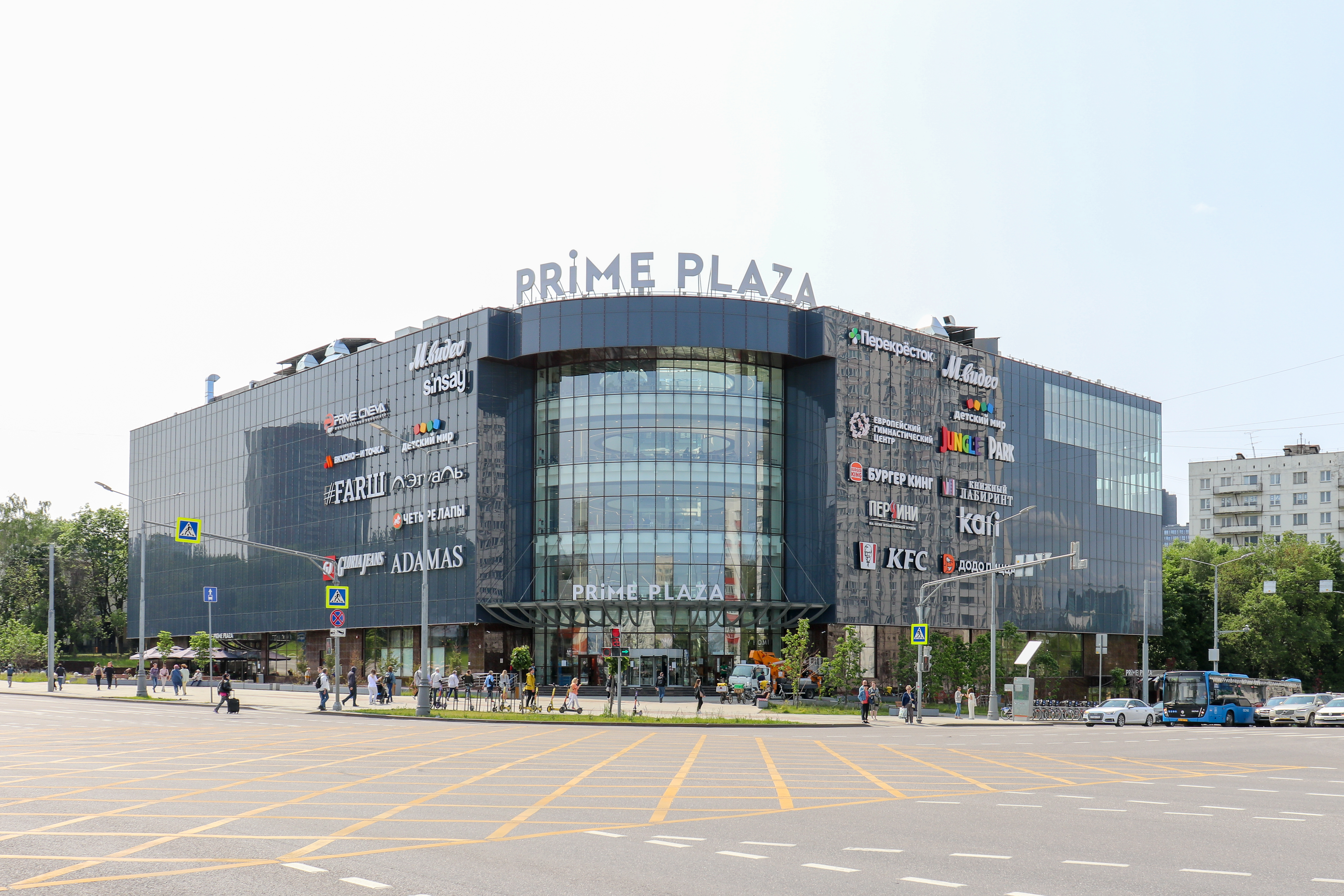
Prime Plaza

Malls in Moscow
Photo	Name	Opened	Owner	Number of stores	Size, m²	Leasable area, m²	coordinates	Mall website
	Vegas Crocus City	2014	Crocus Group	188	285,000	116,713		
	Vegas Kashirskoe	2010	Crocus Group	81	480,000	138,000		
	Kashirskaya Plaza	2018						
	Kashirsky dvor						55.664909°N 37.632201°E	
	Tsentralniy detskiy magazin na Lubyanke (Central Children’s Store)	1956	Hals Development, PJCK	120	73,000	34,392		
	Gorod Lefortovo	2009	Ten, Group of Companies	227	240,000	99,000		
	Gorod Ryazanskiy	2006	Ten, Group of Companies	192	127,850	50,550		
	Rio Dmitrovka	2008	Tashir, Group of Companies	134	250,000	150,000		
	Riviera	2006			298,000			
	Barvikha Luxury Village	2005	Mercury	52	98,000			
	June Mytishchi	2012	Regiony, Group of Companies	156	178,000	75,000		
	Vesna Altufievo	2013	Central Properties and Alto Assets	156	126,000	56,000		
	Gagarinskiy	2010	Auchan	152	200,000	70,000		
	Okeaniya	2016	TPS Nedvizhimost	300	137,000	60,000	55.727971°N 37.475635°E	
	Kuntsevo Plaza	2015	Enka	161	245,000	65,000		
	Rio Sevastopolsky	2005	Tashir, Group of Companies	108	92,000	35,000		
	Schuka	2007	DS Development	170	105,000	42,000		
	Shokolad	2010	Tashir, Group of Companies	250	160,000	78,000		
	Kaleidoscop	2012	BIN, Group of Companies	124	119,079	41,047	55.850479°N 37.444368°E	
	Otrada Trade Park	2011	TP Otrada	122	220,000	75,000		
	Horosho!	2016	TPS Nedvizhimost	250	114,000	50,000		
	Avenue Southwest	2016	Tashir, Group of Companies	138	85,000		55.663005°N 37.481136°E	
	Zelenopark	2015	Development Group-19	120	140,000	110,000		
	Oblaka	2008	Ten, Group of Companies	100	95,600	40,700		
	Viva	2010			32,000			
	Vremena goda	2007	RD Group	130	65,000	32,000		
	Prince Plaza	2008	Tashir Group of Companies	189	115,000	50,000		
	Crocus City Mall	2002	Crocus Group	180	62,000	30,000		
	Afimall City	2001	AFI Development	400	320,000	114,213		
	Atrium shopping mall	2002	Altoon + Porter Architects	150	103,500	40,500		
	Aviapark	2014	Amma Development	333	390,000	230,000		
	Evropeisky Shopping Center	2006	Kievskaya ploshchad, CJSC	336	180,000	63,000		
	GUM	1893	Vostok i Zapad AO, Group of Companies	147	69,000	26,000—36,000		
	Kapitoliy Vernadskogo	2006	Enka	146	114,100	56,674		
	Metropolis	2008	Capital Partners	281	209,000	82,000		
	Moscow Gostiny Dvor	1830	Torgoviy dom «Shater», LLC		81,600	47,400		
	Okhotny Ryad Shopping Center	1997		> 100	62,711			
	Troyka	2008	Immochan	93	144,900	45,700		
	TSUM	1908						
	Tsvetnoy Central Market	2010	Rose Group		36,500	35,000		
	Varshavskiy	2005	Grandice, LLC	78	33,350	16,000		
	Yerevan Plaza	2007	Tashir, Group of Companies	162	38,150	24,000		
	Europolis Rostokino	2009	Immofinanz	>200	240,000	170,000		
	FORT Otradnoe	2002	Immofinanz	94	38,000	25,700		
	Kalita						55.607452°N 37.532257°E	
	Columbus Shopping Center	2015		300	140,000		55.650038°N 37.770093°E	
	Mari	2014			135,000		55.612173°N 37.606892°E	
	Megapolis	2009						
	Outlet Village Belaya Dacha	2012		180				
	Mega Belaya Dacha				303,000			
	MEGA Khimki			214	210,600	175,000		
	MEGA Teply Stan			208	180,500	155,000		
