= Kruizenga Art Museum =

College art museum in Holland, Michigan

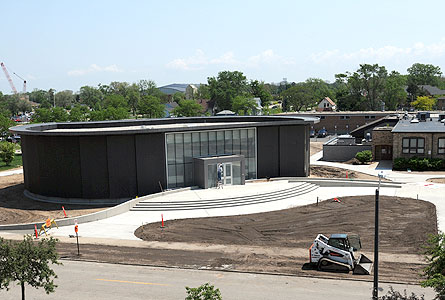
- Site of the Kruizenga Art Museum, mid-construction
- Established: September 1, 2015; 10 years ago
- Location: 271 Columbia Avenue, Holland, Michigan
- Director: Charles Mason
- Public transit access: MAX
- Website: www.hope.edu/arts/kam

The Kruizenga Art Museum (KAM) is a 15,000 square feet (1,400 m^{2}) college art museum located in Holland, Michigan. Situated within the heart of the Hope College campus; the museum was designed to serve as an educational resource for both the campus community and the other colleges and schools in the area. The museum features two galleries, and a classroom for viewing select pieces not on display in the exhibits. The collection housed in the museum consists of more than 1,000 objects representing a variety of traditions but with a particular emphasis on Asian art. The KAM is the first facility in the college's 150-year history built to display its permanent collection of art. Discussed by Papyrus Magazine, Architect Magazine, Architizer, MLive, and more, the museum has gained recognition for its unique interplay between creative visions and practicality.

== Collection ==
The museum’s collection includes approximately 1,000 works of art that have been donated to or purchased by Hope College. Approximately half of the artworks in the collection come from Europe and the Americas, while the other half come from Asia and Africa. Most of the works in the collection date from 1600 to the present and span a broad range of genres and media, from paintings, sculptures and prints to decorative arts and religious objects. Moreover, this blend of diverse artwork reflects Hope's student profile; the first graduating class of Hope College had 6 students, two of whom were Japanese.

While the college has been receiving donations of art, nearly 30 percent of the collection, which includes works by 19th century Dutch artist Hendrik Willem Mesdag and by 20th century Spanish artist Salvador Dalí, are newly acquired pieces. This rapid growth stemmed from a donation by David Kamansky and Gerald Wheaton. Donated to the college in the fall of 2013, the gift includes over 500 pieces of art and an extensive 7,000 art-related book collection. With about 80 percent of the art objects in the Kamanksy-Wheaton gift coming from Asia, spanning centuries and representing multiple cultures.

== Lead donation ==
The Kruizenga Art Museum is named in recognition of a leadership gift from Richard and Margaret Feldmann Kruizenga. Richard who studied at Hope, went on to a long career with Exxon, Inc., retiring as Vice President of Corporate Planning. Richard served on the Hope College Board of Trustees and on the Investment Committee. Margaret also studied at Hope, she taught at college level and was known for her love of the arts and theater. Margaret and Richard were early and enthusiastic supporters of the Hope Summer Repertory Theatre. Margaret died in April 2013. Richard and Margaret’s support for the museum reflects their longtime love for art, sparked at Hope College, and developed during their travels and throughout their lives together. Margaret Kruizenga, asked for a building that would be "unusual" among the red-brick buildings on campus during the early design process.

== Conception ==
=== Architectural design ===
The Kruizenga Art Museum building is the creation of Hope alumnus Matthew Vander Borgh '84, and president of C Concept Design in the Netherlands. Donald Battjes '68, former Chief of Operations and Facility Planning at the Los Angeles County Museum of Art, provided additional input on the building’s design and operational features. At the opening gala, he stated that the interior gives "a raw, natural look" in order for the aesthetically pleasing practicality of displaying artwork to be fulfilled.

The building comprises approximately 15,000 square feet of total space. The major public spaces of the museum include two art exhibition galleries, a reception lobby and classroom.

In accordance with the wishes of the lead donors, the building was designed to stand out from other buildings on the Hope campus. The distinctive "double lung" shape was partly inspired by the shape of a traditional artist’s palette and is also homage to the Guggenheim Museum in New York, one of the first Modernist museum buildings. The façade of the building features a glass front with 700-pound Cambrian black granite panels sweeping around the sides in a dramatic saw-tooth pattern; according to Stone Ideas, this is an "eye-catcher" not only for its functional practicality, but also for its unique design. The interior of the building features polished concrete floors, segmented walls and open ceilings that complement its modernist exterior and provide a visually dynamic environment for displaying art.
