= C Concept Design =

Netherlands-based architecture firm

C Concept Design BV
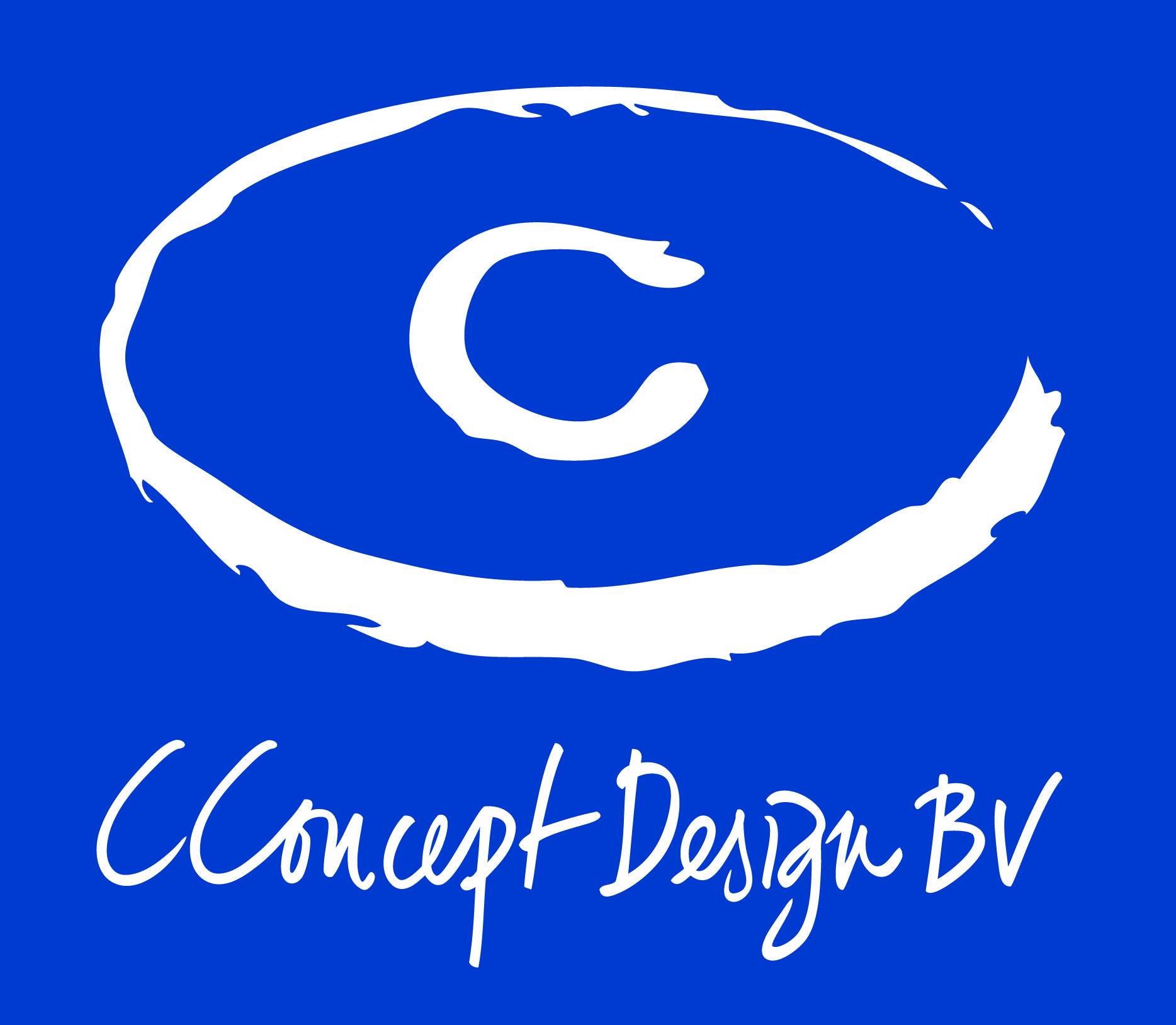
- C Concept Design B.V.
- Company type: bv
- Industry: Architecture, Master Planning, Interior design
- Founded: The Hague, Netherlands (2002)
- Founder: Matthew VanderBorgh
- Headquarters: The Hague, Netherlands 52°6′6″N 4°21′15″E
- Area served: North America; Europe; Africa; Middle East
- Key people: Matthew VanderBorgh; Director; Inna Markova; Senior Architect / General Manager CCD LLC
- Services: Architecture; Master planning; Interior design
- Owner: Matthew VanderBorgh
- Website: www.ccdx.nl

C Concept Design is an international architecture firm based in The Hague, Netherlands, founded by American architect Matthew VanderBorgh in 2002. C Concept Design focuses on sustainable practices, master-planning and concept design. Matthew VanderBorgh earned his bachelor's degree from Hope College in 1984. He would later receive a Masters Diploma of Architecture from Harvard University Graduate School of Design. C Concept Design has focused on providing urban and architectural visions for the programming, concept and design development of new buildings. Prior to C Concept Design, VanderBorgh worked as an architectural designer on the prize winning Gateway Transit Center in Los Angeles in 1997.

The team is an internationally oriented design practice with architects, product designers, urban designers, and interior designers from several countries including the United States of America, the Netherlands, Russia, Korea and Italy. Since 2002, C Concept Design has attracted an international clientele and has many collaborations with companies such as Renaissance Construction/Ballast Nedam, Heijmans, Globus, Multi Development, Etam Group, Tripos and many more. Many of the firm's commissions have received significant appreciation from the architectural community. One notable example is the company's realized design of the Kruizenga Art Museum on the Hope College campus.

On 24 May 2014 one of C Concept Designs largest projects, Les Terrasses du Port, opened in Marseilles, France. The shopping center has been recognised with multiple awards including Best Retail Urban Project at MAPIC 2014 and Création de Centre Commercial at the Procos Awards 2015, as well as receiving an Excellent rating from BREEAM.

== Publications ==
On 12 March 2019, Dutch news site, AD.nl published an article about the ongoing project of Hart van Zuid's Zuidplein Winkelcentrum in Rotterdam, the Netherlands and how it will transform the future of the neighborhood.

AD.nl published an article on 3 April 2019 about developing project, Delta21, which is an artificial island that will be producing its own sustainable energy located in South Holland. On 7 March 2019, Dutch science publication, TechniekNL published an article about the sustainable and innovative practices about Delta21.

On 6 April 2015, The Moscow Times published an article about the growth of shopping malls in Russia and credits Columbus as being one of the leaders in this boom.

Throughout 2015, Hope College's Kruizenga Art Museum has been published and discussed in several online publications including World Architecture News, Papyrus Magazine, Architect Magazine, Architizer, MLive, HyperAllergic, and Lighting Magazine. On 10 September 2015, Nick Myall from World Architecture News published an article of Kruizenga Art museum called "A Museum Full of Hope". The museum has become recognized for its creative design in the heart of the campus of Holland, Michigan in the United States. On 9 April 2019, Hope College Kruizenga Art Museum will feature Rembrandt etchings in their spring exhibition.

French journalist, Corinne Boyer from La Croix published, "Marseille se convertit au commerce XXL" on 21 July 2014 about the award-winning project, Les Terrases du Port.

== Awards ==
Columbus Shopping Center (Moscow, Russia) – Best Very Large Shopping Centre - CRE Awards 2016

Vesna Shopping Centre Port (Altufievo, Russia) – Best Large Shopping Centre - CRE Awards 2015

Les Terrasses du Port (Marseille, France) – Best Retail Urban Project - Mapic Awards 2014

Gran Sasso Shopping Center (Teramo, Italy) – ICSC European Shopping Centre Award 2009

Kozzy Shopping Centre (Istanbul, Turkey) – ICSC European Award 2011 for Best New Shopping Centre Under 50,000 m2

Gran Shopping Mongolfiera (Molfetta, Italy) – CNCC Italy Award 2010.

== Notable works ==
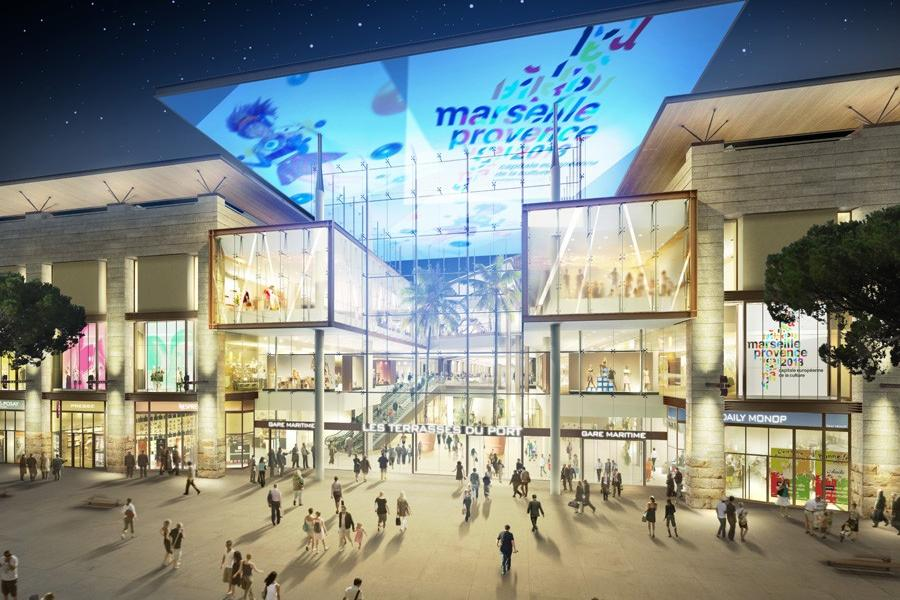
Main Entrance of Les Terrasses du Port in Marseille, France

Les Terrasses du Port (in French) (Marseille, France) – awarded Best Retail Urban Project by Mapic Awards 2014.

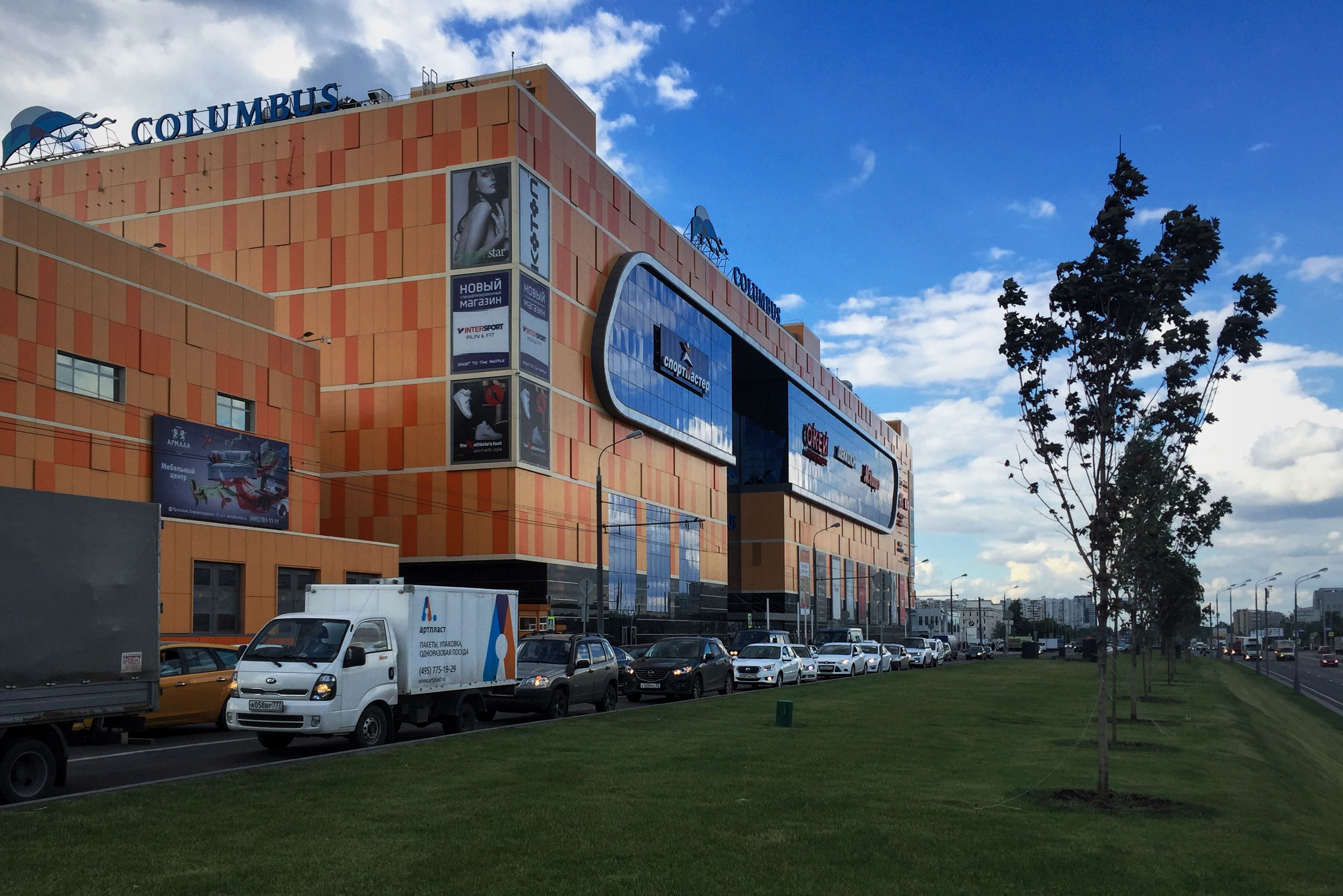
Columbus Shopping Mall in Moscow, Russia

Columbus Shopping Center (Moscow, Russia) – Five-level retail and entertainment complex of 140,000 m^{2}. In 2016 the shopping centre won the CRE award for Best Very Large Shopping Centre.

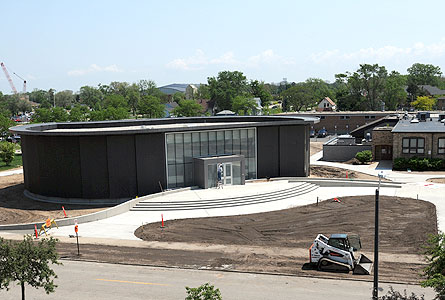
Kruizenga Art Museum, under construction in 2014

Hope College Art Museum (Holland, US) – Noble concept of 15,000 ft^{2} designed to exhibit permanent art collection of Hope College and provide the students with flexible and inspiring space for studies of literature, art and languages.

Zanzibar Passenger and RoRo Ferry Terminal Project (Zanzibar, Tanzania) – Ferry terminal designed by C Concept as the architectural lead for ZF Devco’s project, created to improve passenger circulation and strengthen the waterfront connection.

University Medical Center Utrecht (Utrecht, the Netherlands) – Designed the master plan that both inspires a campus atmosphere and solves logistical challenges for those using the hospital.

Rotterdam The Hague Airport (Rotterdam, the Netherlands) – An updated master plan for the redevelopment and expansion for the airport and the expansion includes a new arrivals terminal, grade A offices, a high end hotel, restaurants with terraces, and an upgraded traffic system.

Gran Sasso Shopping Center (Teramo, Italy) – 36,000 m^{2} enclosed shopping center and stadium development. The complex was awarded with the prestigious ICSC European Shopping Centre Award in 2009.

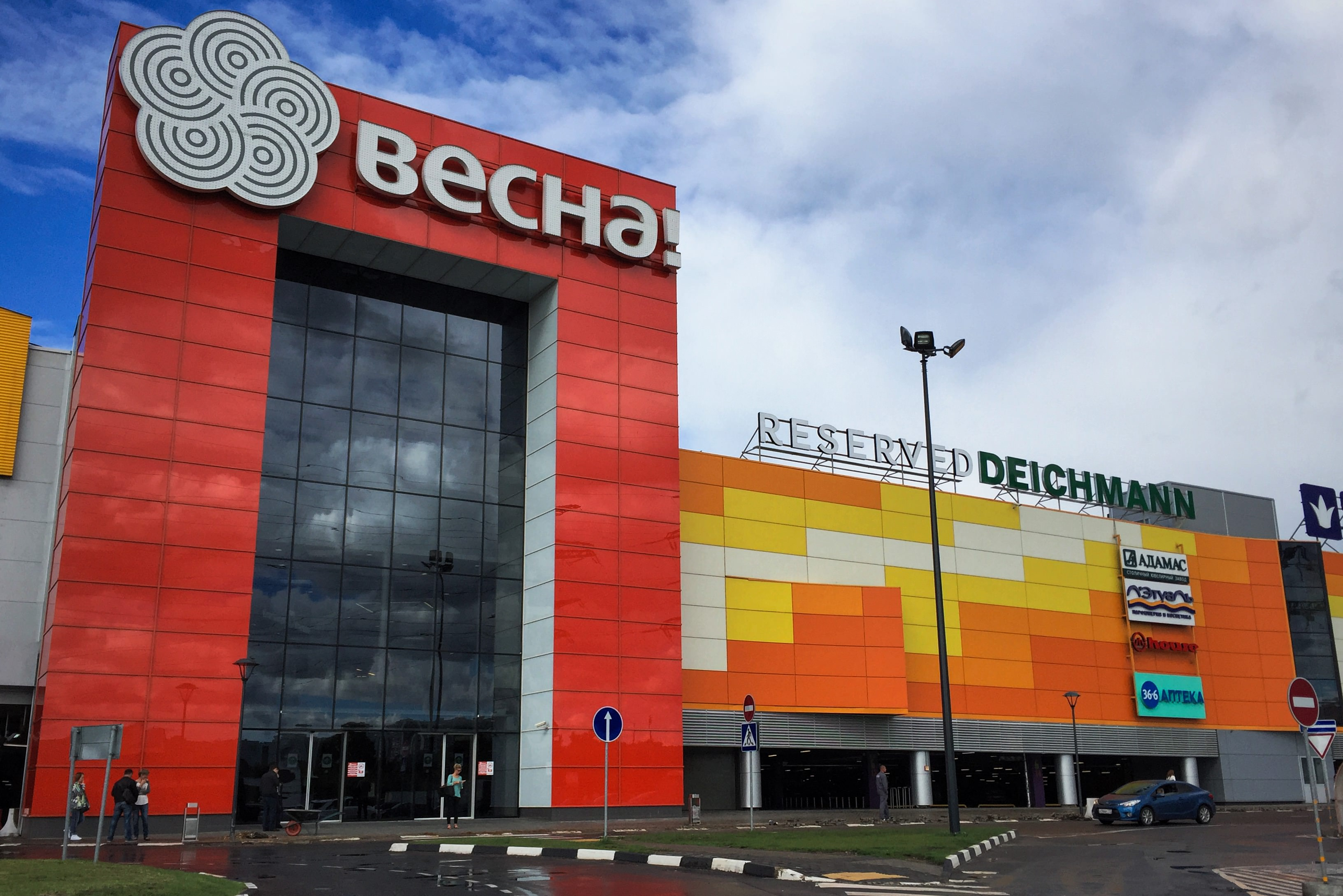
Vesna Shopping Centre in Moscow, Russia

Vesna Shopping Centre in the Altufyevsky District (Moscow, Russia) – 80,000 m^{2} shopping mall in the suburbs of Moscow, in 2015, received the CRE Award for Best Large Shopping Centre.

Aura Shopping Center (Yaroslavl, Russia) – 120,000 m^{2} shopping center with four levels of shops and restaurants.

Gran Shopping Mongolfiera (Molfetta, Italy) – Award-winning single-lever shopping center of 42,000 m^{2} in Molfetta, Italy, that includes a 7,000 m^{2} Ipercoop hypermarket.

Riviera (Moscow, Russia) – Landscaping and concept design for a shopping center with a riverfront park.

Riverside (Voronezh, Russia) – 555-hectare site along the Voronezh River will be programmed with hotels, an amusement park and an exposition hall.

Aura (Novosibirsk, Russia) – Multi-level enclosed shopping and leisure center that offers over 200 stores. At 120,000 m^{2} it is the largest retail center in Siberia.

Zenata (Zenata, Morocco) – Designed masterplan for Africa's first Eco city, Zenata with an emphasis on urbanization and sustainability.

Tanzanite Mall (Dar es Salaam, Tanzania) – The 80.000 m^{2} GLA retail centre with offices, apartments and an under building parking facility for 2,500 cars. The Tanzanite Mall is the first international standard mall in Tanzania.

Istanbul Seaport (Istanbul, Turkey) – Largest waterfront development creating public, commercial and residential spaces; that include a port terminal, which is expected to serve over 8 million passengers a year.
