= Zanzibar Passenger and RoRo Ferry Terminal Project =

Development project in Zanzibar

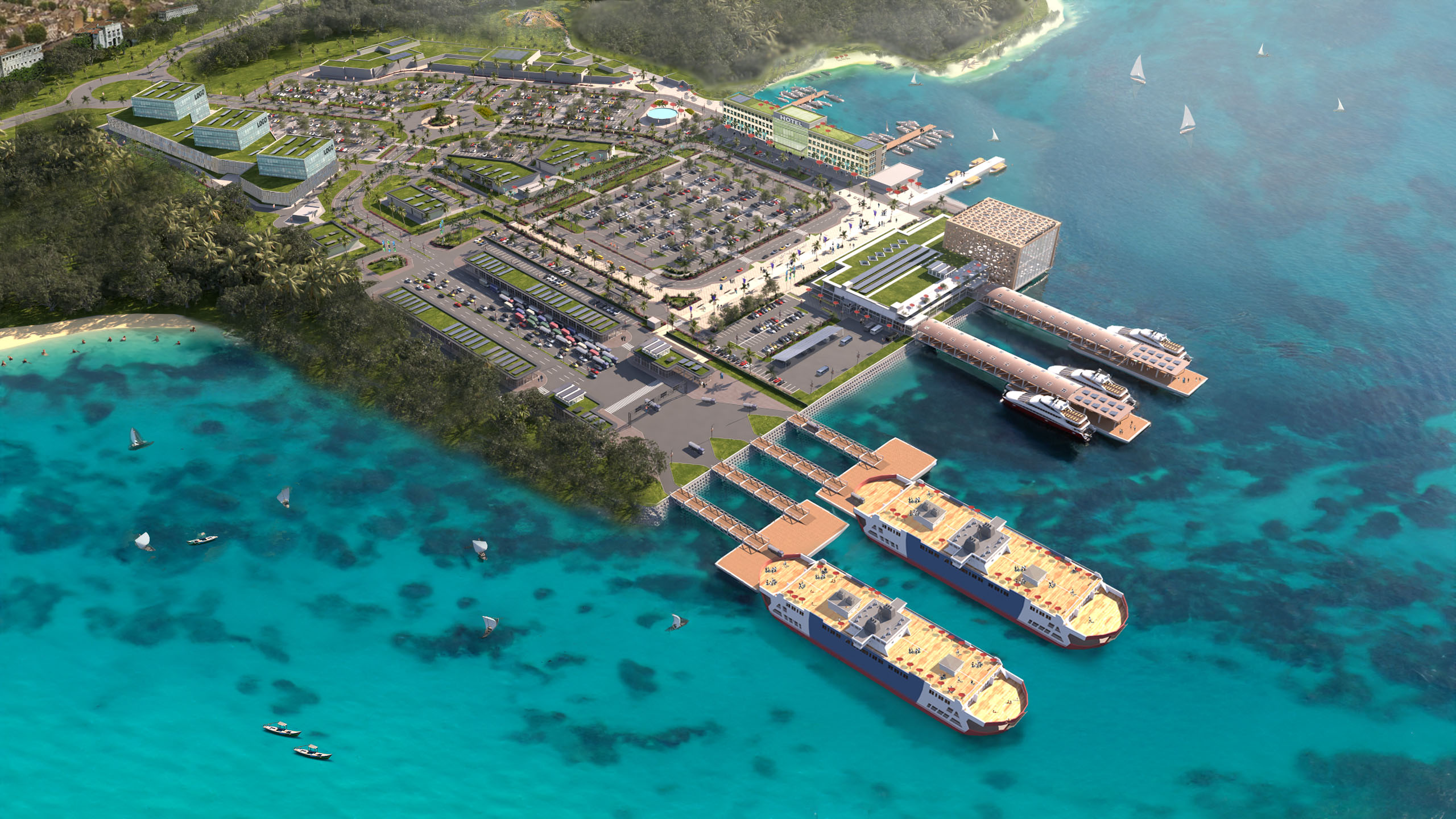
- Rendering of the planned terminal, Zanzibar

General information
- Type: Passenger and RoRo ferry terminal
- Location: Maruhubi (Mpigaduri), Unguja, Zanzibar, Tanzania
- Groundbreaking: November 2024
- Completed: 2027 (estimated)
- Cost: US$250 million (Phase A)
- Owner: Zanzibar Ports Corporation

Technical details
- Size: 29 Ha

Design and construction
- Developer: Zanzibar Ferry Development Company (ZF Devco b.v.)

Other information
- Seating capacity: 3 million passengers per year

The Zanzibar Passenger and RoRo Ferry Terminal Project (also known as the Maruhubi Ferry Terminal Project) is a public–private partnership (PPP) infrastructure development in Maruhubi (Mpigaduri), on Unguja Island, Zanzibar, Tanzania. The project is led by the Zanzibar Ferry Development Company (ZF Devco b.v.) in partnership with the Revolutionary Government of Zanzibar through the Zanzibar Ports Corporation. It is part of the government's wider programme to modernise maritime transport and improve connectivity between Zanzibar and mainland Tanzania.

== Background ==
The government allocated approximately US$250 million for a new passenger port at Maruhubi to relieve the strain at Malindi and comply with international standards.

Authorities expect that by 2027 all passenger operations currently handled by Malindi will be relocated to the new terminal in Maruhubi.

== Design, Development and Consortium ==
The project is being developed under a public–private partnership (PPP). In early 2024, the Zanzibar Ports Corporation signed a concession agreement with ZF Devco b.v., a consortium of Dutch and Tanzanian firms, to build, finance, design, and operate the new facility. Clyde & Co provided legal advisory services for the agreement.

The design and planning consortium includes C Concept Design b.v., Rebel, Delta Marine Consultants, OrangeGaia, Borgh Go, CDR, MultiStruct, Songoro Marine Transport, and Kengo TZ. The masterplan features a passenger terminal, RoRo (roll-on/roll-off) vehicle terminal, community services, hotel and hospitality spaces, exhibition and retail components. Sustainability features such as solar energy, water retention, and rainwater collection are integrated into the plan.

The Jane Goodall Institute (JGI) in Zanzibar assisted on the project's mangrove relocation and conservation.

== Project Scope and Phases ==
The development site covers approximately 29 hectares, including 19 hectares of reclaimed land, located north of Stone Town in Maruhubi.

Phase A (Phase A.1, Phase A.2 and Phase A.3) focuses on the core marine infrastructure: the passenger ferry terminal (approx. 22,000 m²), the RoRo terminal (approx. 4,000 m²), and community facilities. Later phases are expected to add a logistics centre, exhibition spaces, offices, hotels, retail, and possibly facilities for water taxis and seaplanes.

Total investment across all phases is estimated between US$350 million and US$400 million, with Phase A valued at around US$250 million.

== Construction ==
Construction officially began in November 2024 with the start of Phase A.1.

The total construction period is projected at 36 months, with completion expected by 2027.

== Impact ==
The terminal is expected to reduce congestion at Malindi Port, improve passenger safety, and strengthen Zanzibar's position as a maritime hub in the western Indian Ocean. It is also seen as an important step in advancing the islands' Blue Economy strategy by increasing trade and tourism capacity.

Challenges identified in local and international reporting include the need for upgraded transport links, customs facilities, and environmental safeguards for nearby mangrove ecosystems.

== Related Projects ==
The Maruhubi terminal is part of a broader programme of port expansion and modernisation in Zanzibar. Other initiatives include the enhancement of Mangapwani Port, expansion of Fumba Container Terminal, and the development of new cargo handling facilities.
