= Aura Mall, Novosibirsk =

Aura
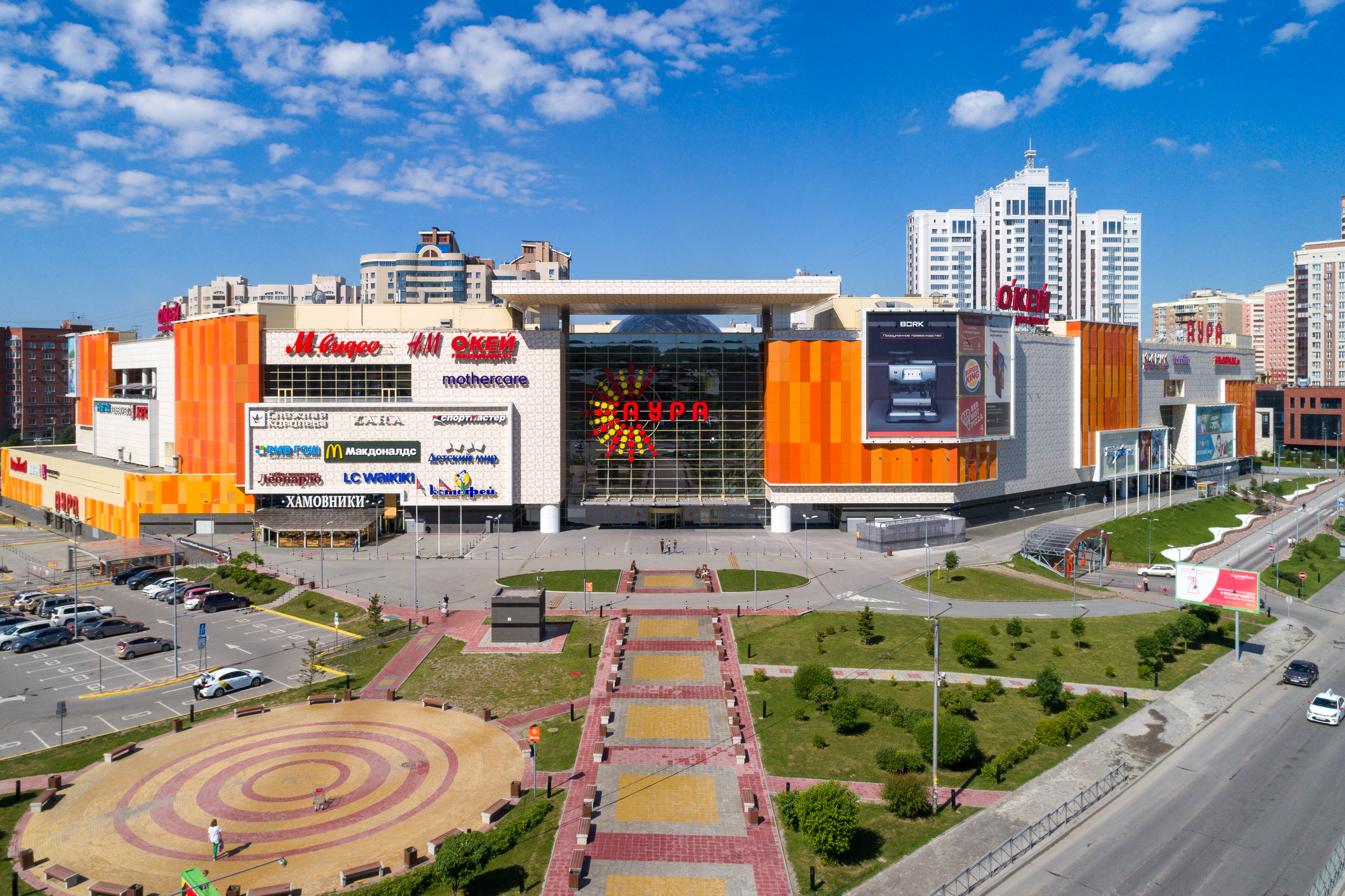
- Location: Novosibirsk, Russia
- Coordinates: 55.02878922416545°N 82.93686728343792°E
- Opened: 2011
- Website: Official website

The Aura is a shopping and leisure center in Tsentralny District of Novosibirsk, Russia. It was opened in 2011.

== History ==
The shopping complex was opened on March 18, 2011. Initially, it was owned by Renaissance Development.

In 2013, Rosevrodevelopment bought Aura for 195.5 million euros. Praedium Investment Capital valued the purchase at $784 million.

== Description ==
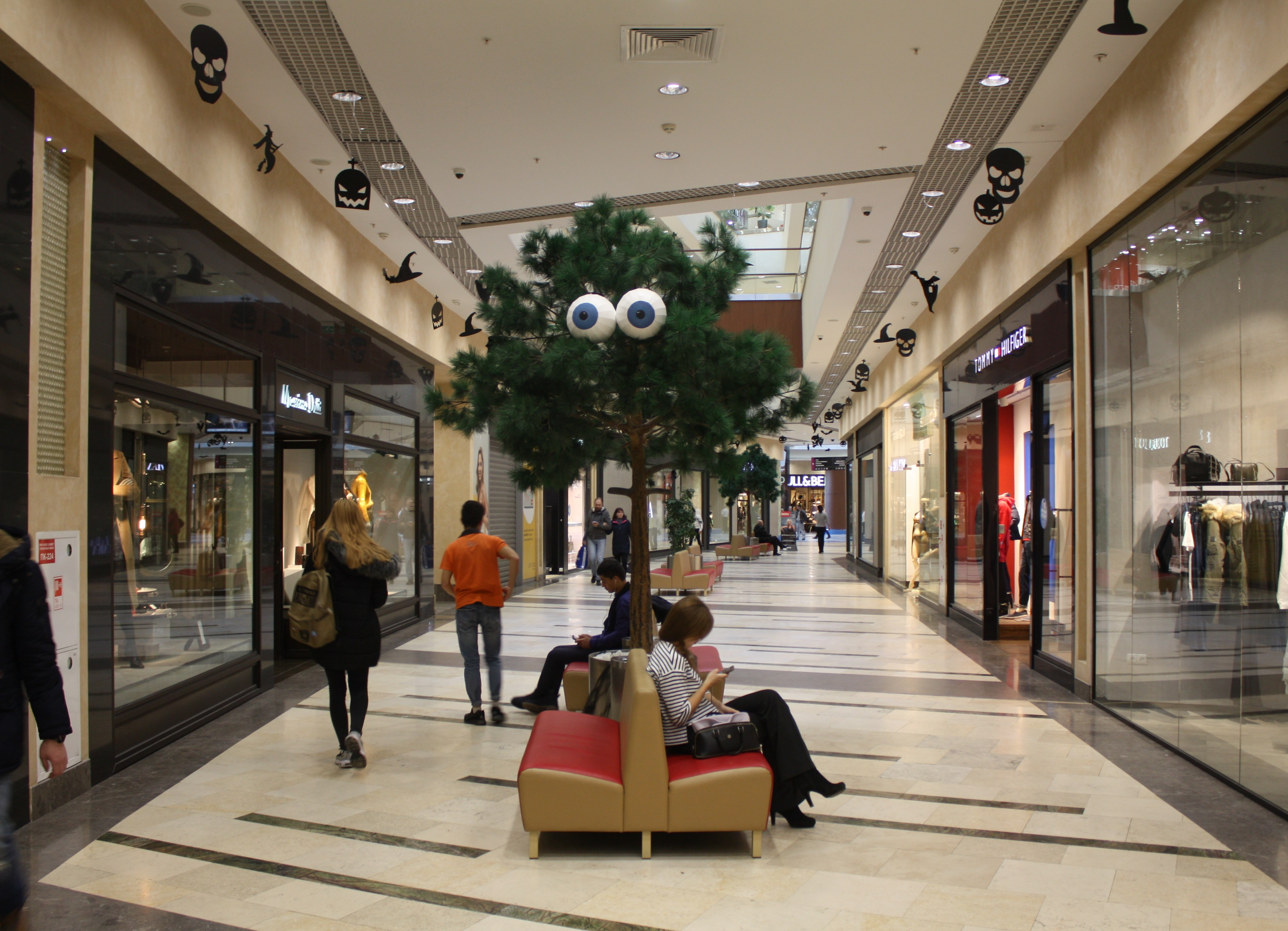

The mall is located at the intersection of Voyennaya and Ippodromskaya streets. Its total area is 150,000 square meters.

The shopping center consists of two underground floors and four above ground.

The underground floors are occupied by car parking and several trade premises.

The ground floor is occupied by the O'Key Hypermarket, clothing stores: Zara, Berchka, H&M, Tommy Hilfiger, Levi's, Calzedonia etc.

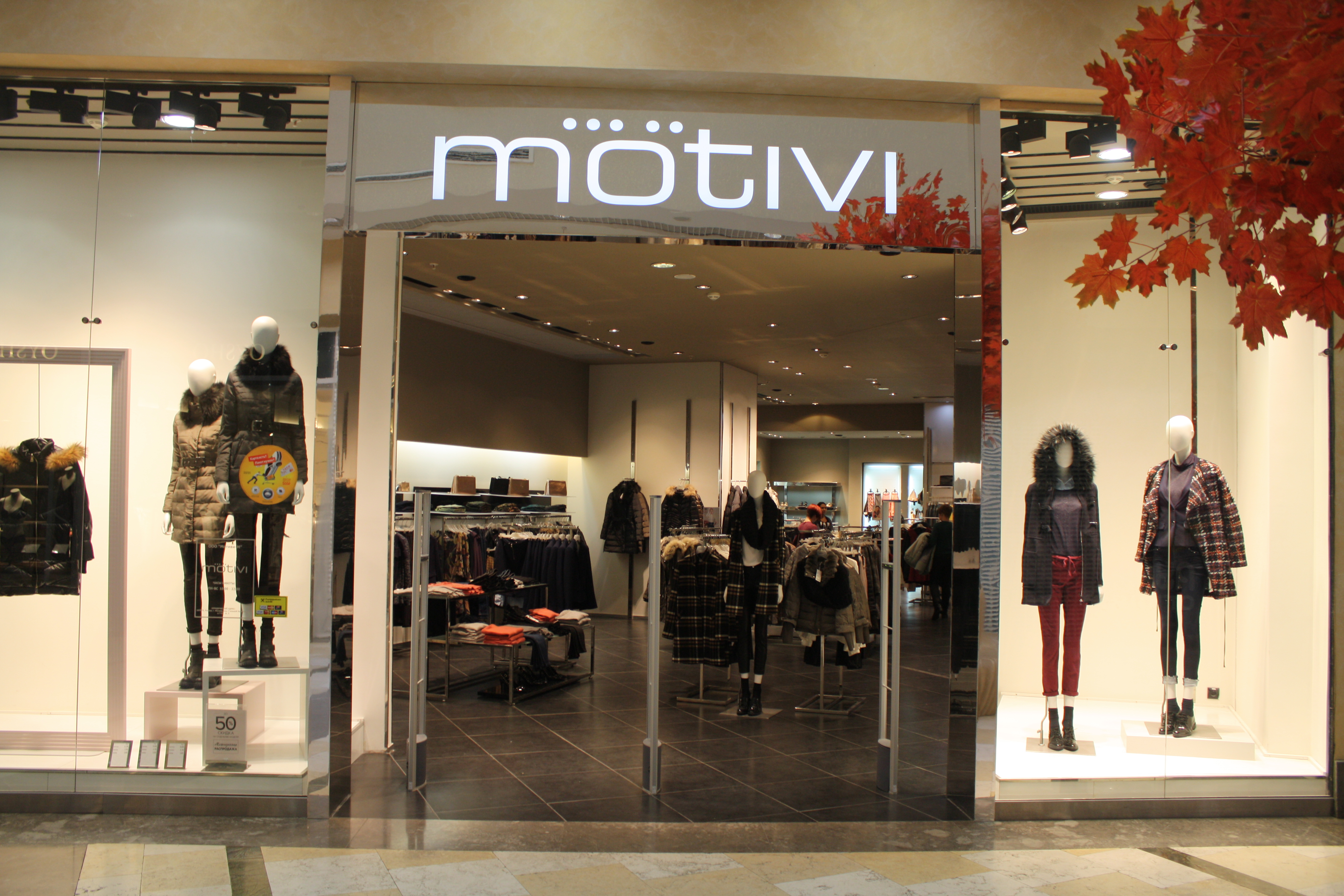

The second floor: New Yorker, Sinar, Tom Tailor and other clothing stores.

The main tenant of the third floor, before its closure in August 2018, was the MediaMarkt. It is occupied by ECCO, Nike, children's shops and others.

The fourth floor is occupied by a food court (Burger King, McDonald's, KFC etc), cinema, bookshop, children's entertainment centers etc.

== Gallery ==
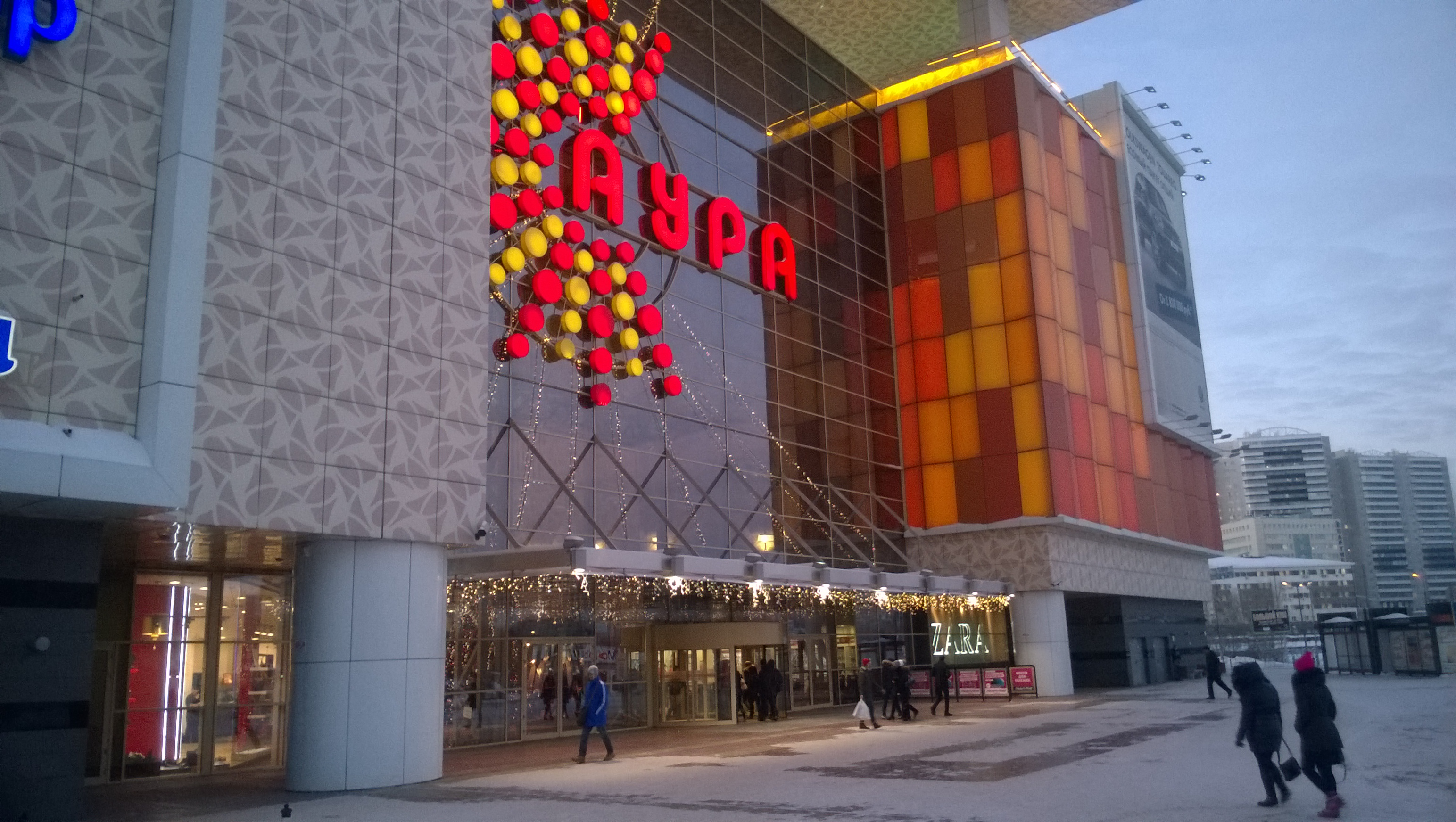

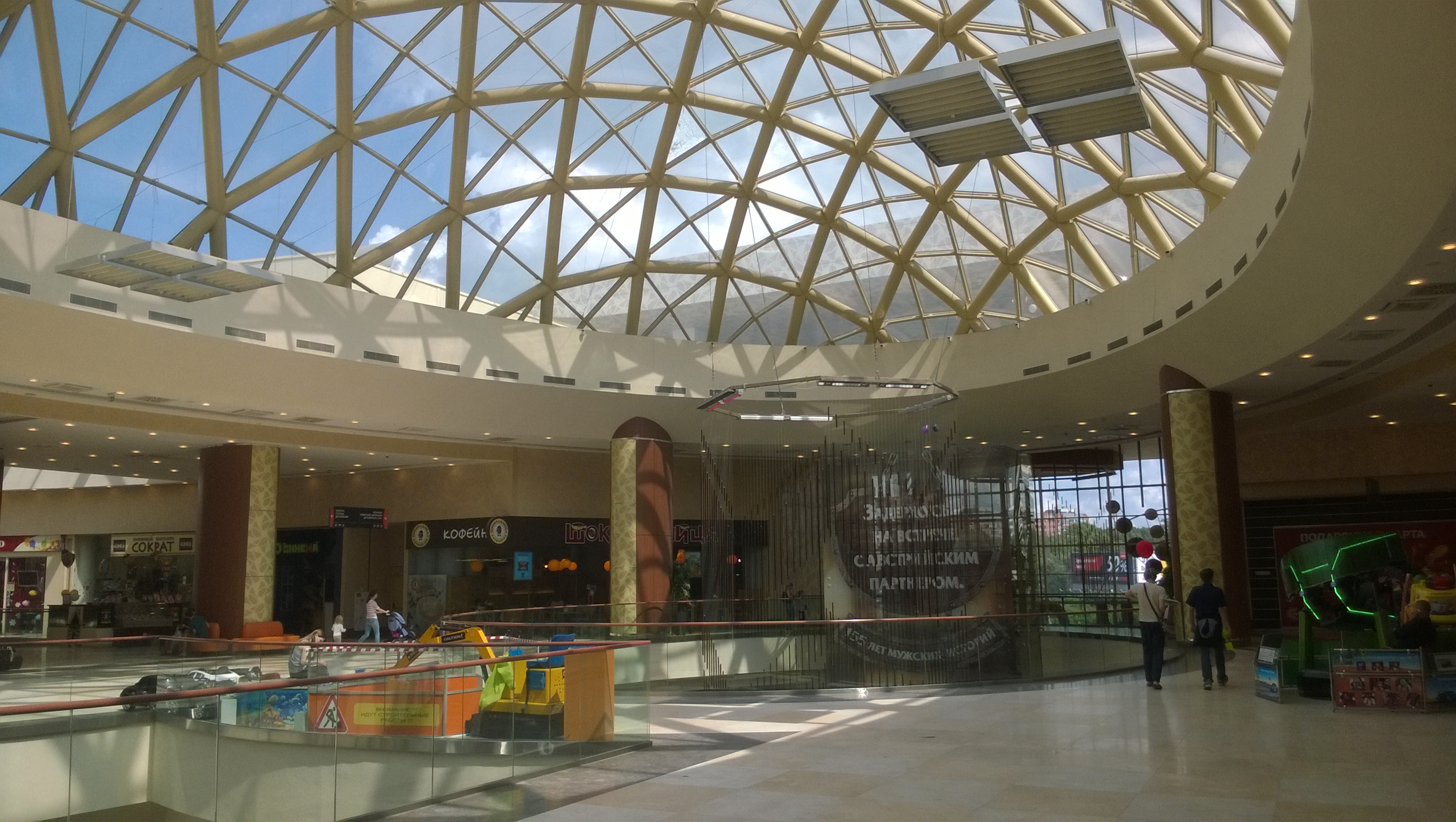

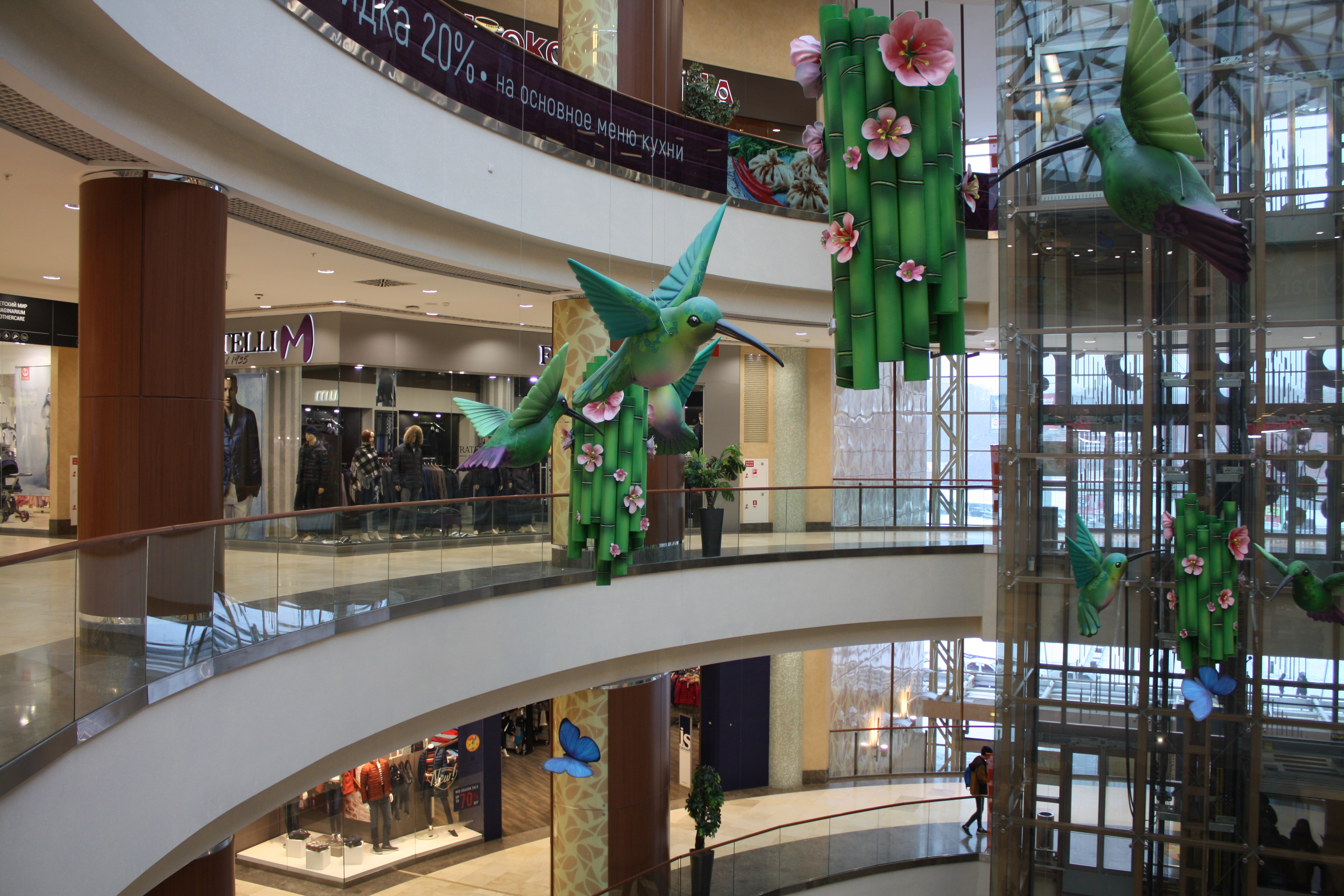

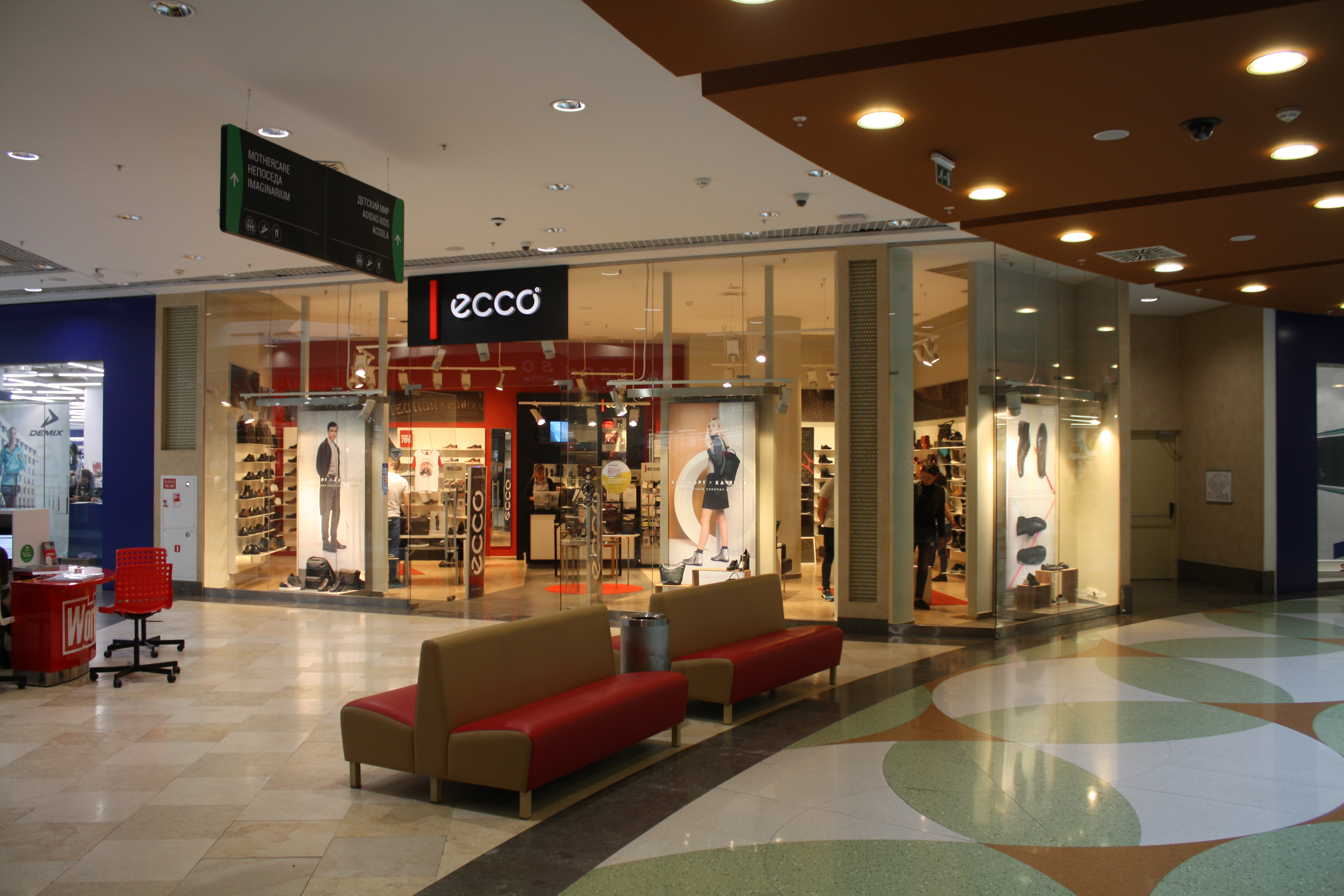

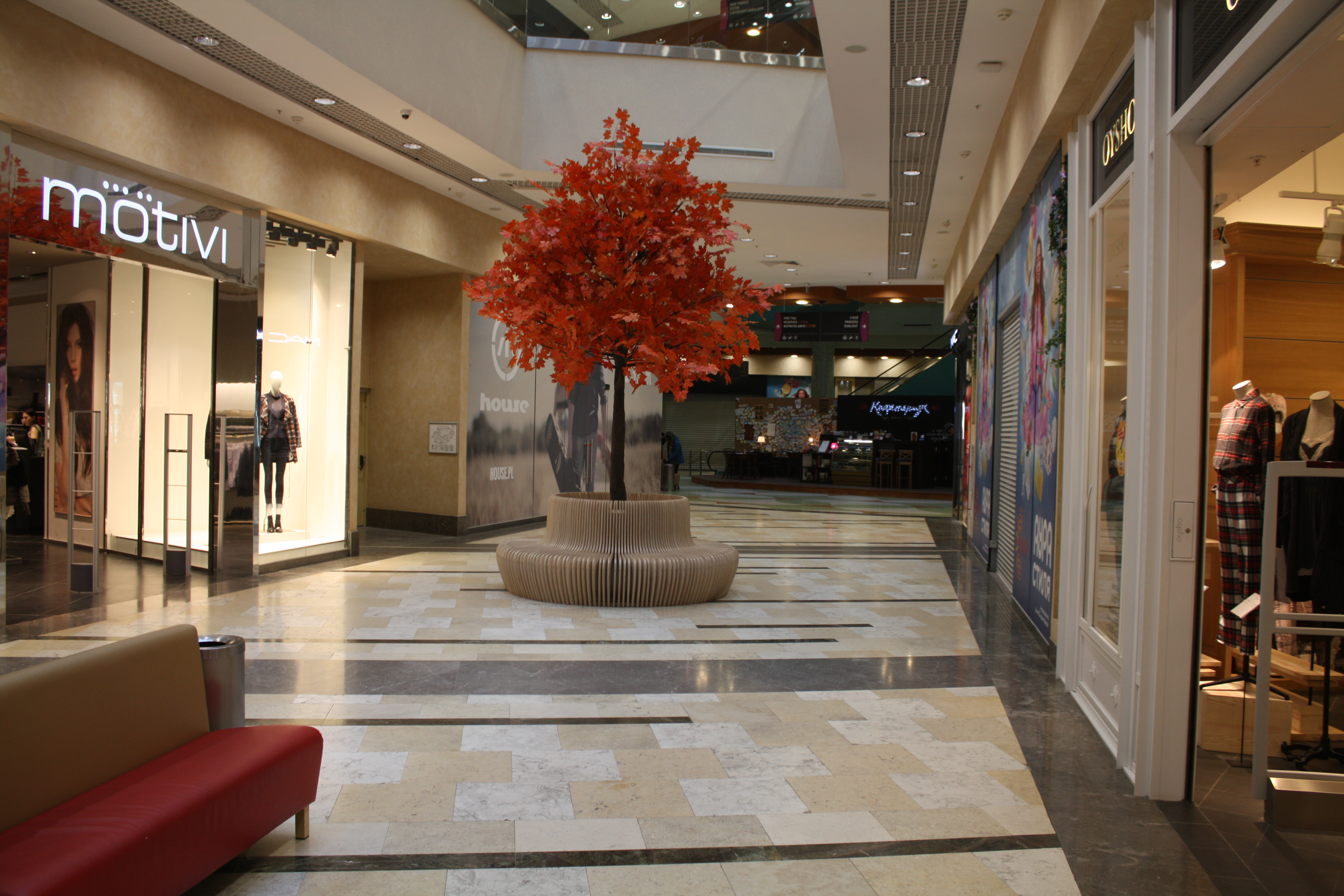

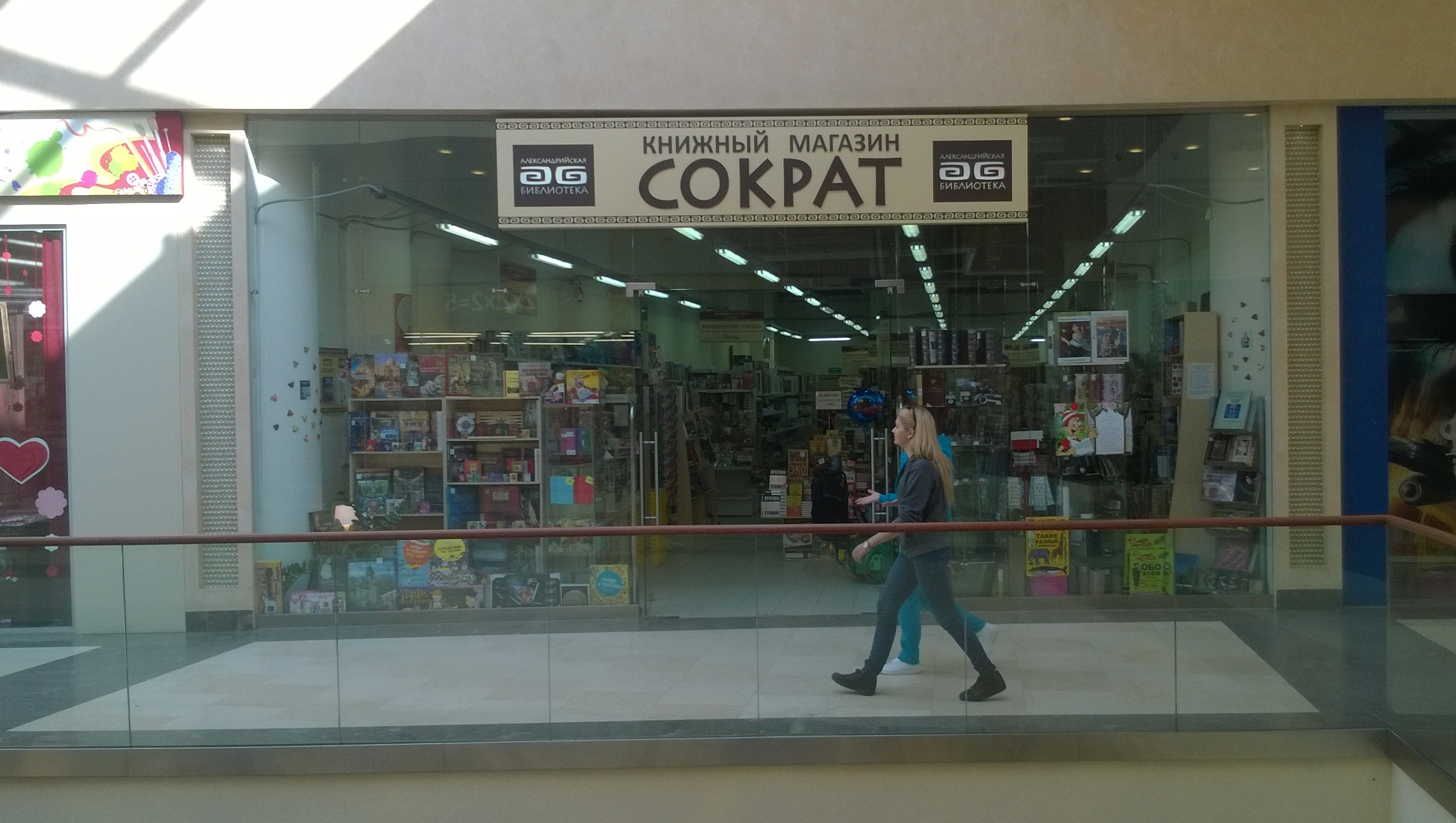
