= Columbus Shopping Center =

Columbus
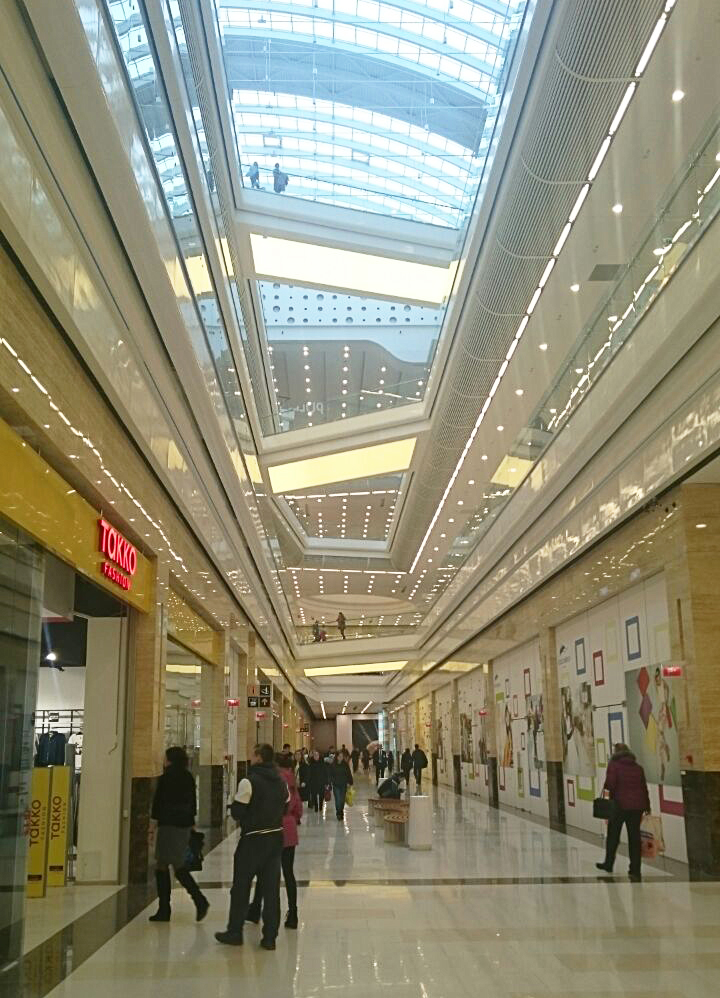
- Interior of Columbus Shopping Center
- Location: Southern Administrative District
- Coordinates: 55°36′44″N 37°36′24″E
- Address: 140 Varshavskoye highway
- Owner: LLC MIRS
- Architect: C Concept Design
- Num. of stores: 300 Shops and 25 Restaurants
- Floor area: 140,000 square metres (1,506,947 ft^{2})
- Floors: 5
- Parking: 2,600
- Public transit: Prazhskaya Metro Station Bus Stop Prazhskaya (147, 147к, 160, 225, 674, 675, 708)

Columbus is a shopping center located in Moscow City center, within the Moscow Ring Road.

== History ==
The center was developed by the LLC MIRS group along the Varshavskoe Shosse highway and above the Prazhskaya Metro Station. Columbus has a gross leasable area of 140,000 square meters and a catchment area of 3 million people between the city center to the north and the residential area of New Moscow to the south. The supermall was mentioned in Europe's top 10 malls of 2015. The center opened to the public in 2000-s

A second, bigger building opened in spring of 2015 and has a retail floor area of 140,000 m^{2}. The opening of Columbus second building will see Moscow move from 6th place to 5th place in Russian cities based on retail space per capita.

The architect for the second building project was C Concept Design in the Netherlands. The design concept for the project was a super regional mall with a primary focus on the leisure and entertainment component including a 15 screen Kinomax (the second largest in Russia and has an IMAX theater), an ice rink and children's zone. The center contains a "deluxe" retail floor with two level shops and 9.5m high shop fronts. The general contractor for the project was Renaissance Construction and Cushman & Wakefield were the exclusive consultant.

== Shops ==
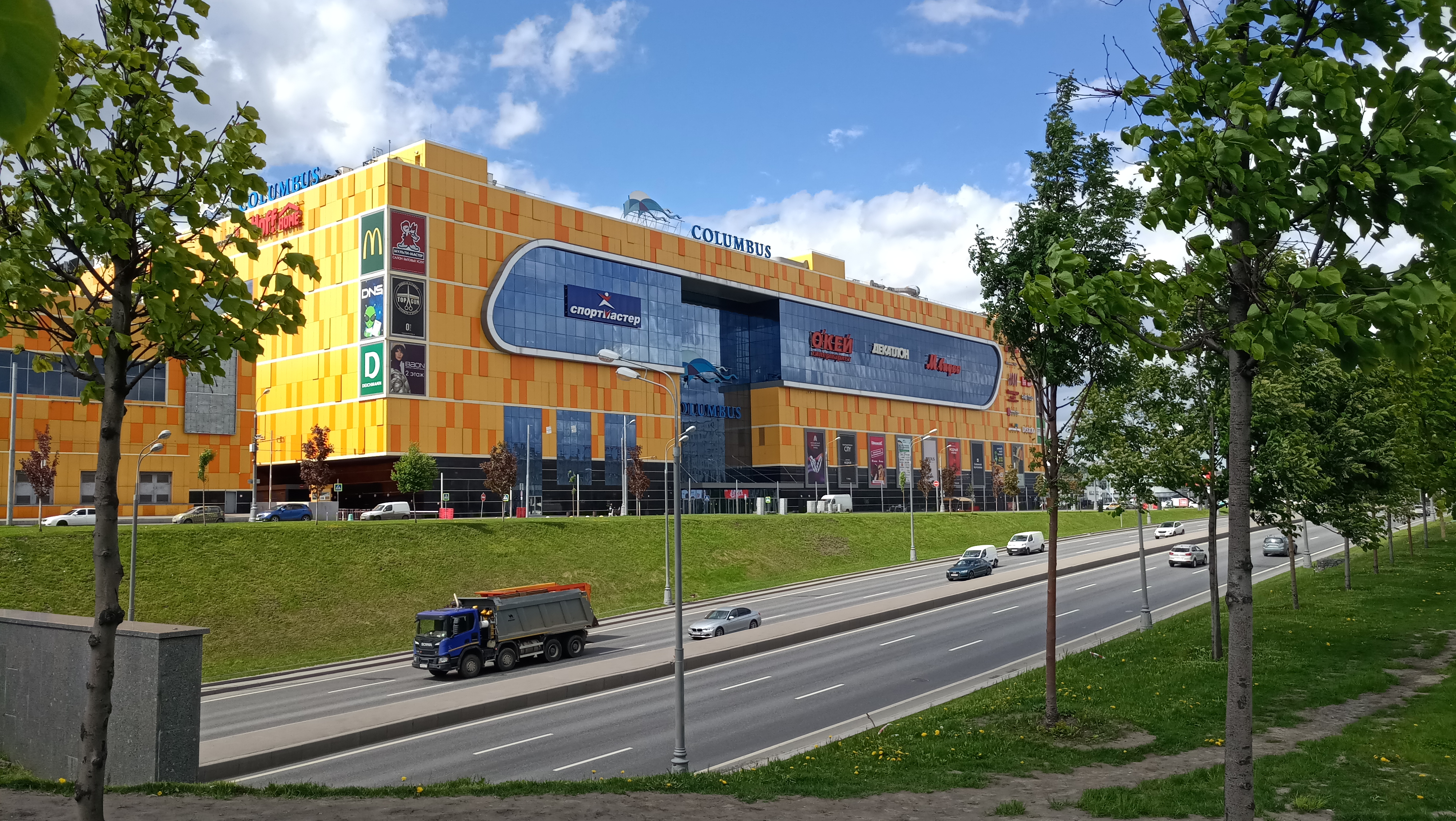
Columbus Shopping Center in Moscow (2020)

The Columbus Shopping Mall has 300 stores and 25 restaurants. The first Superdry store in Russia will be located in Columbus.

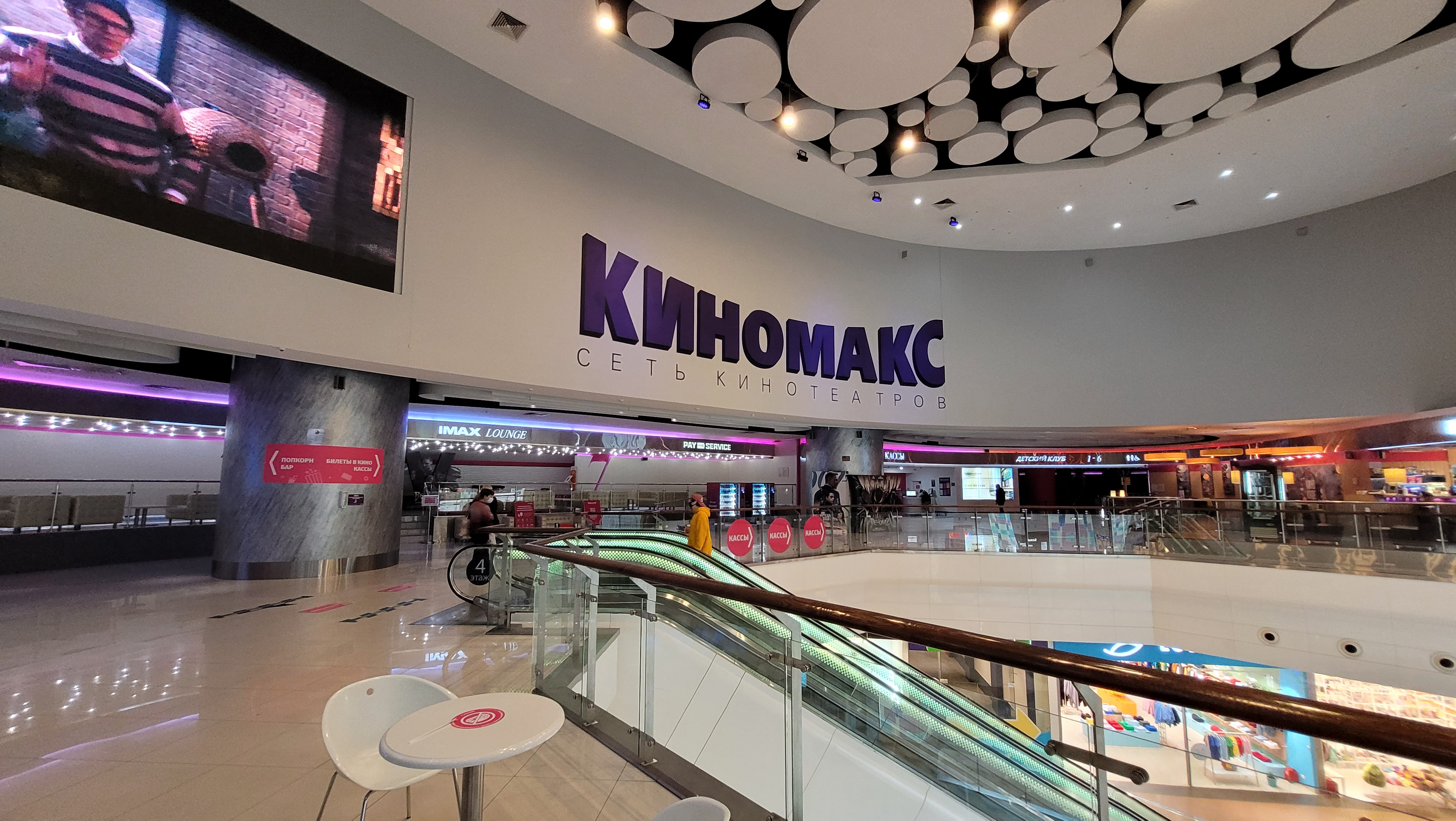
Lobby of cinema in shopping mall (2021)

The following stores are located at the mall: O'KEY; MVideo; Kinomax; Decathlon; Zara; Uniqlo; Reserved; Snow Queen; Lady & Gentleman; Karen Miller; Coast; Warehouse; Fred Perry; Adidas Originals; Terranova; Calliope; BHS; Adidas Brand Center; Nike; Reebok; O'Stin; Sportmaster; Puma; Mango; Funky Town; Hamleys; Detsky Mir; Deti; Mothercare; Prenatal; Chicco; ELC; Imaginarium; Hollister; Furla; Nine West; Forever 21; Takko Fashion; Acoola; McDonald's; DEICHMANN and others.
