= Petrovsky Park (Moscow Metro) =

Moscow Metro station

Petrovsky Park Петровский Парк
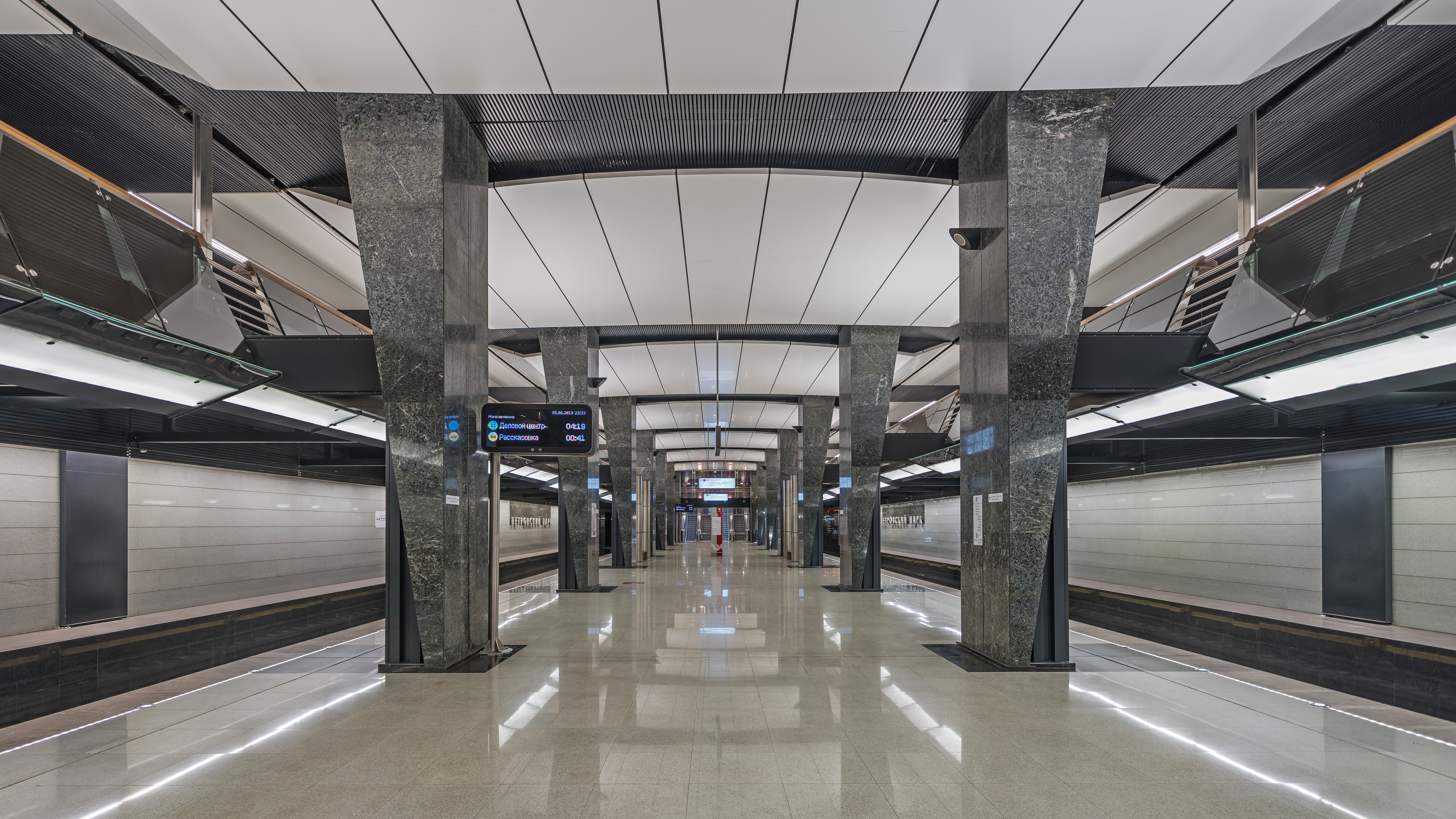

General information
- Location: Aeroport District, Northern Administrative Okrug; Moscow; Russia
- Coordinates: 55.7925°N 37.5578°E
- System: Moscow Metro station
- Owner: Moskovsky Metropoliten
- Line: Bolshaya Koltsevaya line
- Platforms: 1 island platform
- Tracks: 2

Construction
- Structure type: Shallow column station
- Depth: 25 metres (82 ft)
- Platform levels: 1

History
- Opened: 26 February 2018

Services
| Preceding station | Moscow Metro | Following station |
|---|---|---|
| CSKA anticlockwise / outer | Bolshaya Koltsevaya line | Savyolovskaya clockwise / inner |
| Aeroport towards Khovrino | Zamoskvoretskaya line transfer at Dinamo | Belorusskaya towards Alma-Atinskaya |
Route map
Bolshaya Koltsevaya line
Location
- Location within Moscow Metro

Petrovsky Park (Russian: Петровский парк) is a station on the Bolshaya Koltsevaya line of the Moscow Metro. It served the eastern terminus of the line until 30 December 2018, when the extension of Bolshaya Koltsevaya to Savyolovskaya opened. It opened on 26 February 2018 as one of five initial stations on the new line. Petrovsky Park allows transfers to Dinamo Station on the Zamoskvoretskaya line since 29 December 2020.

== Location ==
It is in the Aeroport District of Moscow near Petrovsky Park and Petrovsky Palace in northern Moscow. It is adjacent to VTB Arena, which is the home stadium of FC Dynamo Moscow. The station is named for Petrovsky Park.

== Design and layout ==
There are entrances on both sides of Leningradsky Prospekt. The interior of the station includes images of the 18th-century palace as well as silhouettes of trees to invoke images of the park. The flared columns are made of marble, while the floors consists of granite tiles.
