= Megasport Sport Palace =

Indoor sporting arena located in Russia

- Дворец спорта МЕГАСПОРТ
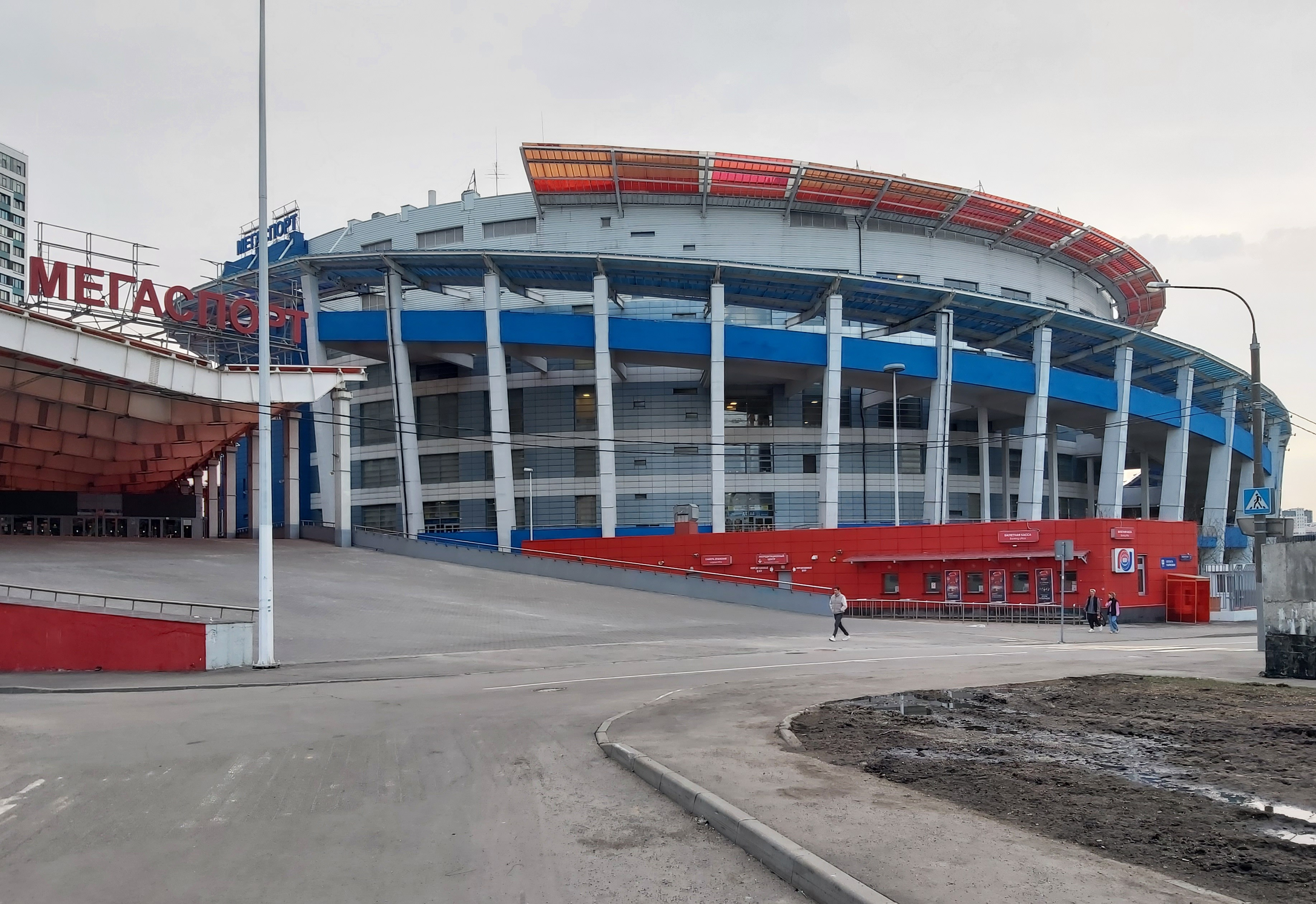
- Exterior of venue (c. 2024-03-31)
- Full name: Sport Palace "Megasport" n.a. A.V. Tarasov
- Former names: Ice Palace on Khodynka Field (planning/construction); Khodynka Arena (2006–2007)
- Address: Bulvar Khodynskiy 3 Moscow 125252; Russia
- Location: Khoroshyovsky District
- Coordinates: 55°47′12″N 37°32′25″E
- Owner: Government of Moscow
- Operator: Moscomsport
- Capacity: 16,500 Detailed capacity: Hockey: 12,396; Basketball: 12,824; Football: 12,228; Boxing: 13,998; Tennis: 13,998; Ice Show 1: 7,764; Ice Show 2: 6,336; Concert 1: 15,214; Concert 2: 12,069; Concert 3: 16,500; Forum 1: 11,214; Forum 2: 2,500
- Field size: 60×26 m
- Acreage: 45 thousand sq.m
- Public transit: Polezhayevskaya; Dinamo; Aeroport; CSKA

Construction
- Groundbreaking: 2 November 2005
- Opened: 15 December 2006; 19 years ago
- Renovated: 2015; 2017; 2019
- Cost: ₽ 2.7 billion (€ 79,1 million in 2006)
- Architects: Mosproekt-4: Andrey Bokov, D. Bush, S. Chuklov, O. Gak, V. Valuiskikh, L. Romanova, Z. Burchuladze, A. Zolotova, A. Timokhov
- Structural engineers: Mosproekt-4: E. Bekmukhamedov, M. Livshin, M. Kelman, P. Yeremeev, O. Starikov, A. Ivanov

Tenants
- PBC CSKA Moscow (2016–present); HC Spartak Moscow (2021–present)

Website
- Venue Website

Megasport Sport Palace n.a A.V. Tarasov (Russian: Дворец спорта "Мегаспорт" имени А. В. Тарасова), opened in 2006, formerly Khodynka Arena or Ice Sport Palace, is a multi-purpose indoor arena that is located in Moscow, Russia. The arena is situated in the Khodynka Field and has a maximum seating capacity of 13,926 people. The arena is primarily used to host basketball and ice hockey games.

== History ==
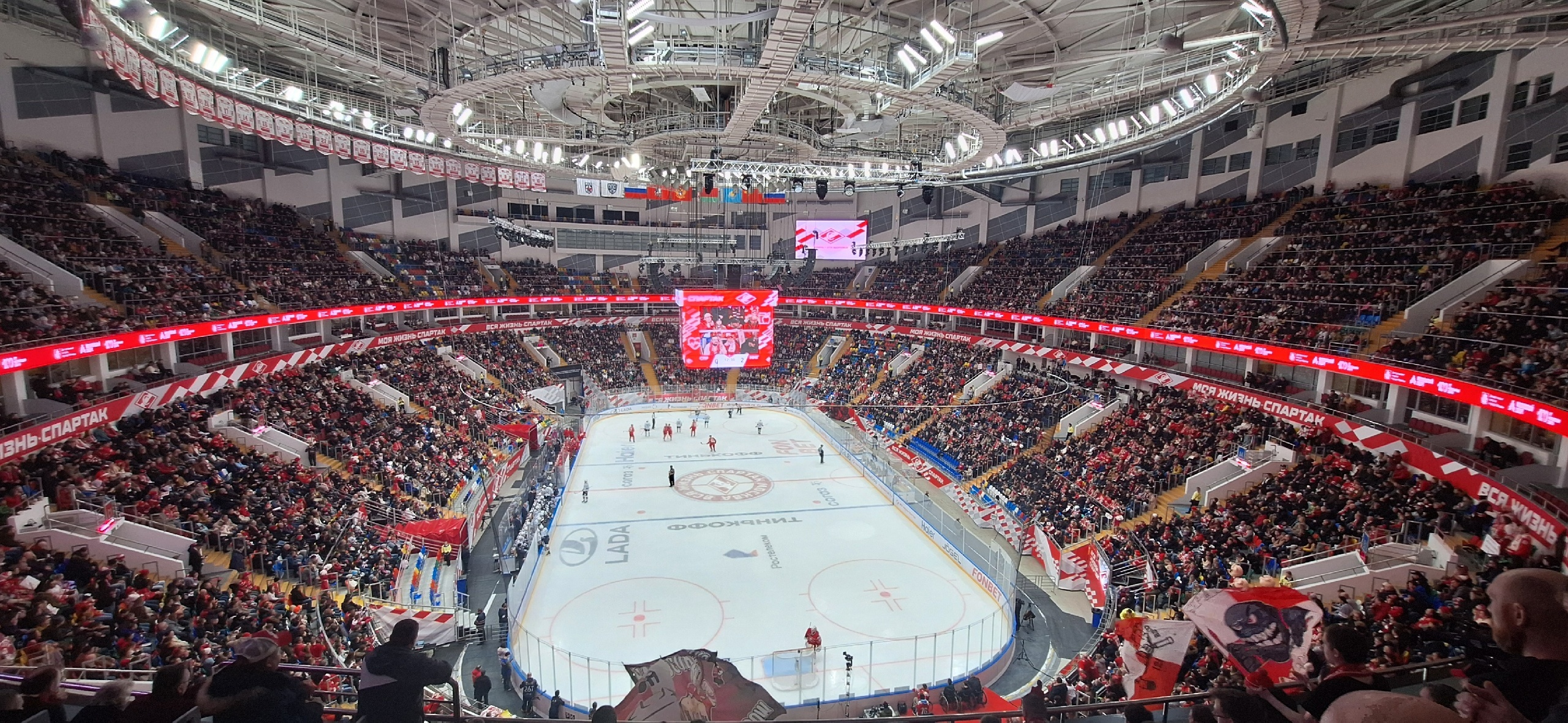
Megasport Sports Palace, Spartak – Metallurg in 2024

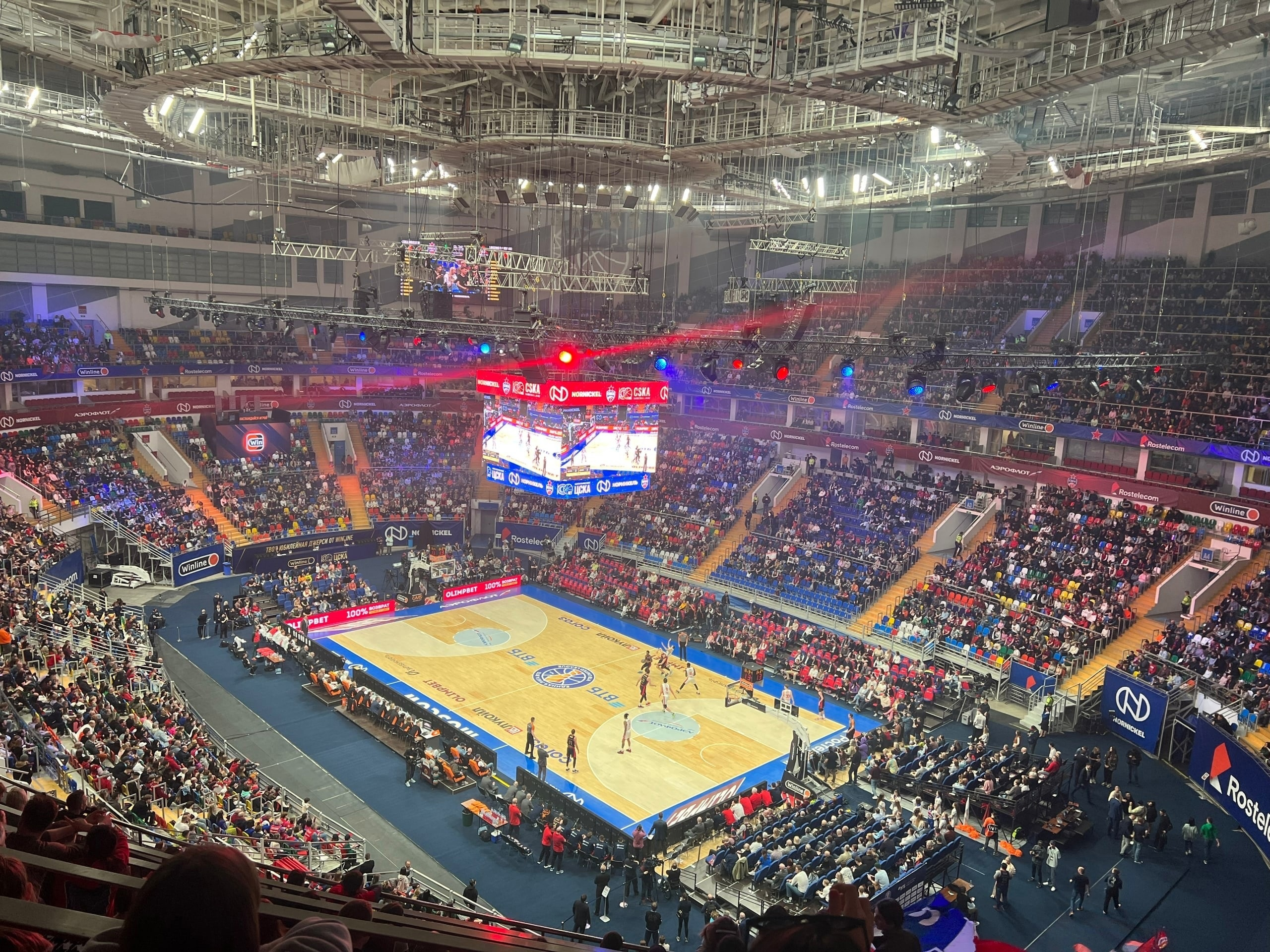
Interior of the arena during a basketball match in 2023

Construction of the new Ice Palace began on November 2, 2005. The Mayor of Moscow, Yury Luzhkov, placed a commemorative capsule in the foundation of the new building. The construction was completed in December 2006 and cost the city budget 2.7 billion rubles. It was one of the arenas that hosted the 2007 Men's World Ice Hockey Championships, and hosted multiple editions of the Channel One Cup.

On 23 January 2008, CSKA Moscow hosted a EuroLeague regular season game against TAU Cerámica in the arena, in front of a near sellout 13,000 attendance crowd. In 2016, the arena became the home arena of the CSKA Moscow basketball club for EuroLeague games. The venue hosted the Sultan Ibragimov vs. Evander Holyfield heavyweight boxing fight on October 13, 2007. Russian cruiserweight champion Denis Lebedev fought at the arena 2011 and twice in 2016, the latter time versus Murat Gassiev. The venue also hosted the 2010 European Amateur Boxing Championships.

The arena hosted was the 2006–07 CEV Champions League Final four, in which Tours VB won the title, after defeating VfB Friedrichshafen. In November 2008, the Cup of Russia figure skating competition was held at the arena. The 2011 Fed Cup tennis match between Russia and Italy and the 2012 Fed Cup tennis match between Russia and Serbia were held at the arena.

The Legends Cup (Russia) mini-soccer tournament was held at the arena from 2009 to 2012 and from 2017 to 2018.

On March 24, 2011, the International Skating Union (ISU) relocated the 2011 World Figure Skating Championships to the Megasport Arena, in Moscow. This decision followed the cancellation of the championships in Tokyo, Japan, due to the 2011 Tōhoku earthquake and tsunami. The championships were staged from April 24 to May 1, 2011.

The 2011 European Curling Championships were also hosted at the arena, in December 2011.

Since 2017, the palace has been named after the great Soviet coach Anatoly Tarasov.

In June 2021 KHL's Spartak Moscow announced their plans to move into Megasport for the upcoming season.

== See also ==
- List of indoor arenas in Russia
- List of European ice hockey arenas

Events and tenants
| Preceded by PalaLottomatica; Rome | CEV Champions League; Final Venue; 2007 | Succeeded by Hala MOSiR; Łódź |
