= Leningradsky Avenue =

Major arterial avenue in Moscow, Russia

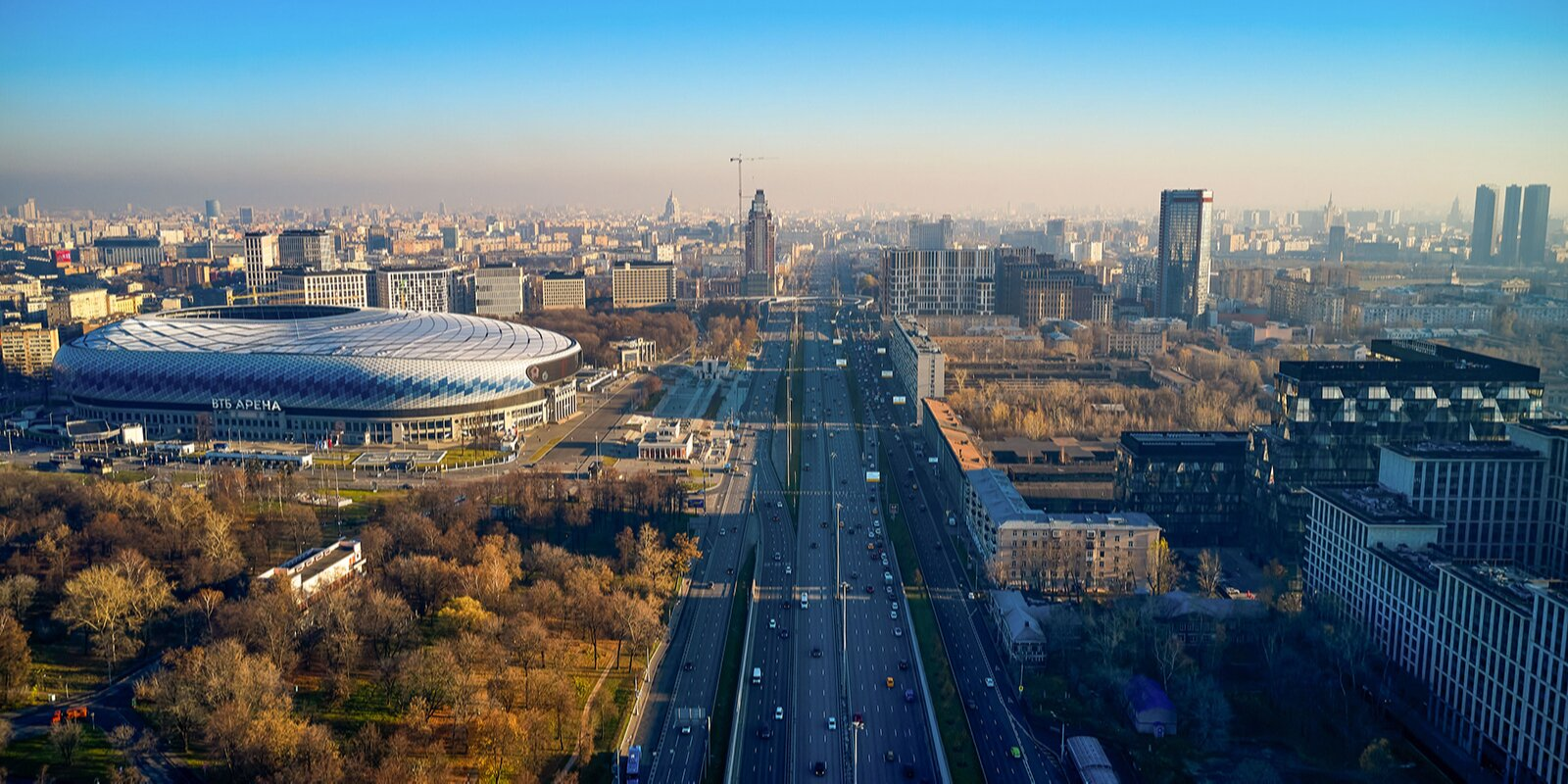
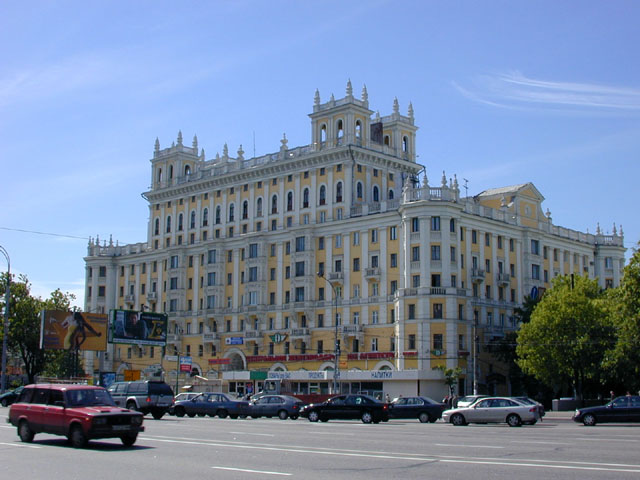
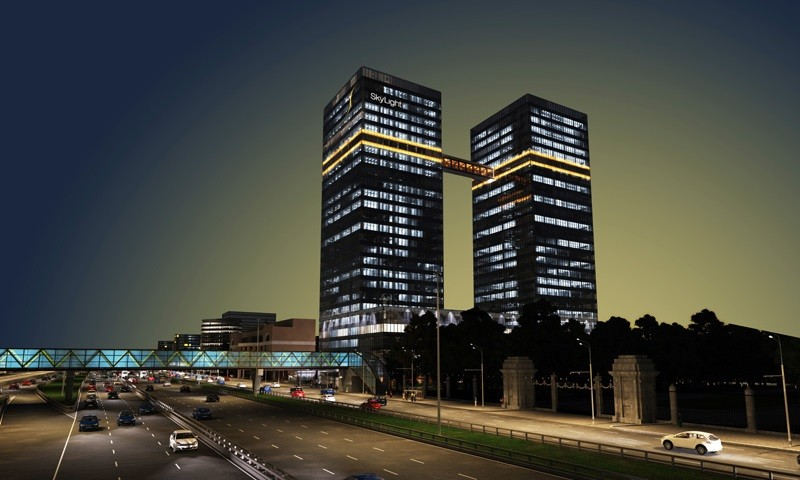
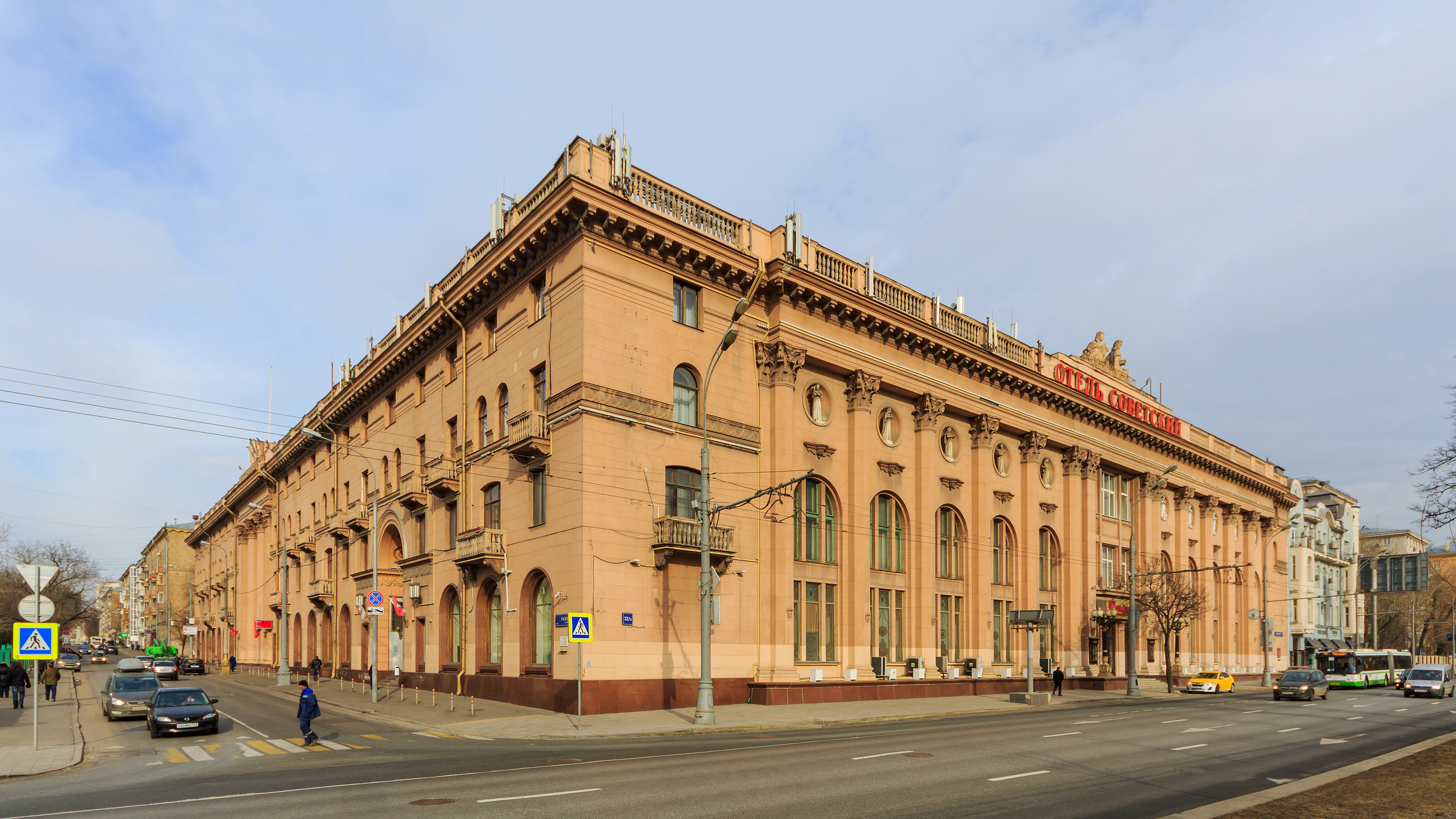
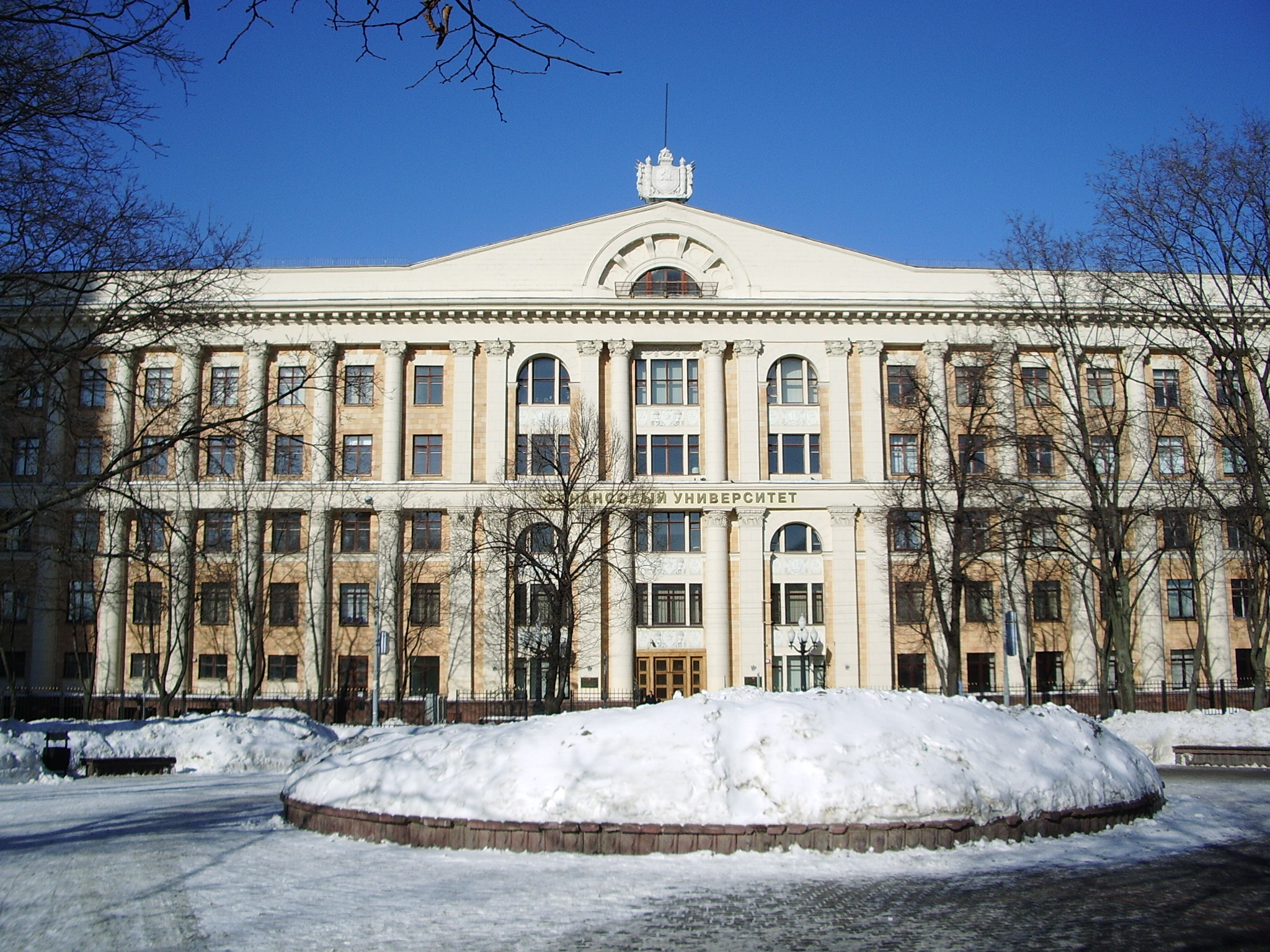
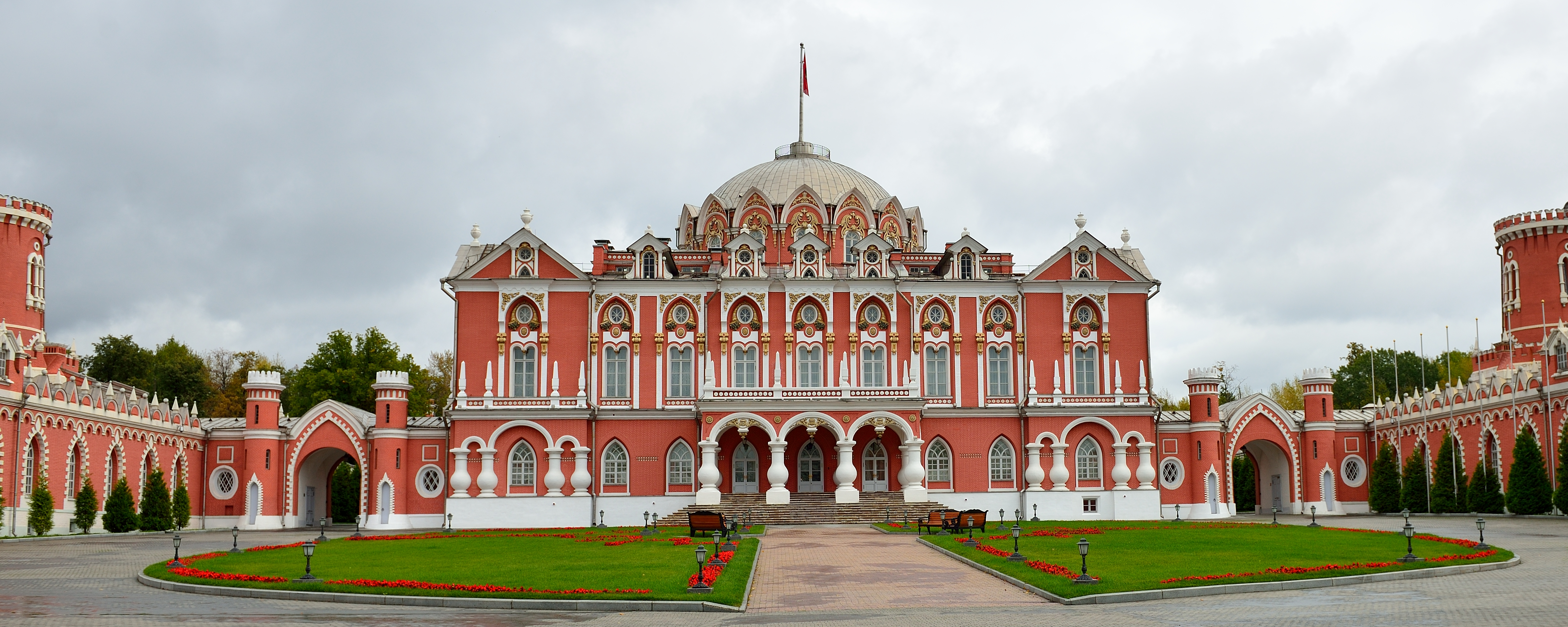
- VTB Arena building in Stalinist architecture Mail.ru office Hotel Sovetsky Financial University Petrovsky Palace
- Native name: Ленинградский проспект (Russian)
- Length: 5.6 km (3.5 mi)
- Location: Moscow; Northern Administrative Okrug
- Nearest metro station: Belorusskaya; Dinamo; Aeroport; Sokol
- Coordinates: 55°47′34″N 37°32′54″E

Leningradsky Prospekt (Russian: Ленингра́дский проспе́кт), or Leningrad Avenue, is a major arterial avenue in Moscow, Russia. It extends north-west from Belorussky Rail Terminal as a continuation of Tverskaya Street and 1st Tverskaya-Yamskaya Street, changing its name to Leningradskoye Highway past Sokol station on its way toward Saint Petersburg via Tver.

== History ==
The old road to Tver, with medieval origins, assumed its current alignment in the 16th century. Named Peterburskoye Shosse (Petersburg Highway) when paved between 1786 and 1790.

=== Petrovsky Palace ===
The Gothic Revival Petrovsky Palace, built in 1776–1780 by Matvey Kazakov, served as a royal stopover for journeys between Moscow and Saint Petersburg. Coaches for the general public operated from Vsekhsvyatskoye village near modern-day Sokol metro station.

=== 19th-century development ===
In the 1830s, General Alexander Bashilov designed a grid of streets north of Petrovsky Palace, with two streets still bearing his name. Khodynka Field hosted military drills and the national Exhibition of Industry and Arts (1882–1896), later relocated to Nizhny Novgorod. The Smolensky Rail Station opened in 1870. By the late 19th century, the area featured factories, working-class housing, and estates like those of the Morozov family, Nikolay Eichenwald, and Fyodor Schechtel.

== Modern history ==
The Sokol Settlement, built in the early 1920s, remains one of Moscow’s last single-family neighborhoods alongside Serebryany Bor. Khodynka Aerodrome served as Moscow’s primary airport until the 1950s. Transportation evolved from trams (1901–2005) and trolleybuses (1933) to the Moscow Metro (opened 1938). Notable landmarks include:

- Dynamo Stadium
- CSKA Moscow’s sports arenas
- Moscow Aviation Institute
- Financial University under the Government of the Russian Federation
- Triumph-Palace skyscraper
- 1730s Baroque Church of All Saints (photographs), noted for its leaning bell tower.

=== Highway construction, 2005–2013 ===
From 2005 to 2013, Moscow converted Leningradsky Prospekt into a 12-lane freeway with frontage roads. Key phases:

=== Central segment (2007–2009) ===
- Redevelopment of Pushkin Square, Triumphalnaya Square, and Belorussky Rail Terminal plaza
- Tunnel between Pushkin Square and Belorussky Terminal
- Traffic reorganization in adjacent streets

=== Prospekt segment ===
- Overpass at the Third Ring crossing (2006)
- Tunnels near Dinamo (2006) and Aeroport stations (2007)
- Elevated link to Leningradskoye Highway (2008)

=== Highway segment (completed 2013) ===
- Redevelopment near Voykovskaya and Festivalnaya Street
- Second Leningradsky Bridge
- Rebuilt MKAD crossing

The project drew criticism for removing historic tram lines and unresolved congestion in Khimki. A toll road bypass to Sheremetyevo Airport remains under discussion.

== Public transportation access ==
The avenue is served by the Zamoskvoretskaya Line (Line 2) of the Moscow Metro, from Belorusskaya to Sokol. Traffic congestion eased post-2013.
