= Khodynka Field =

Public space in Moscow, Russia

Coordinates: 55.7872°N 37.5326°E

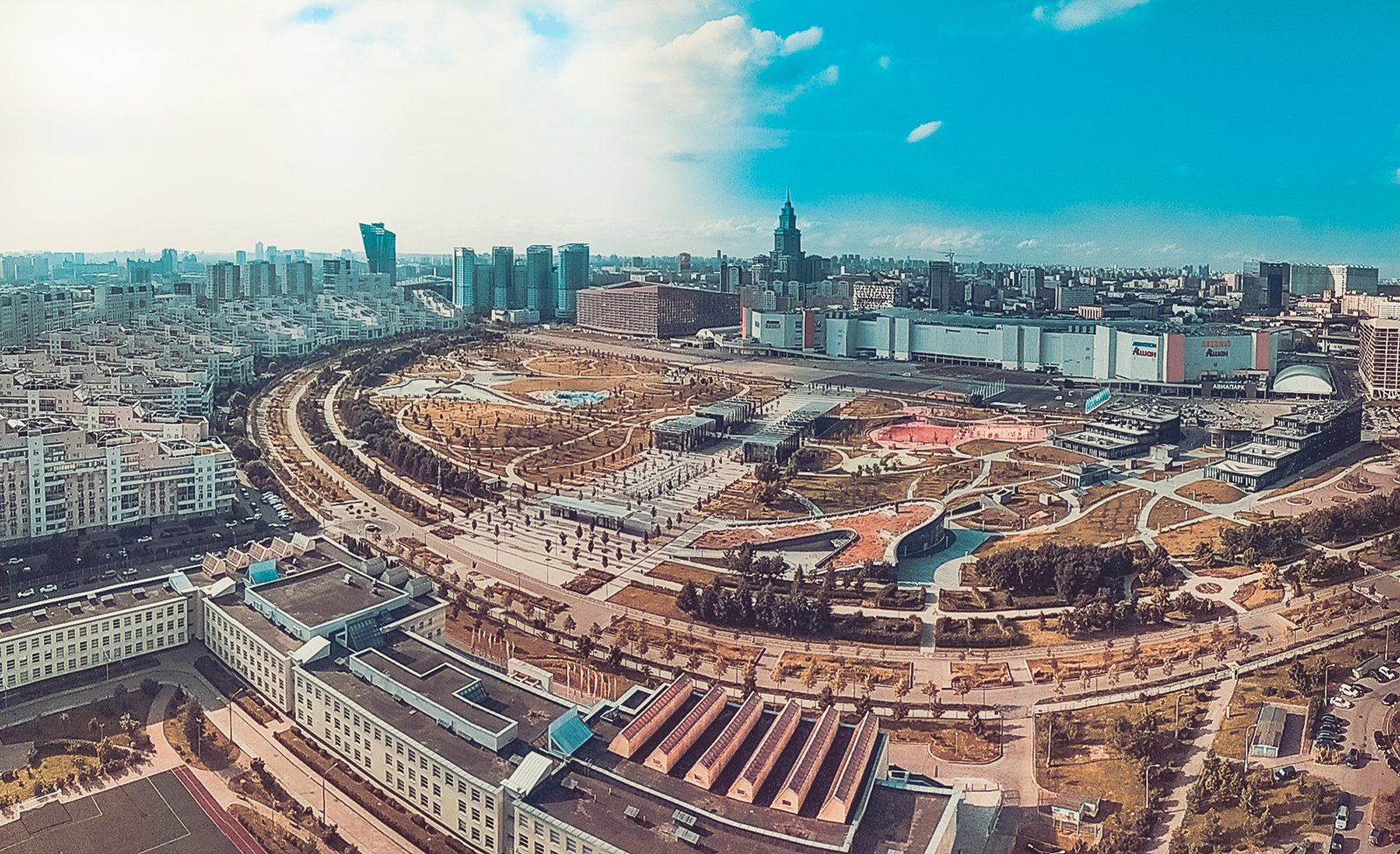
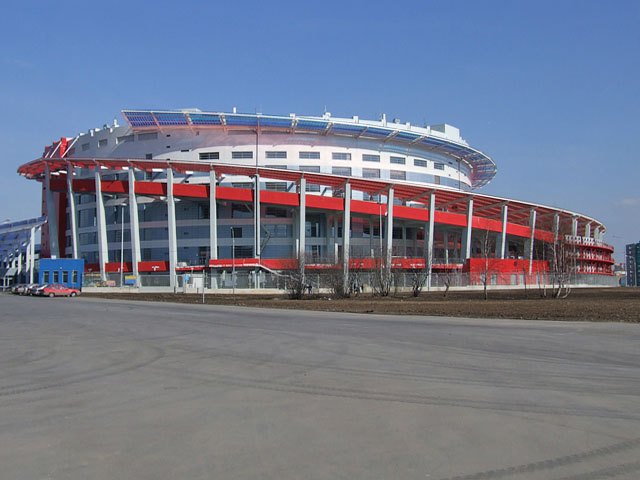
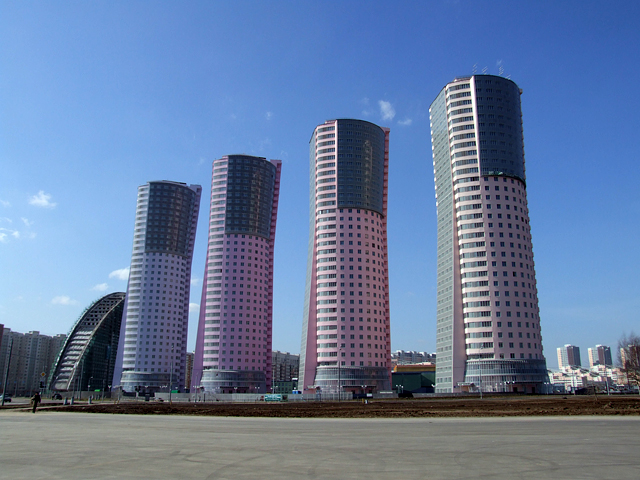
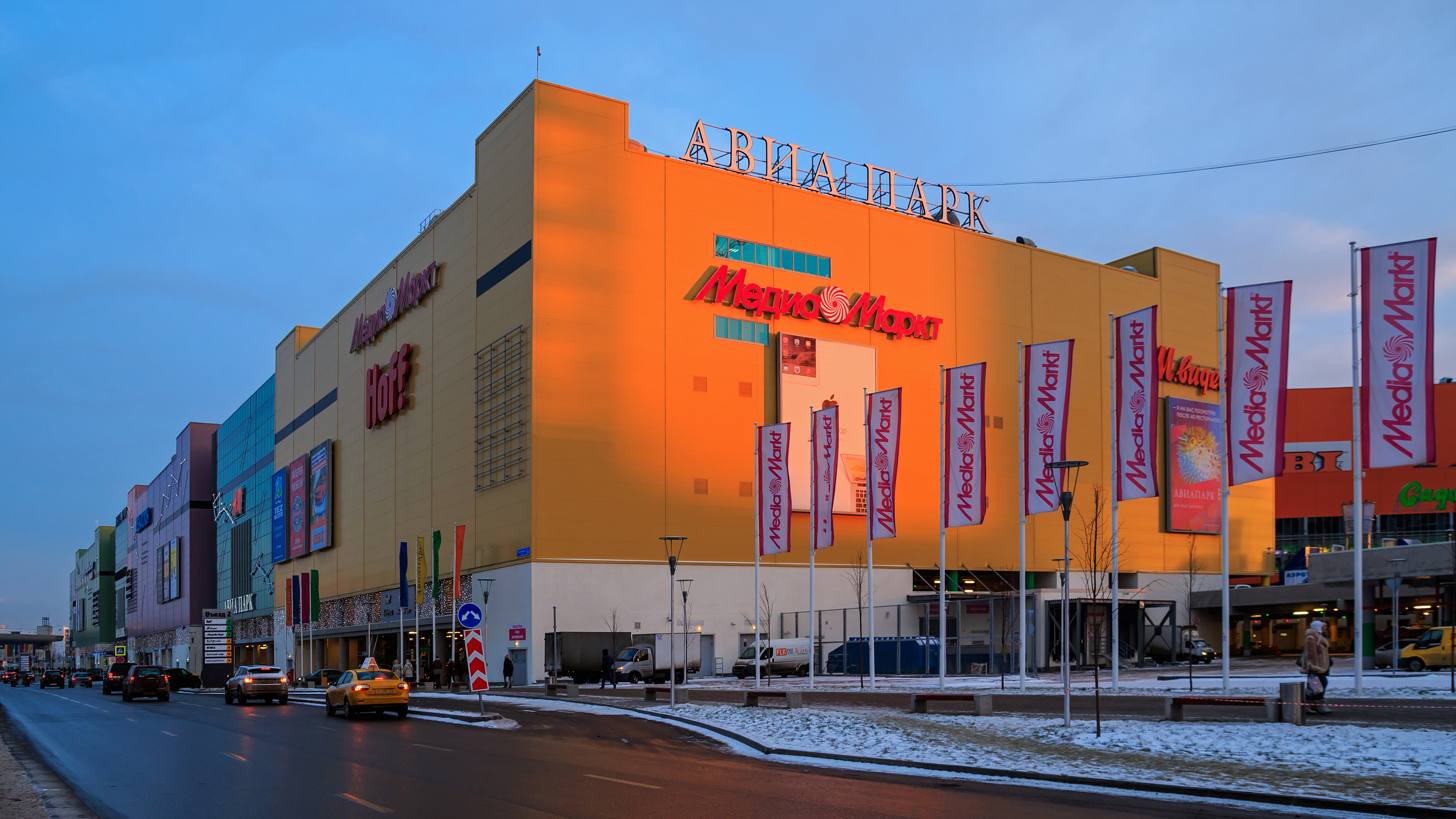
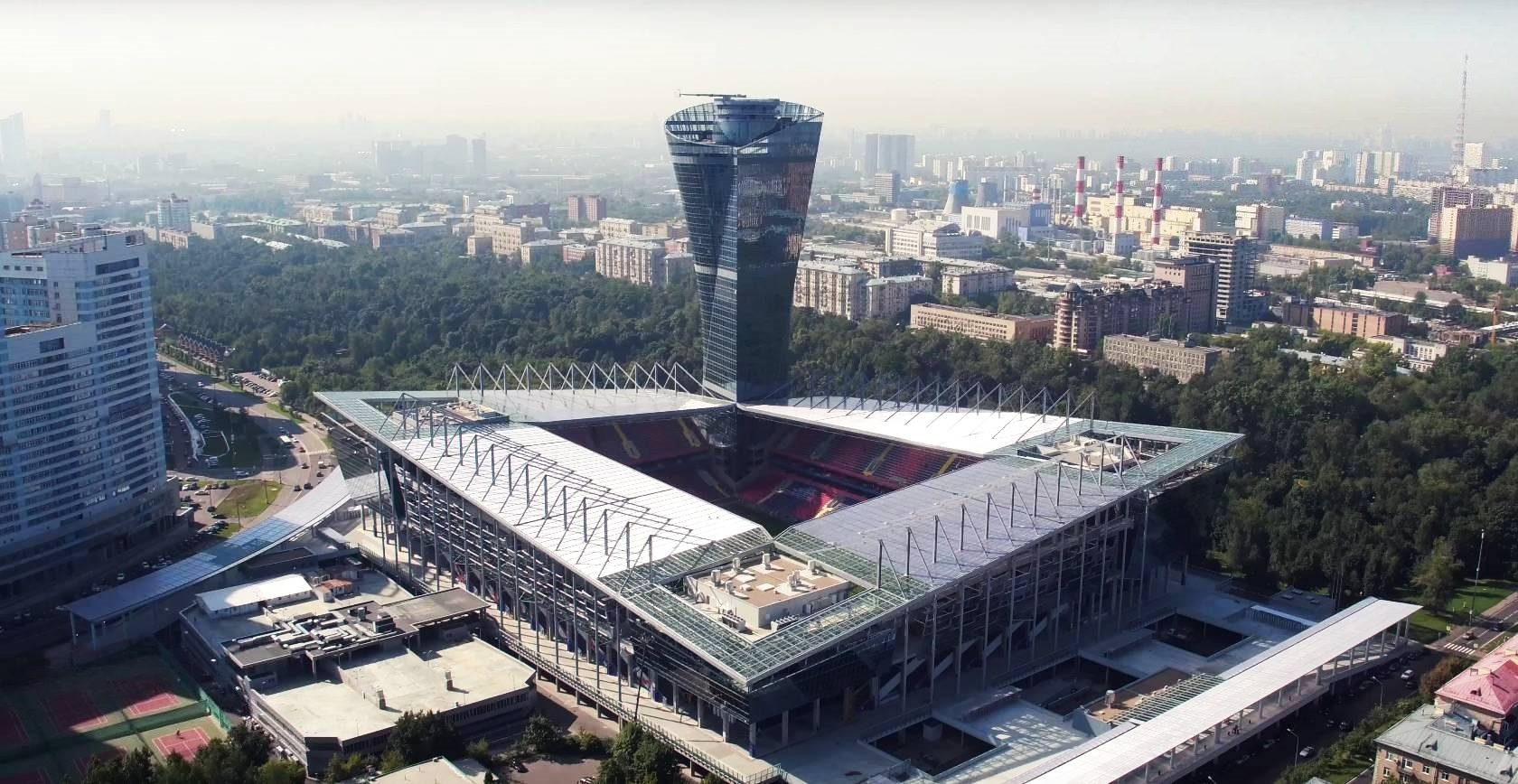
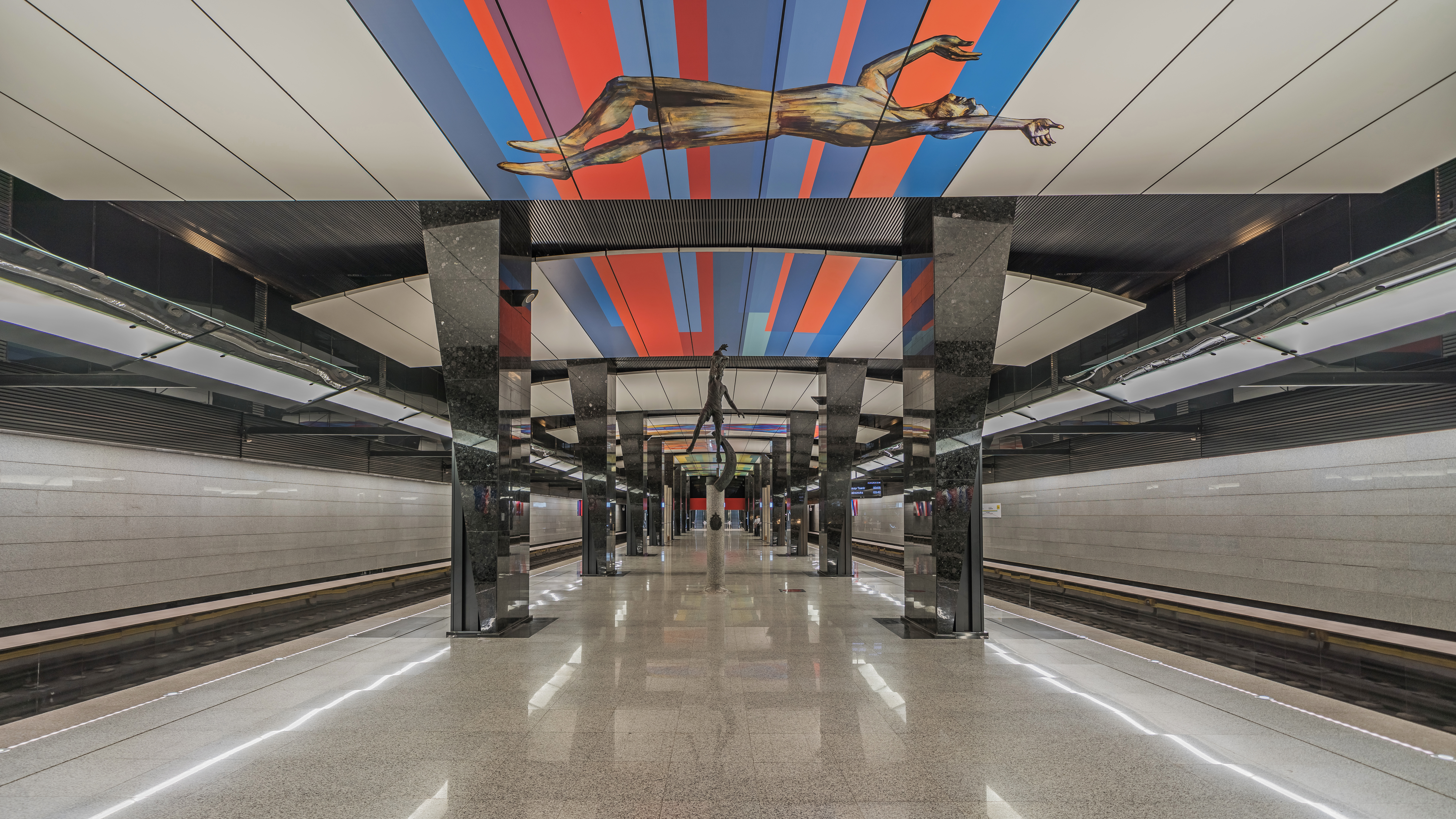
- Clockwise from top: Khodynka Field park, Houses on the Khodynka Field, VEB Arena, CSKA Metro station, Aviapark, Megasport Palace
- Interactive map of Khodynka Field
- Native name: Ходынское поле (Russian)
- Location: Moscow; Northern Administrative Okrug; North-Western Administrative Okrug
- Nearest metro station: Aeroport; Dinamo; Sokol; Oktyabrskoye Polye; Begovaya; Polezhayevskaya; Shchukinskaya; CSKA

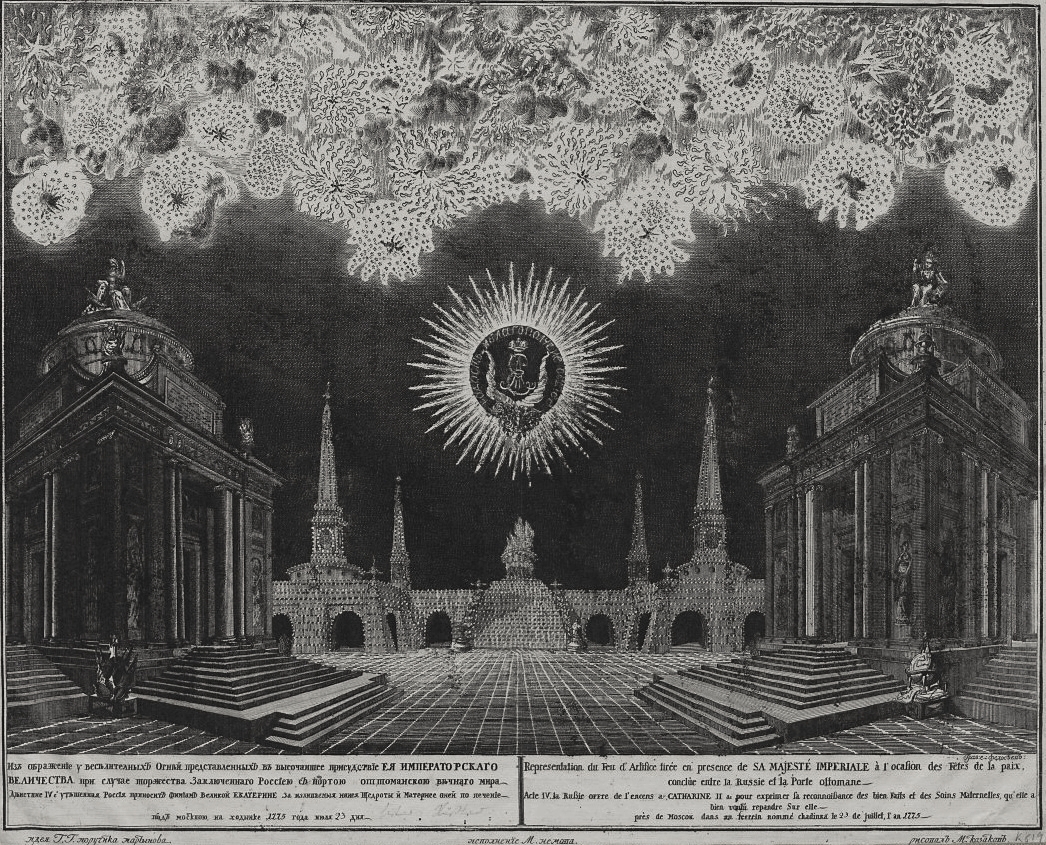
Fireworks at the Khodynka Field, a 1775 etching by Yemelyan Alekseevich Fedoseev in the National Museum in Warsaw commemorating celebrations and amusements on the occasion of the signing of the Treaty of Küçük Kaynarca

Khodynka Field (Russian: Ходынское поле, Khodynskoye pole) is a large open space in the north-west of Moscow, at the beginning of the present day Leningradsky Prospect. It takes its name from the small Khodynka River which used to cross the neighbourhood.

The field is close to several Moscow Metro stations including Dinamo and Aeroport on the Zamoskvoretskaya Line, and Oktyabrskoe Pole on the Tagansko-Krasnopresnenskaya Line, which is named after Khodynka field.

== Early history ==
Khodynka Field (up to the 17th century "Khodinskiy Meadow") has been known as such since the 14th century. The first mention of this name dates back to 1389, when Knyaz Dmitry Donskoy bequeathed Khodyinsky Meadow to his son Yuri Dmitrievich.

For a long time the field was undeveloped, placed it on arable land Tver coachmen settlement. At the beginning of the 17th century, the army of Tsar Vasili IV fought here against the troops of False Dmitry II.

During the reign of Catherine the Great, in 1775, the field was the scene of grand festivities on the successful conclusion of the war with Turkey with the Treaty of Küçük Kaynarca.

In the 19th century, Khodynka was used to celebrate state occasions. In June 1883, the coronation of Alexander III was celebrated here. The event was co-ordinated by Mikhail Lentovsky and included four theatres, a circus, puppet shows, choirs, and orchestras. The climax was an allegorical procession entitled Spring is Beautiful. In May 1896, the site was used to celebrate the coronation of Tsar Nicholas II. Rumours about a shortage in food and that the coronation mugs contained a gold coin resulted in a stampede in which more than 1,000 (some sources say 1,500) people were trampled to death (see Khodynka Tragedy).

Major constructions on the field included the 19th century military barracks and the Botkin Hospital, the largest in Moscow at the time of its inauguration in 1910.

=== Khodynka Tragedy ===
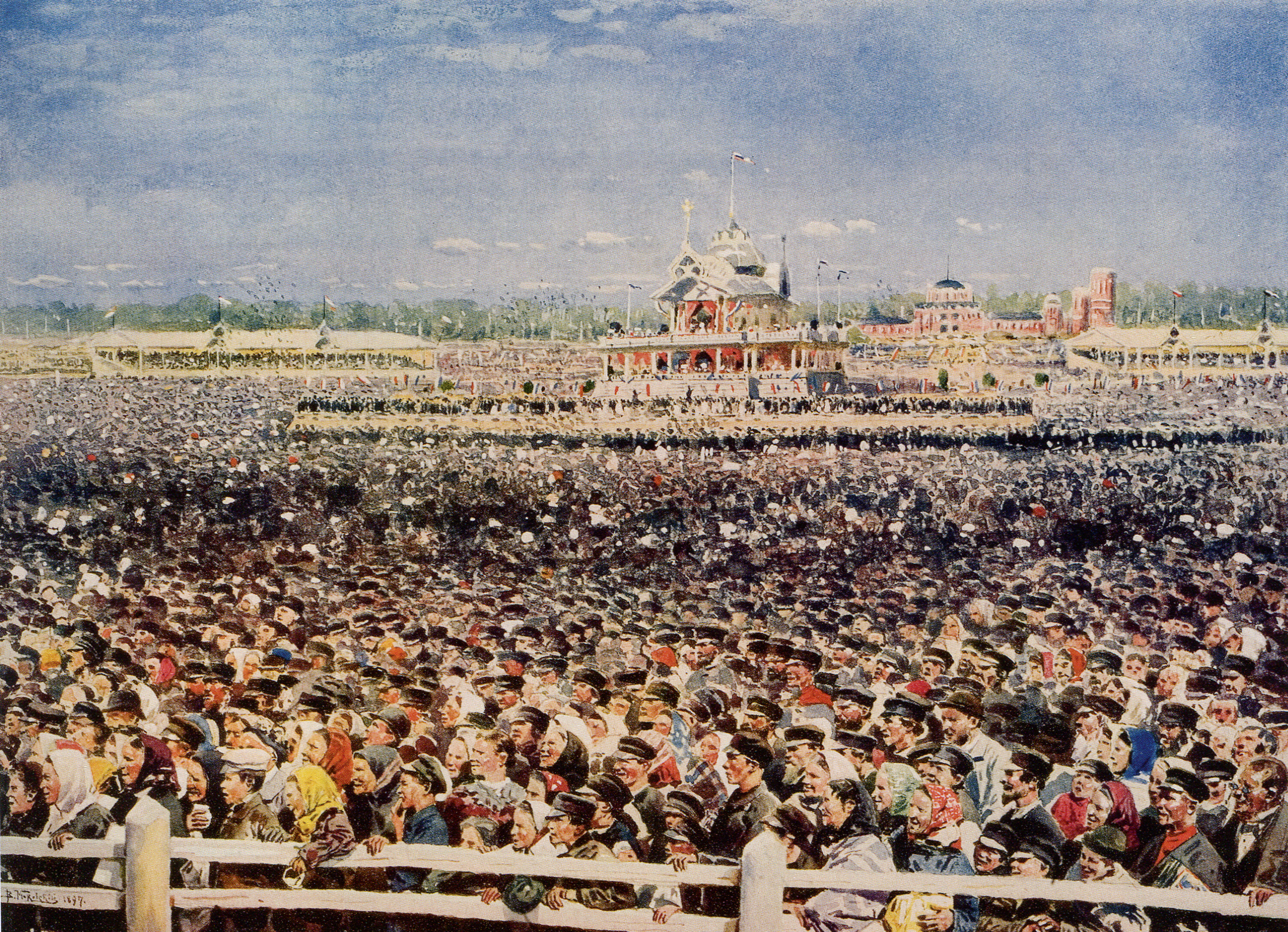
Crowds at Khodynka Field, 1896

The field is best known as the site of a tragic accident on May 30, 1896 during the festivities of the crowning of Nicholas II.

In the area of one town square, buffooneries, theaters, 150 buffets for distribution of gifts, and 20 pubs were built for the celebrations. Nearby to the celebration square was a field which had a ravine and many gullies. On the evening of May 17, people who had heard rumours of rich coronation gifts from the tsar (the gift was actually a bread roll, a piece of sausage, gingerbread and a cup) began to gather in anticipation.

At about 5 o'clock in the morning of the coronation day, several thousand people were already gathered on the field. A police force of 1800 men failed to maintain civil order, and in a catastrophic crush, and resulting panic to flee the scene, 1389 people were trampled to death and roughly 1300 were otherwise injured.

The negligence of the imperial authorities caused public indignation in Russia, and a number of minor officials were dismissed. However, the new Tsar did not cancel the coronation ball scheduled for later that day. Many mystic writers in Russia say that deed predestined the death of Nicholas in Soviet Russia.

== Khodynka Airfield ==
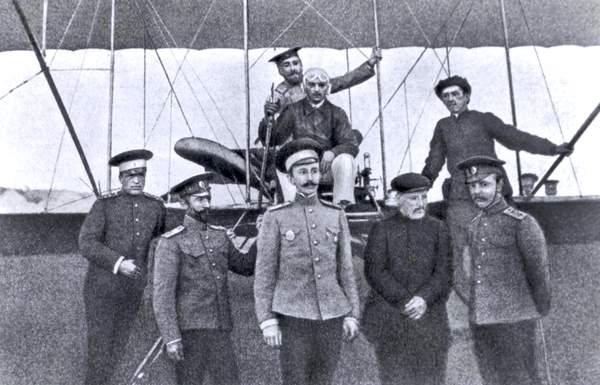
Khodynka was Moscow's first civilian aerodrome and for many years was a private airfield used by flying enthusiasts.

The first powered flight in Russia took place at Khodynka, carried out in 1910 by Boris Rossinsky. In 1911, pilot Alexander Vasiliev landed his Bleriot XI there, becoming the only finisher of 11 pilots who started a 453-mile race from St. Petersburg to Moscow. Starting in the 1930s, the airfield played annual host to Aviation Day festivities, held on the third weekend in August.

A. S. Yakovlev worked as a mechanic at the airfield for a time in the 1920s, and examined the wrecks of various aircraft present in the ravine near the field during work on his earliest powered aircraft designs.

The airfield is surrounded by a variety of restricted-access facilities, including the main headquarters of Aeroflot, design bureaux for Ilyushin, Mikoyan Gurevich (MiG), Sukhoi and Yakovlev, the Aircraft Production Organization No. 30 (MAPO), and GRU headquarters ("the Aquarium"). The National Aviation and Space Museum (aka the National Aeronautics Museum or the Museum of the Air Forces) was on the airfield proper.

Flights into or out of the airfield apparently continued to at least 1989, but the runways existed into the 2000s.

Past plans for the site included a modern air and space museum, expected to be the largest in the world upon completion.

== Modern developments ==
After the fall of the Soviet Union, the International Society for Krishna Consciousness hoped to have the largest temple in Russia to be erected there, but this did not come to pass due to vocal opposition by the Russian Orthodox Church.

Megasport Arena, an ice sport palace, was opened on the Khodynka Field in 2006, and hosts EuroLeague matches of the PBC CSKA Moscow basketball club. In 2016 CSKA Moscow Stadium was opened on the opposite side of Megasport arena, serving as a home venue for football club CSKA Moscow.

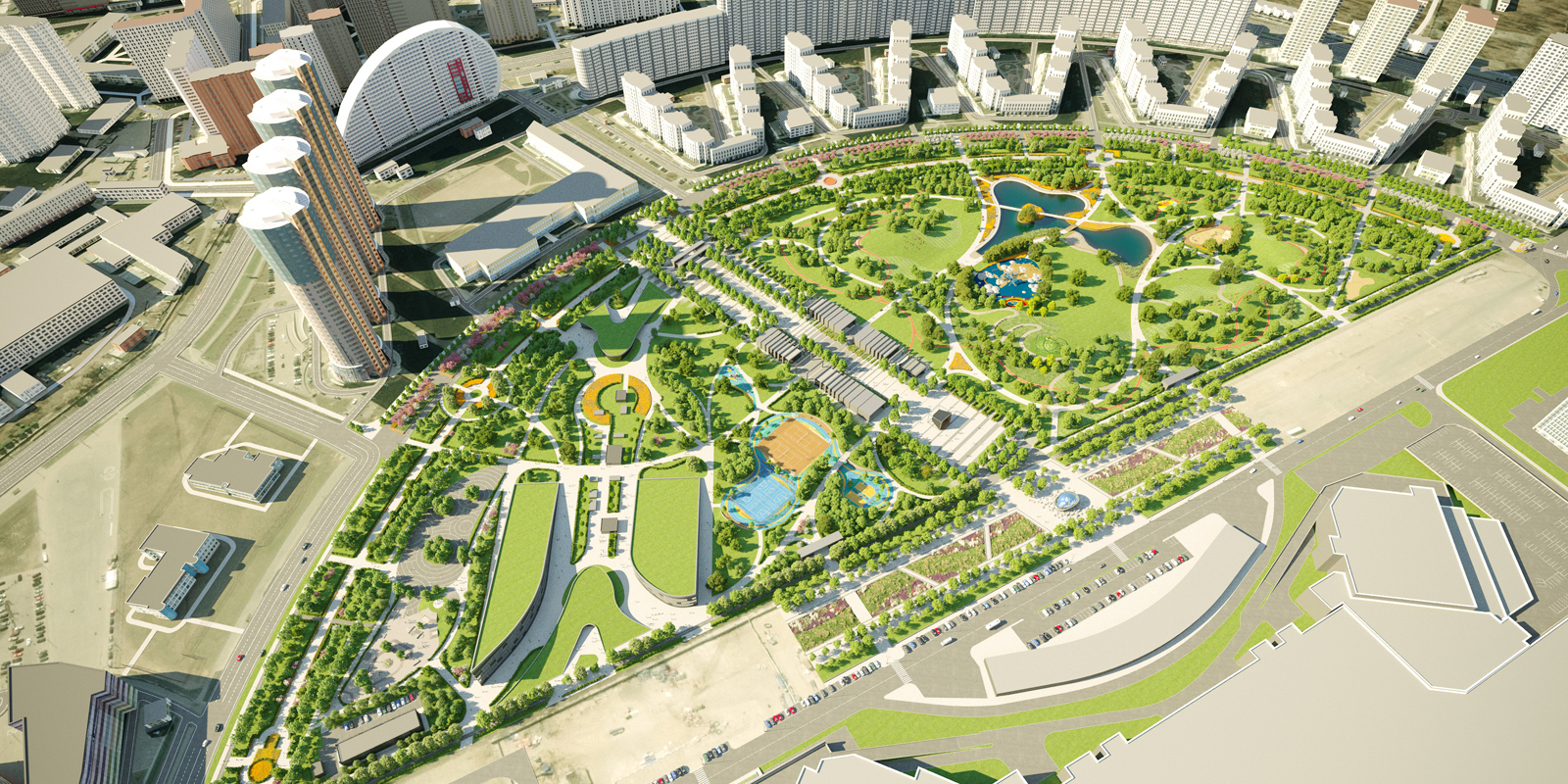
Khodynka Field park, 3D model

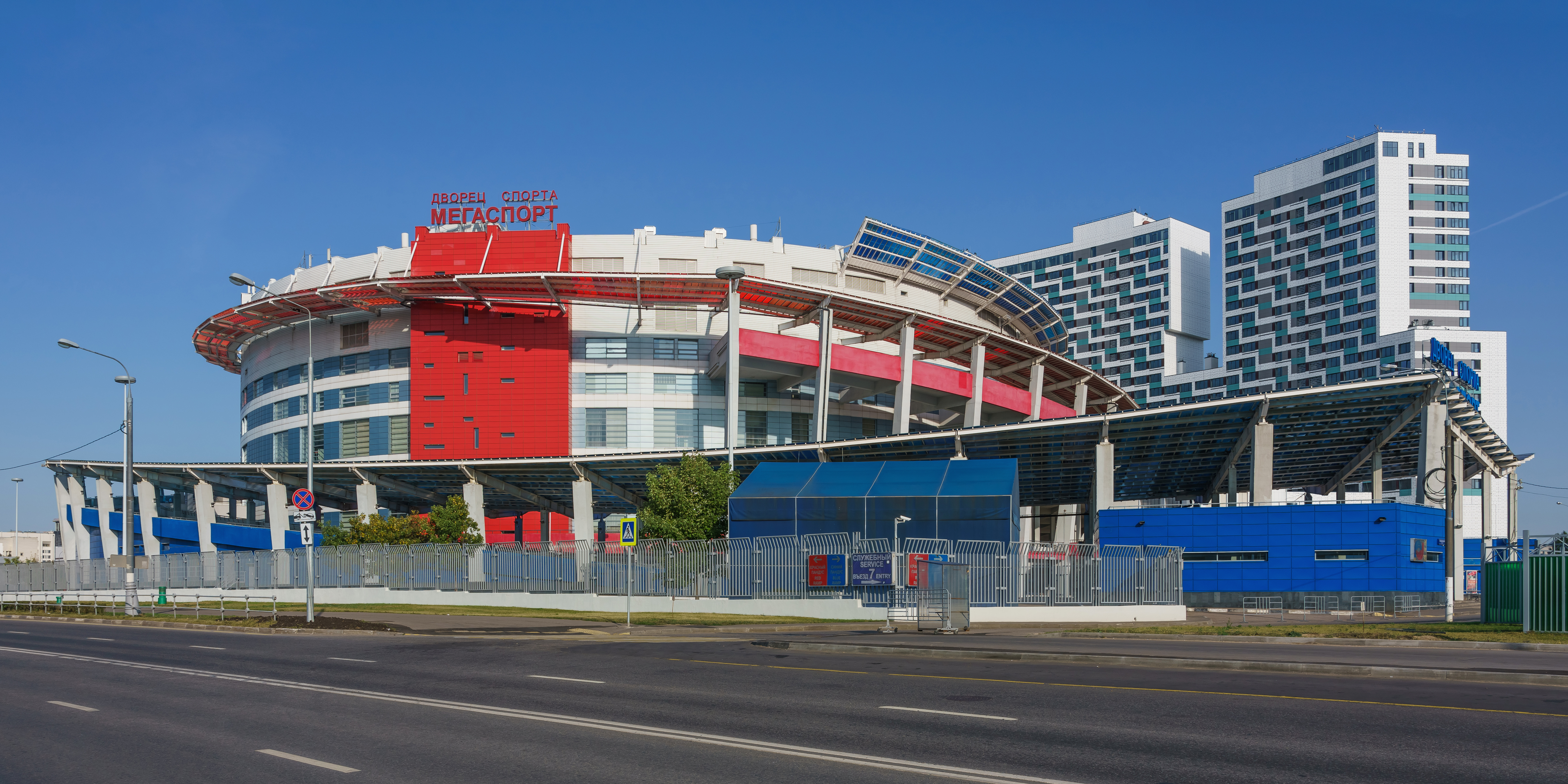
Megasport Arena, opened in 2006

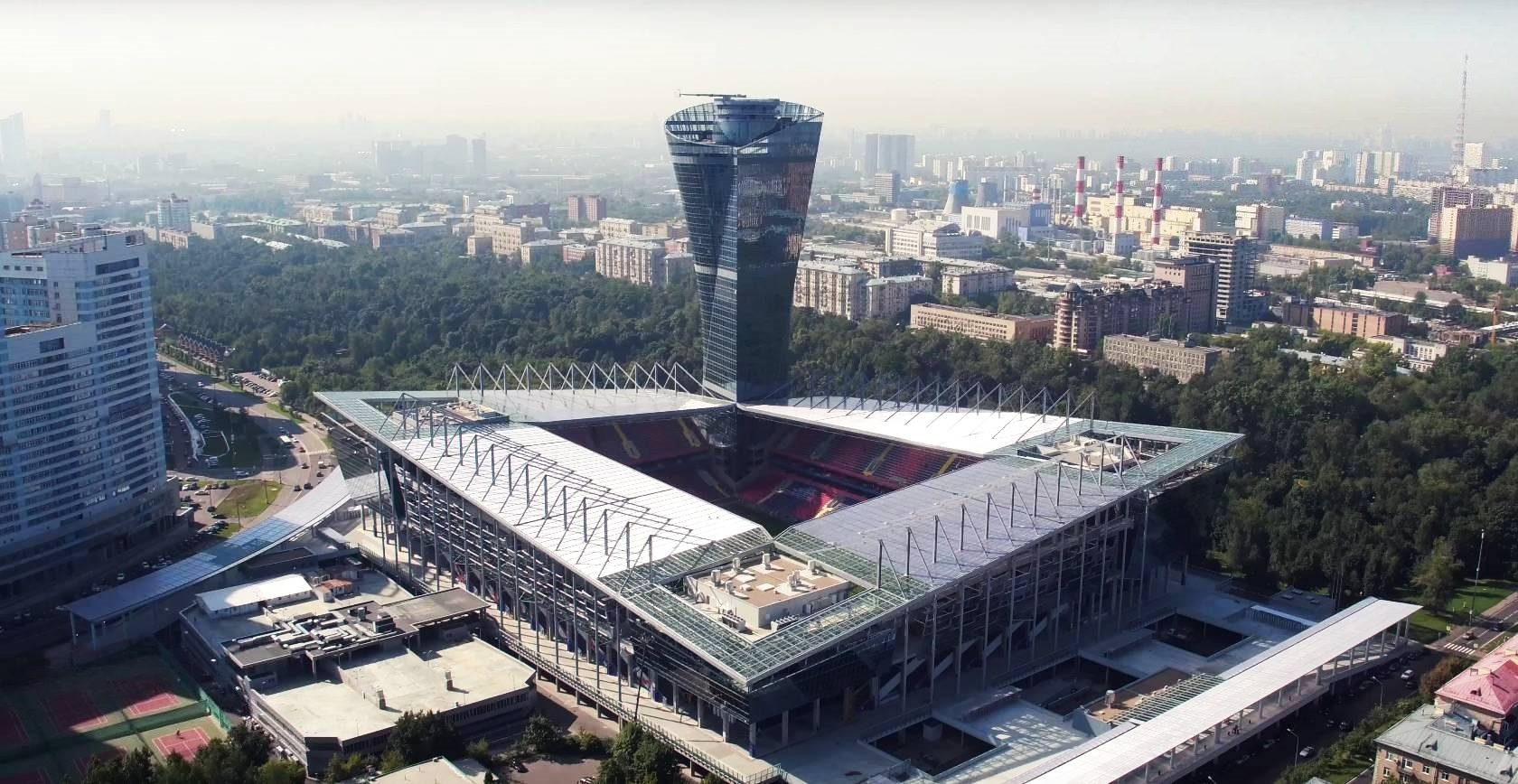
CSKA Stadium, opened in 2016

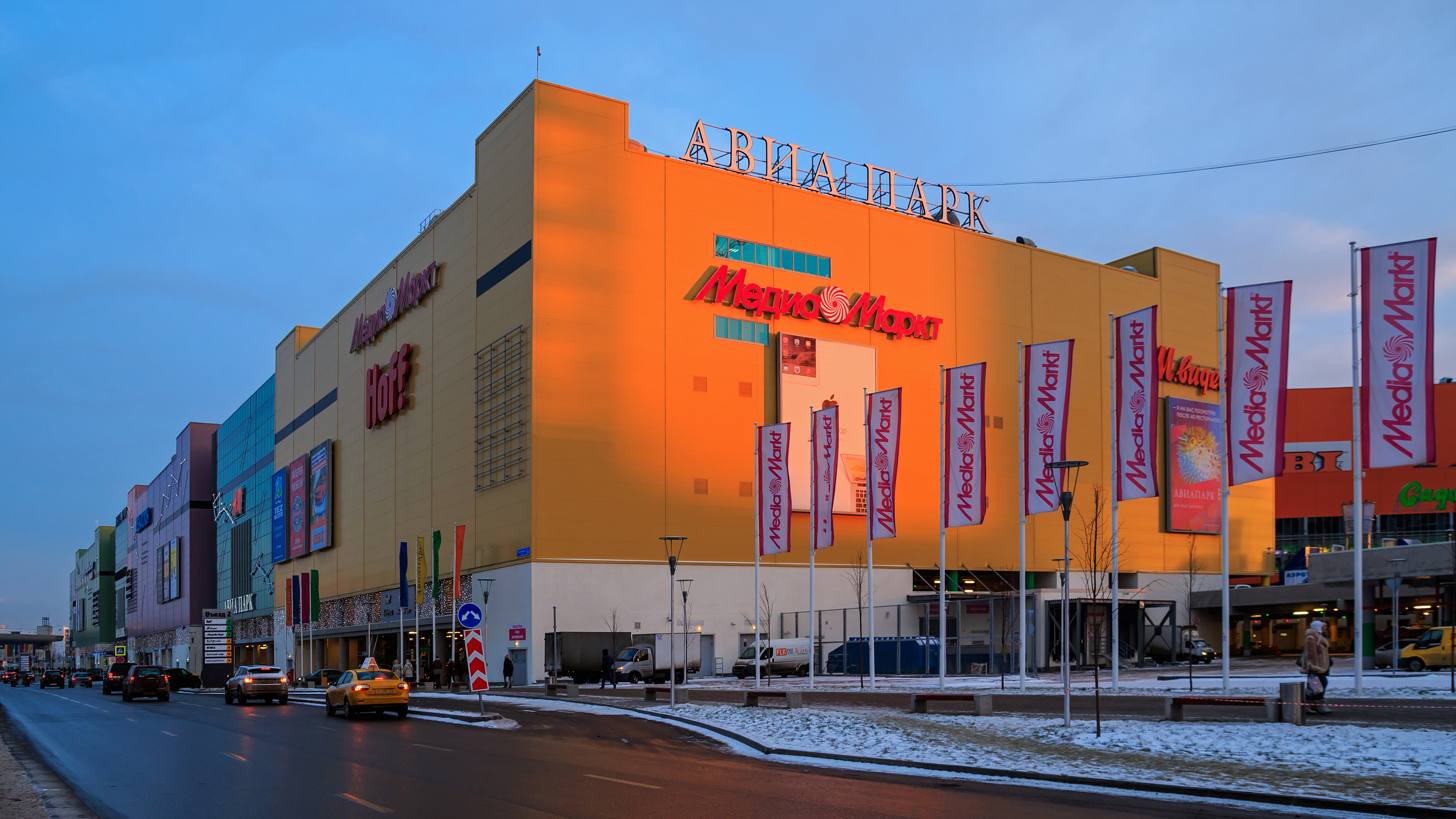
Aviapark, Europe's biggest shopping mall
