= Bashilov =

Bashilov (Russian: Башилов) is a Russian masculine surname, its feminine counterpart is Bashilova. Notable people with the surname include:

- Alexander Bashilov (1777–1847), Russian military officer
- Mikhail Bashilov (born 1993), Russian football player
