= Khodynka Aerodrome =

Airport in Khodynka Field, Moscow, Russia

Khodynka Ходынский
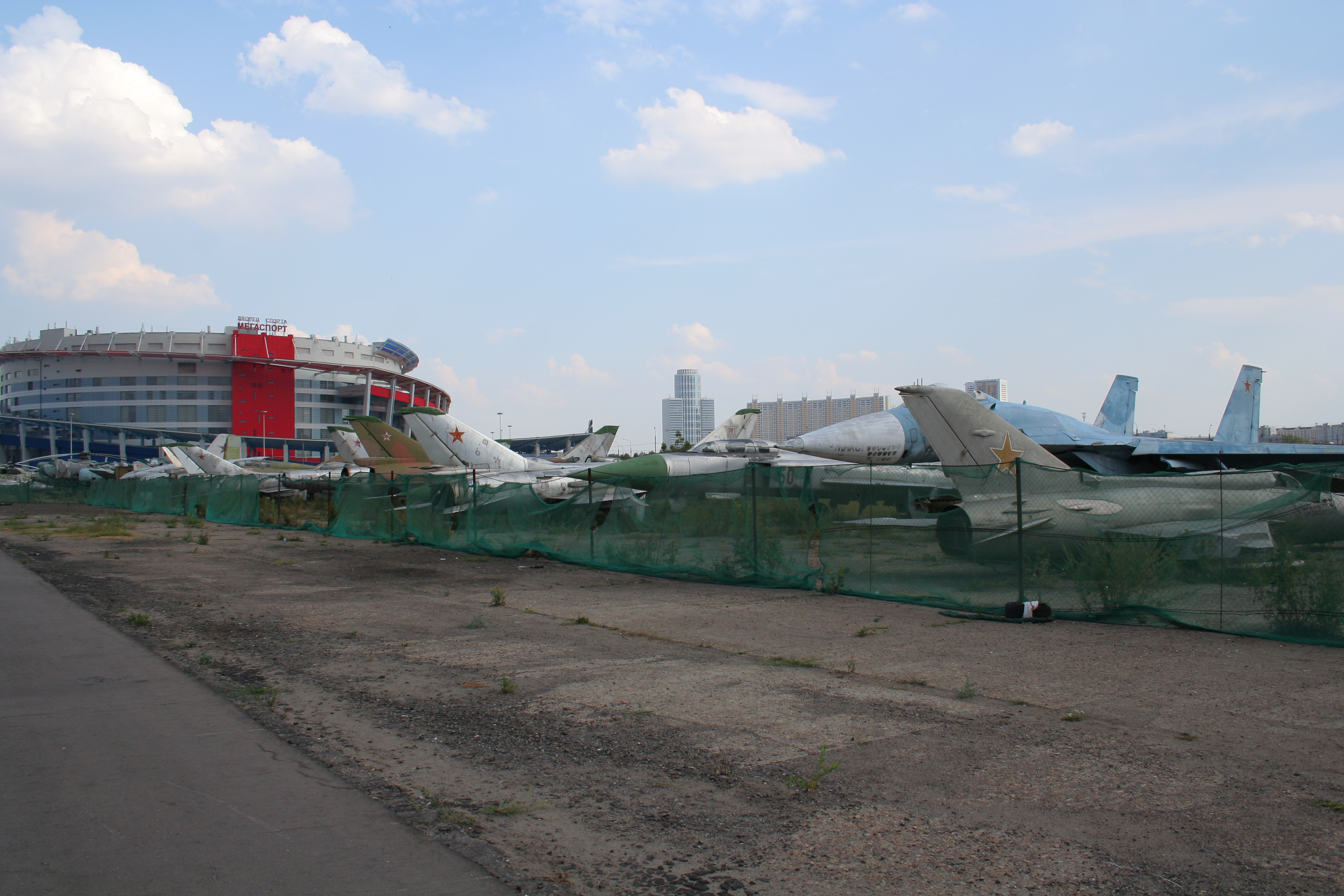
- IATA: none; ICAO: none

Summary
- Airport type: Defunct
- Location: Khodynka Field, Moscow
- Opened: 1910
- Closed: 2003
- Elevation AMSL: 153 m (502 ft)
- Coordinates: 55.7883°N 37.5333°E
- Interactive map of Khodynka

Runways
Direction	Length		Surface
Direction	m	ft	Surface
09/27	1,460	4,790	Concrete
			Concrete

Khodynka (Russian: Ходынский, Khodynskiy), officially Frunze Central Aerodrome, formerly known as Central (Tsentralny, Центральный аэродром имени М. В. Фрунзе), was an airport in Moscow, Russia, located northwest of the centre of the city.

== History ==
The aerodrome was founded on 17 June 1910, when the Moscow Aeronautical Society announced that the staff of the Moscow Military District had approved the allocation of land in the territory of Khodynka field as an airfield. Donations from aviation enthusiasts met much of the cost of the construction of the facility. There resulted a runway and six small hangars for aeroplanes. The official opening took place on 3 October 1910 in the presence of military authorities and of many Russian aviators. M. F. De Campo Scipio made the first takeoff.

In 1920, the Scientific-Test Airfield NOA GU RKKVF, which was to become today's 929th State Flight Test Centre named for V. P. Chkalov, was established at the airfield.

On 3 May 1922, the first ever Russian international flight on the route Moscow - Königsberg - Berlin took place. On 15 July 1923, the first regular domestic passenger flights between Moscow and Nizhny Novgorod started - the 420 km route took 2.5 hours in a 4-seater AK-1 monoplane.

From 1923 to 1926, the facility bore the name "Central L. D. Trotsky Aerodrome" (Центральный аэродром имени Л. Д. Троцкого). Subsequently, it officially became "Central M. V. Frunze Aerodrome" (Центральный аэродром имени М. В. Фрунзе).

From 1932 to 1935, the scientific-testing institute was relocated to Chkalovsky near Shchelkovo.

In 1938, the airport gave its name to the newly opened Moscow Metro station Aeroport to the north of the runway.

Khodynka remained the only airport in Moscow until the opening of Bykovo in 1933 (Tushino opened in 1935, Vnukovo in 1941). Passenger flights ceased in the late 1940s, and from 1950s onwards, the aerodrome was used only for ferrying of new Ilyushin aircraft. In November 1960, a small heliport was built beside Leningradsky Prospekt on the perimeter of the old airport for use by Aeroflot. When the new Moscow air terminal opened, helicopter operations were transferred there.

=== Closure ===
Khodynka Aerodrome closed in 2003, and as of 2016 the whole site has been redeveloped for other uses. It housed a large number of stored aircraft from Sukhoi and Mikoyan-Gurevich, which were moved to Lukhovitsy.

== Accidents and incidents ==
- On 18 May 1935, the Maxim Gorky (with pilots I. V. Mikheyev and I. S. Zhurov) and three more aircraft (a Tupolev ANT-14, R-5 and I-5) took off for a demonstration flight over Moscow. The main purpose of the other three aircraft flying so close was to make evident the difference in size. The accompanying I-5 biplane piloted by Nikolai Blagin had performed two loop manoeuvres around the Maxim Gorky. On the third loop, they collided. The Maxim Gorky crashed into a low-rise residential neighbourhood west of present-day Sokol metro station. Forty-five people were killed in the crash, including the fighter pilot as well as both crew members and the 33 passengers on the Maxim Gorky, and an additional nine people on the ground.
- On 26 June 1958, a prototype Antonov An-12 incurred heavy damage as the demonstration flight ground looped at the time of landing in Khodynka Aerodrome, Russia. The status of the aircraft is unknown.

== See also ==
- List of airports in Russia
