= Dinamo (Moscow Metro) =

Moscow Metro station

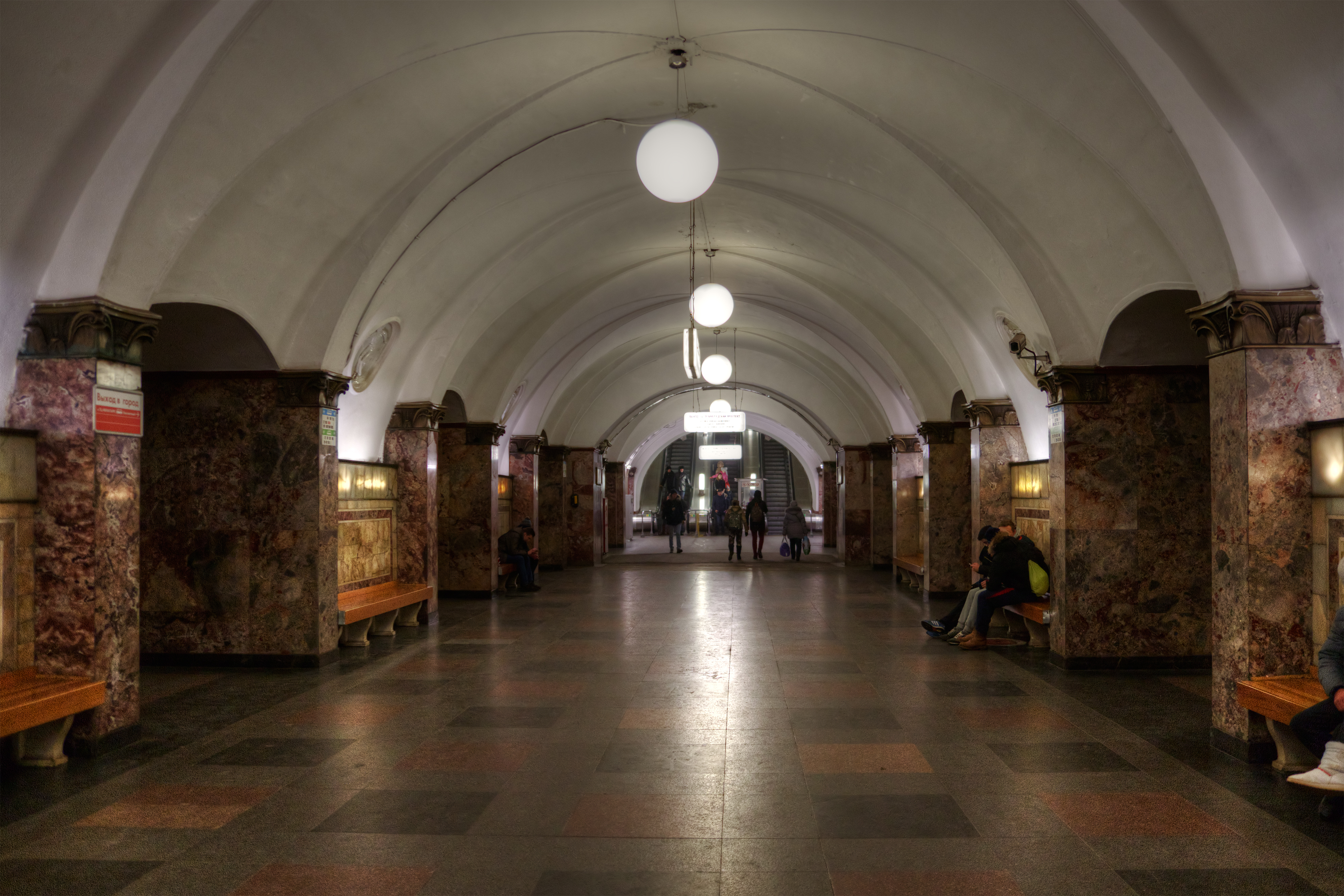

General information
- Location: Aeroport District; Northern Administrative Okrug; Moscow; Russia
- Coordinates: 55.7897°N 37.5580°E
- System: Moscow Metro station
- Owner: Moskovsky Metropoliten
- Line: Zamoskvoretskaya line
- Platforms: 1 island platform
- Tracks: 2
- Connections: Bus: 84, 105, 105k, 110, 207, 692; Trolleybus: 12, 29, 42, 70, 82, 86

Construction
- Depth: 39.6 metres (130 ft)
- Platform levels: 1
- Parking: No

Other information
- Station code: 036

History
- Opened: 11 September 1938; 87 years ago

Passengers
- 2002: 21,808,750

Services
Preceding station	Moscow Metro	Following station
Aeroport towards Khovrino	Zamoskvoretskaya line	Belorusskaya towards Alma-Atinskaya
CSKA anticlockwise / outer	Bolshaya Koltsevaya line transfer at Petrovsky Park	Savyolovskaya clockwise / inner
Route map
Location
- Location within Moscow Metro

Dinamo (Russian: Дина́мо) is a Moscow Metro station on the Zamoskvoretskaya line. It opened on 11 September 1938 as part of the second stage of the system. It was named for the former Dinamo Stadium, the home stadium of FC Dynamo Moscow. Passengers may transfer directly to the Bolshaya Koltsevaya line via Petrovsky Park station.

It was the deepest station in Moscow Metro from 1938 until 1944.

== Location ==
Dinamo is under Leningradsky Avenue in the Aeroport District of Moscow near Petrovsky Park and the Petrovsky Palace. The VTB Arena was built on the same site and Dinamo Stadium adjacent to the station.

== Design and layout ==
The station is situated at a depth of 39.6 metres (130 ft) and follows a tri-vaulted deep-level pylon design. Designed by Yakov Lichtenberg (ru) and Yury Revkovsky, the station features a sport-themed decoration with bas-reliefs designed by Elena Janson-Manizer (ru). Yason-Manzer depicting sportsmen in various practices in the vestibules and the central hall.

The pylons, faced with red tagilian marble and onyx have porcelain medallions also showing sportsmen. The walls are faced with onyx, white and grey marble, neatly tiled together. The floor is revetted with black marble, although the platforms were initially covered with asphalt.

There are two identical vestibules, each on the northern side of the Leningradsky Avenue, and the architect for the vestibules was Dmitry Chechulin.

There is an underground walkway between Dinamo and Petrovsky Park stations that eased transfers between the stations. That walkway opened on 29 December 2020.

== Scientific use ==
In 1940, physicists Georgy Flyorov and Konstantin Petrzhak used the station for their observations of the decay of uranium. The depth of the station reduced the potential effect of cosmic rays in their work. Working at night, the pair discovered spontaneous fission.

== Gallery ==
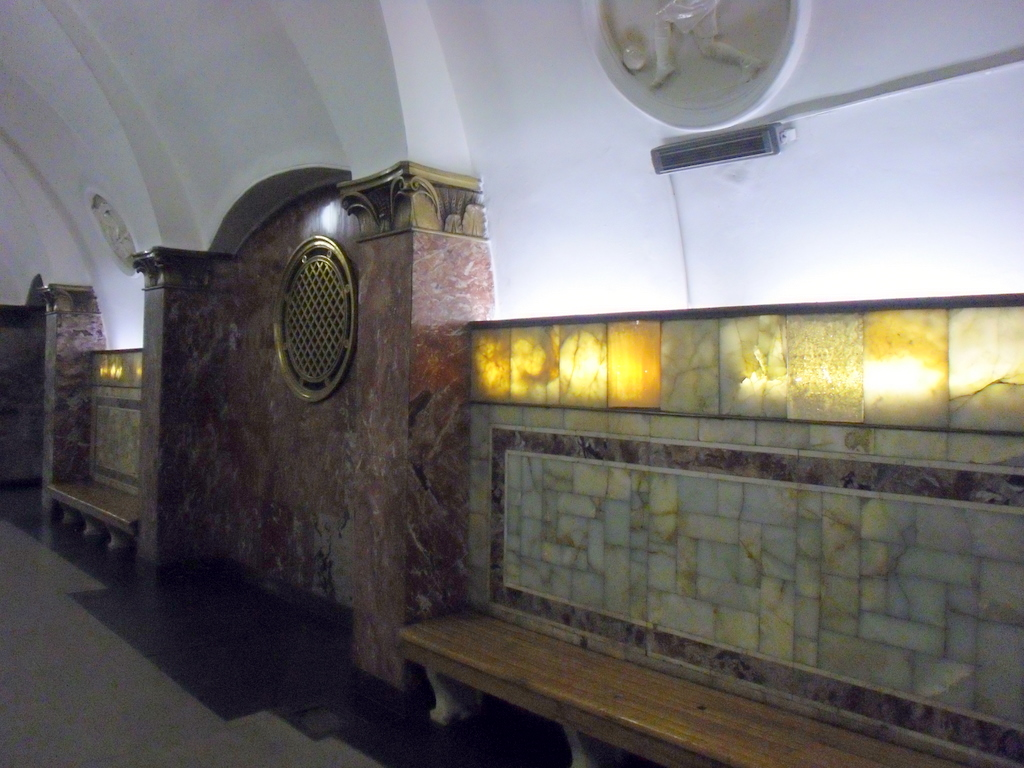
Pylon view

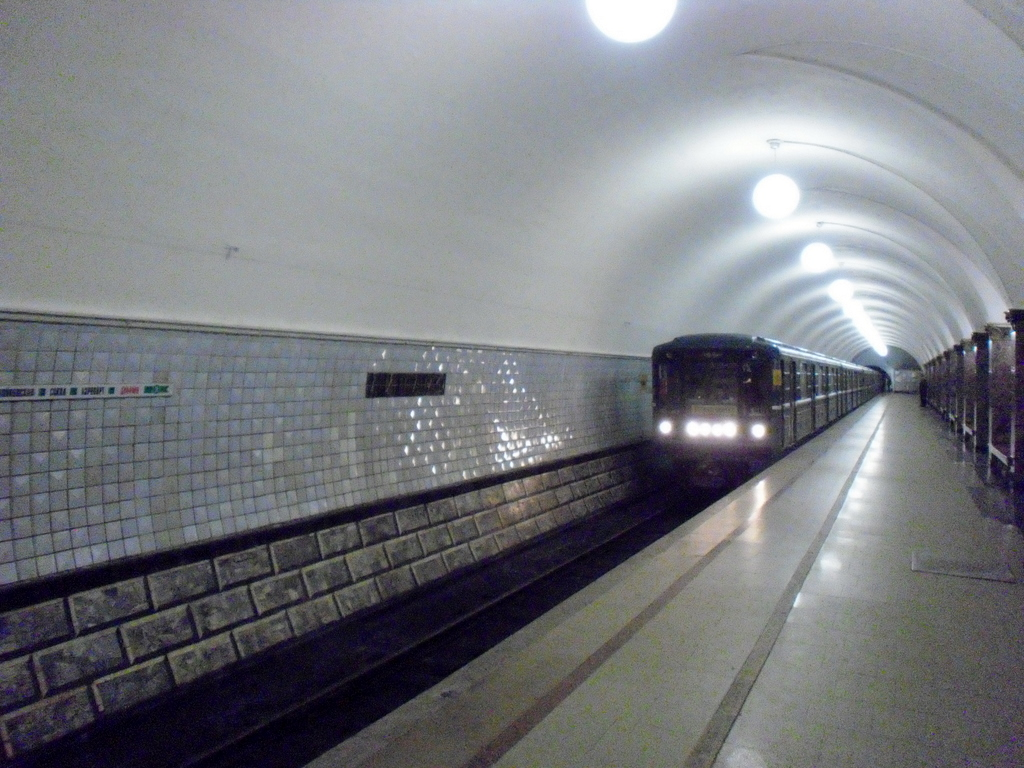
Platform view
