= Alexander Bashilov =

Russian military commander (1777–1847)

- Александр Александрович Башилов
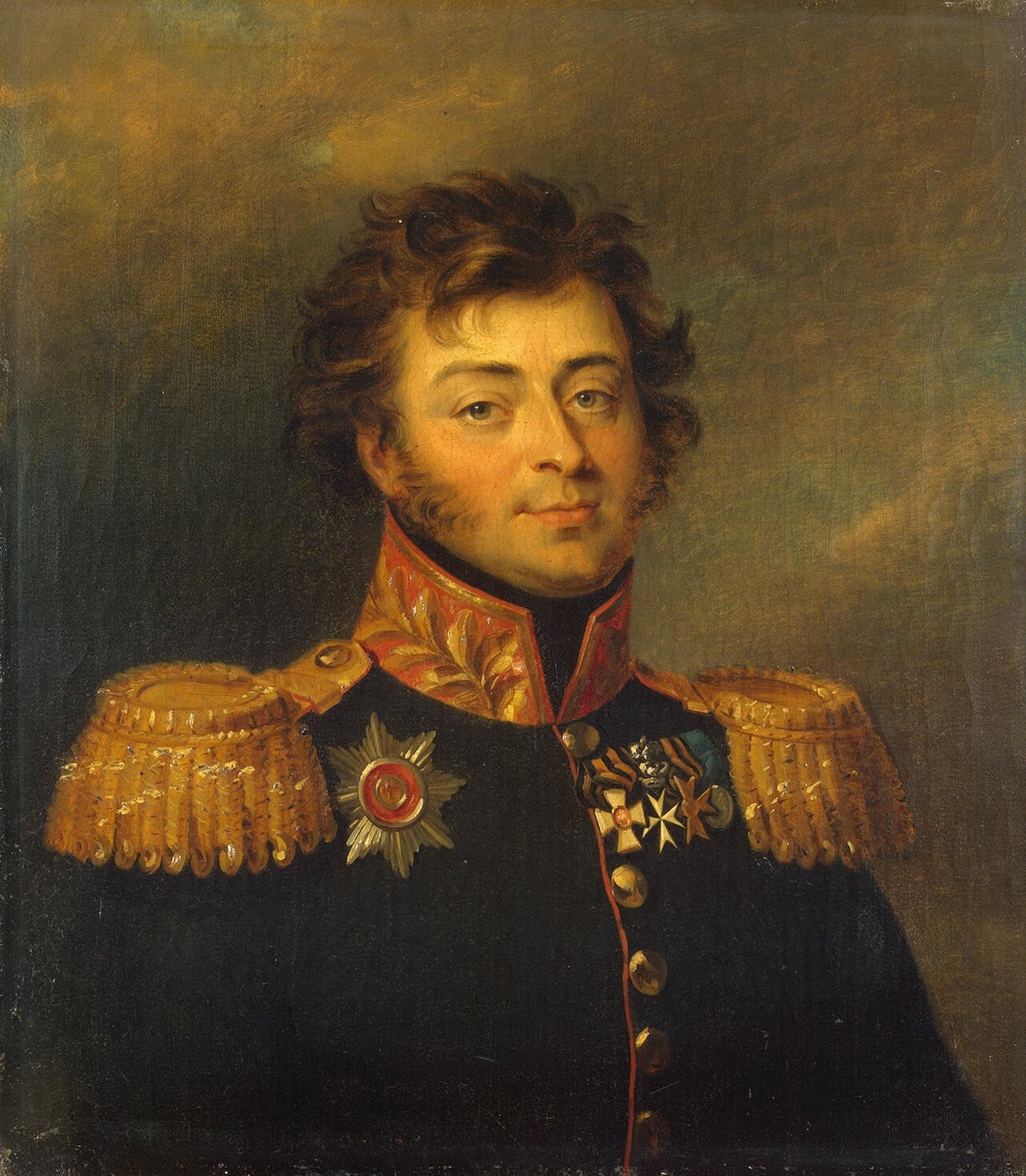
- Portrait by George Dawe (date unknown)
- Born: August 31, 1777; Hlukhiv
- Died: December 31, 1847 (aged 70); Moscow
- Burial place: Vagankovo Cemetery
- Military career
- Allegiance: Russian
- Rank: General Officer
- Unit: Preobrazhensky regiment
- Commands: Tambov regiment
- Conflicts: Napoleonic Wars
- Other work: Urban planning

Alexander Alexandrovich Bashilov (Russian: Алекса́ндр Алекса́ндрович Баши́лов; August 31, 1777, in Hlukhiv – December 31, 1847, in Moscow) was a Russian general officer of Napoleonic Wars period, later engaged in urban planning of Moscow and its suburbs.

== Military career ==
Alexander Bashilov, commissioned on graduation from the Page Corps, joined the elite Preobrazhensky regiment in January 1798. An aide to Paul I of Russia, he quickly rose to the rank of colonel in October 1800. In February 1802 he was stripped of his court titles for "indecent behaviour in a theatre" and transferred to a second-rate infantry regiment. He retired in November 1803 but returned to active service as a commanding officer of Tambov regiment in 1806.

Bashilov was involved in four campaigns:

- 1807 - Regimental commander against the French during War of the Fourth Coalition
- 1809 - Brigade commander in Galician and Bulgarian campaign against the Turks during Russo-Turkish War (1806–1812), notably the siege of Pazardzhik. Promoted to General Major in June 1810
- 1812 - Brigade commander against the French during French invasion of Russia. Assigned to Alexander Tormasov's Observation Army, was engaged in defensive action at Kobryn and Gorodechna (July 31, 1812), earning Order of St. George, fourth class for the latter.
- 1813 - Siege of Toruń. Bashilov, wounded, retired from the Army in May, 1813 for health reasons.

== Urban planner ==
In 1825, Bashilov returned to state service in the office of Governor of Moscow; during Russo-Turkish War (1828–1829) he also had a temporary assignment in Army logistics. In 1830–1832, Bashilov headed the Building Commission of Moscow (Комиссия строений в Москве).

Bashilov joined the city administration at the time when Moscow was still recovering from the destruction of Fire of 1812. He is remembered for planting the park around Petrovsky Palace (then a distant north-western suburb) and planning the regular city grid along Petersburg Highway (present-day Leningradsky Prospekt) and north from the Palace (present-day Savyolovsky District). This grid mostly survives to day, including Bashilovskaya and Novaya Bashilovka streets. Bashilov owned a house on Petersburg Highway and rented it to the operators of the famous Yar restaurant; the highway soon became an upper-class recreation area, while the Bashilovka outskirts remained a working-class area.

Bashilov and his son Alexander (1807–1854) were buried at lot 14 of Vagankovo Cemetery. Bashilov wrote a book of memoirs about reign of Paul I, printed in posthumously in 1871.
