= Aeroport District =

Aeroport District Район Аэропорт (Russian)
- District
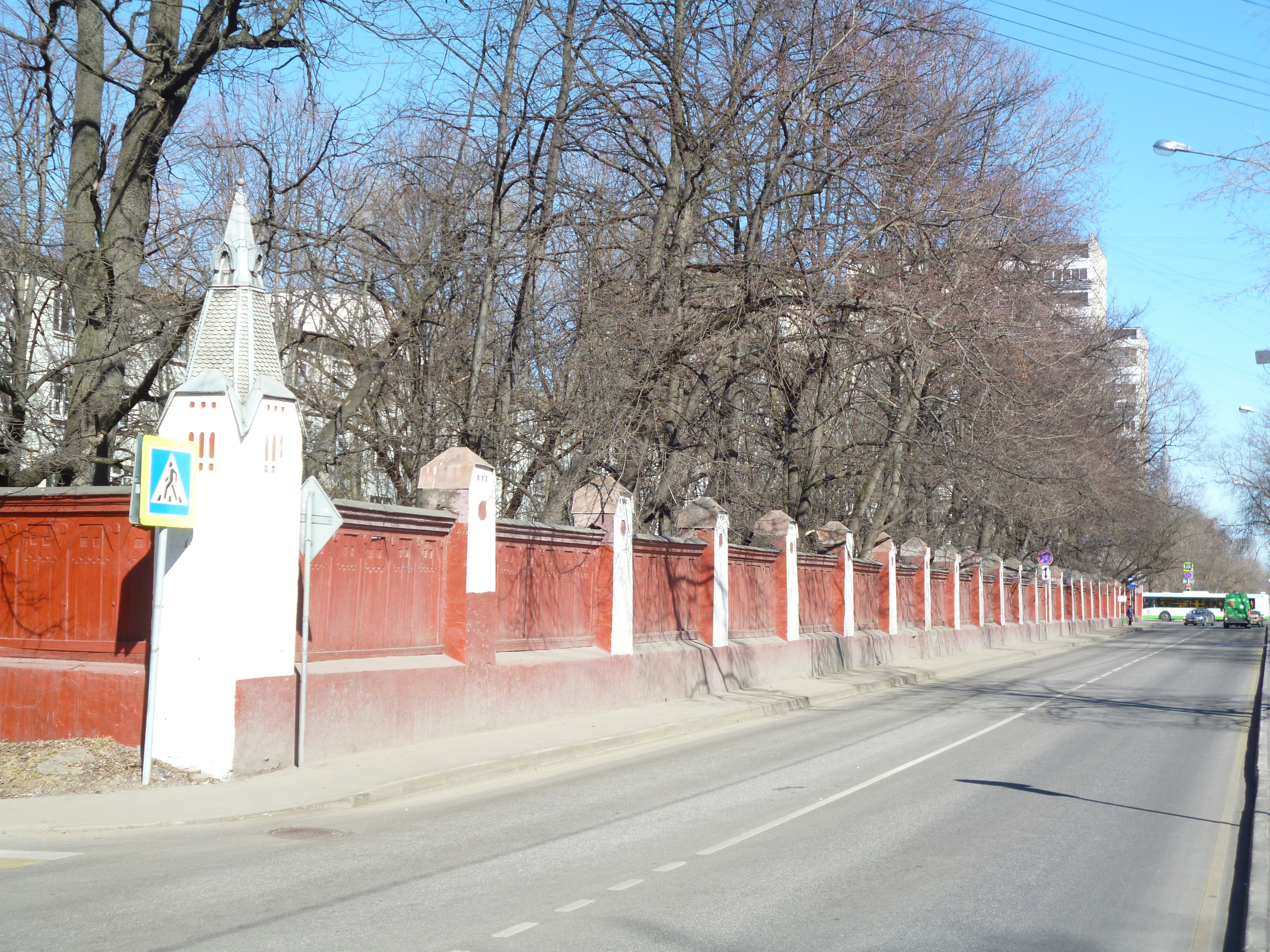
- Fenced garden of hospital for wounded soldiers, Aeroport District

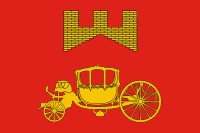
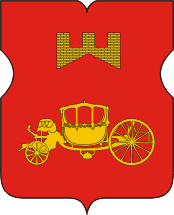
- Flag Coat of arms
- Location of Aeroport District on the map of Moscow
- Coordinates: 55°47′29″N 37°33′34″E
- Country: Russia
- Federal subject: Moscow

Area
  - Total: 4.58 km^{2} (1.77 sq mi)
- Time zone: UTC+
- OKTMO ID: 45333000
- Website: https://aeroport.mos.ru/

Aeroport District (Russian: райо́н Аэропо́рт, rayon Aeroport, "Airport District") is an administrative district (raion) of the Northern Administrative Okrug and one of the 125 raions of Moscow, Russia. The area of the district is 4.58 square kilometers (1.77 sq mi).

The district is named for the Khodynka Aerodrome, which closed in 2003. The Aeroport Metro Station opened in the district in 1938.

== Economy ==
The aviation companies Irkut, Ilyushin, and Yakovlev have their head offices in the district.

== Social Sphere ==
=== Education ===
Moscow Automobile and Road Construction State Technical University is located in the district.

The New Humanitarian School, a private school, is in the district.

=== Culture ===
Petrovsky Palace is located here.

=== Sports ===
Central Dynamo Stadium was located in the district, until its destruction and replacement with VTB Arena.

== See also ==
- Administrative divisions of Moscow
- Khodynka Aerodrome
- Aeroport (Moscow Metro)
