= Serebryany Bor =

Serebryany Bor (Russian: Серебряный Бор) is the name of several inhabited localities in Russia.

Urban localities

- Serebryany Bor, Sakha Republic, an urban-type settlement in Neryungrinsky District of the Sakha Republic

Rural localities

- Serebryany Bor, Saratov Oblast, a settlement in Rovensky District of Saratov Oblast
