= Sokol (Moscow Metro) =

Moscow Metro station

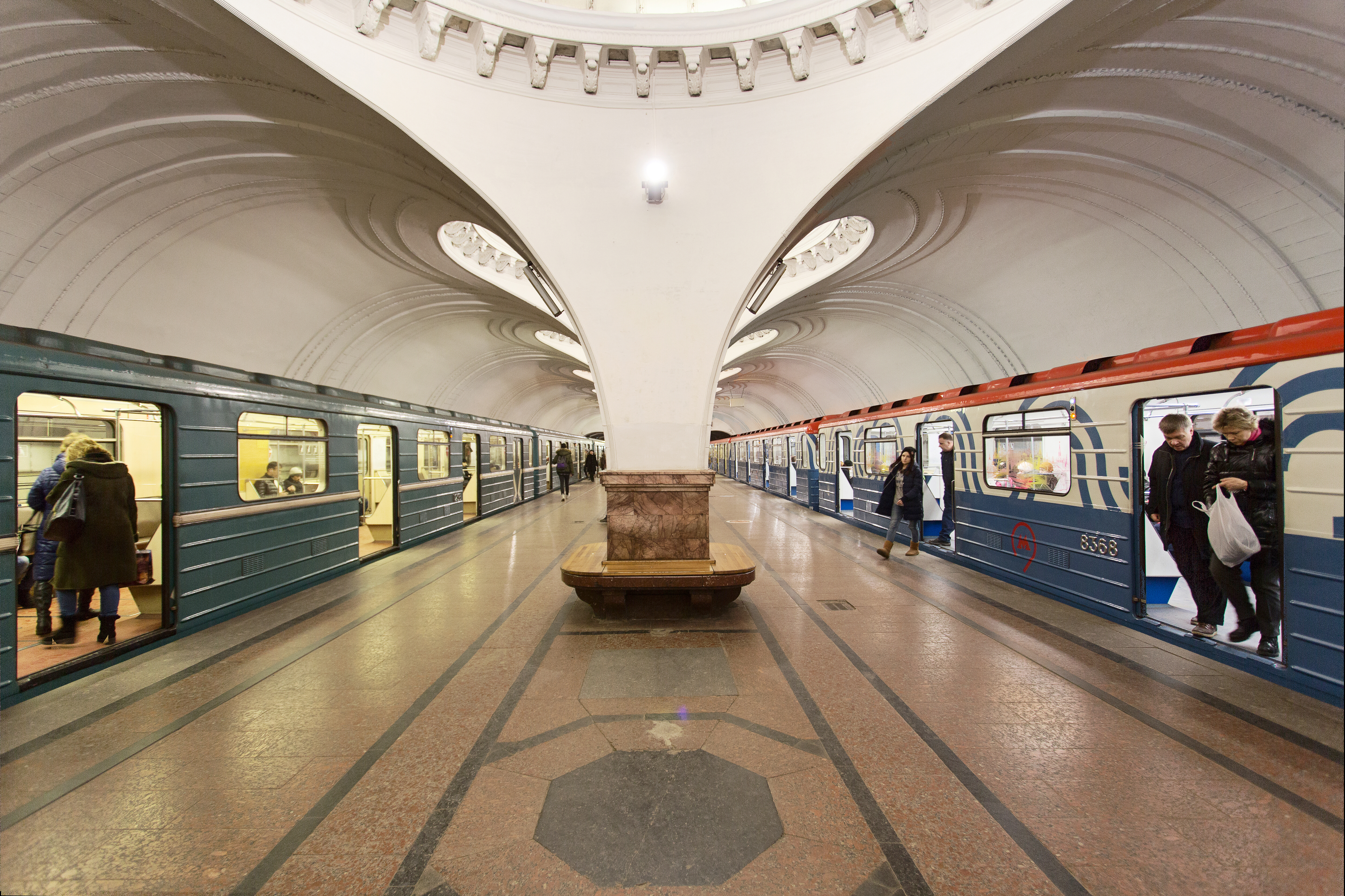

General information
- Location: Sokol District; Aeroport District; Northern Administrative Okrug; Moscow; Russia
- Coordinates: 55.8051°N 37.5153°E
- System: Moscow Metro station
- Owner: Moskovsky Metropoliten
- Line: Zamoskvoretskaya line
- Platforms: 1 island platform
- Tracks: 2
- Connections: Bus: 26, 100, 105, 175, 691; Trolleybus: 6, 12, 19, 43, 59, 61, 70, 82, 86

Construction
- Depth: 9.6 metres (31 ft)
- Platform levels: 1
- Parking: No

Other information
- Station code: 038

History
- Opened: 11 September 1938; 87 years ago

Passengers
- 2002: 31,572,500

Services
Preceding station	Moscow Metro	Following station
Voykovskaya towards Khovrino	Zamoskvoretskaya line	Aeroport towards Alma-Atinskaya
Route map
Location
- Location within Moscow Metro

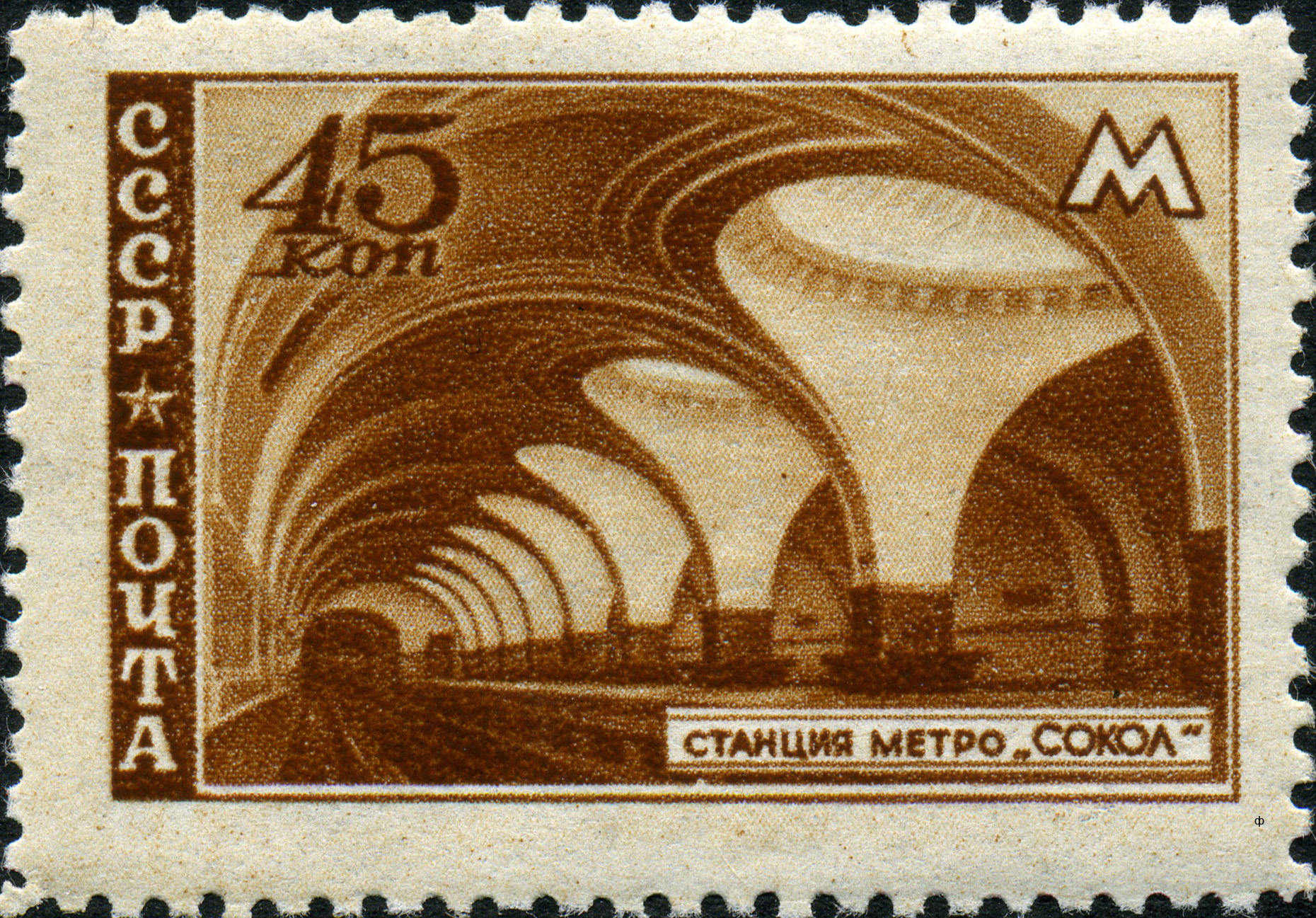
Sokol station depicted on a 1947 USSR postage stamp

Sokol (Russian: Со́кол, English: Falcon) is a Moscow Metro station on the Zamoskvoretskaya Line. The station opened on 11 September 1938. Designed by K. Yakovlev, V. Polikarpova, and V. Andreev, it features a single row of pillars which flare upward into the arched ceiling, separated by circular coffers. Sokol is finished in a variety of materials, including white and gray Koyelga marble, onyx, granite, and white ceramic tile. The two entrances to the station are located on both sides of Leningradsky Prospekt. An additional exit to the underpass is available from the south end of the platform. Another entrance was cut in 2003 from the nearby Metro Market shopping center. It was the northwestern terminus of the line until 1964 when 3 northern stations were opened. A Zamoskvoretskaya Line depot is located near the station.

== Name ==
The station is named after the Sokol cooperative settlement (built in the 1920s) that also gave name to the Sokol District.

== Accidents ==
On 19 March 2006, a section of tunnel between Sokol and Voykovskaya stations collapsed and fell onto a metro train. It was reported that the accident was due to workers setting up an advertising billboard in the street above the tunnel. Despite a concrete slab piercing one of the carriages the accident did not cause any injuries.
