= CSKA (Moscow Metro) =

Moscow Metro station

CSKA ЦСКА
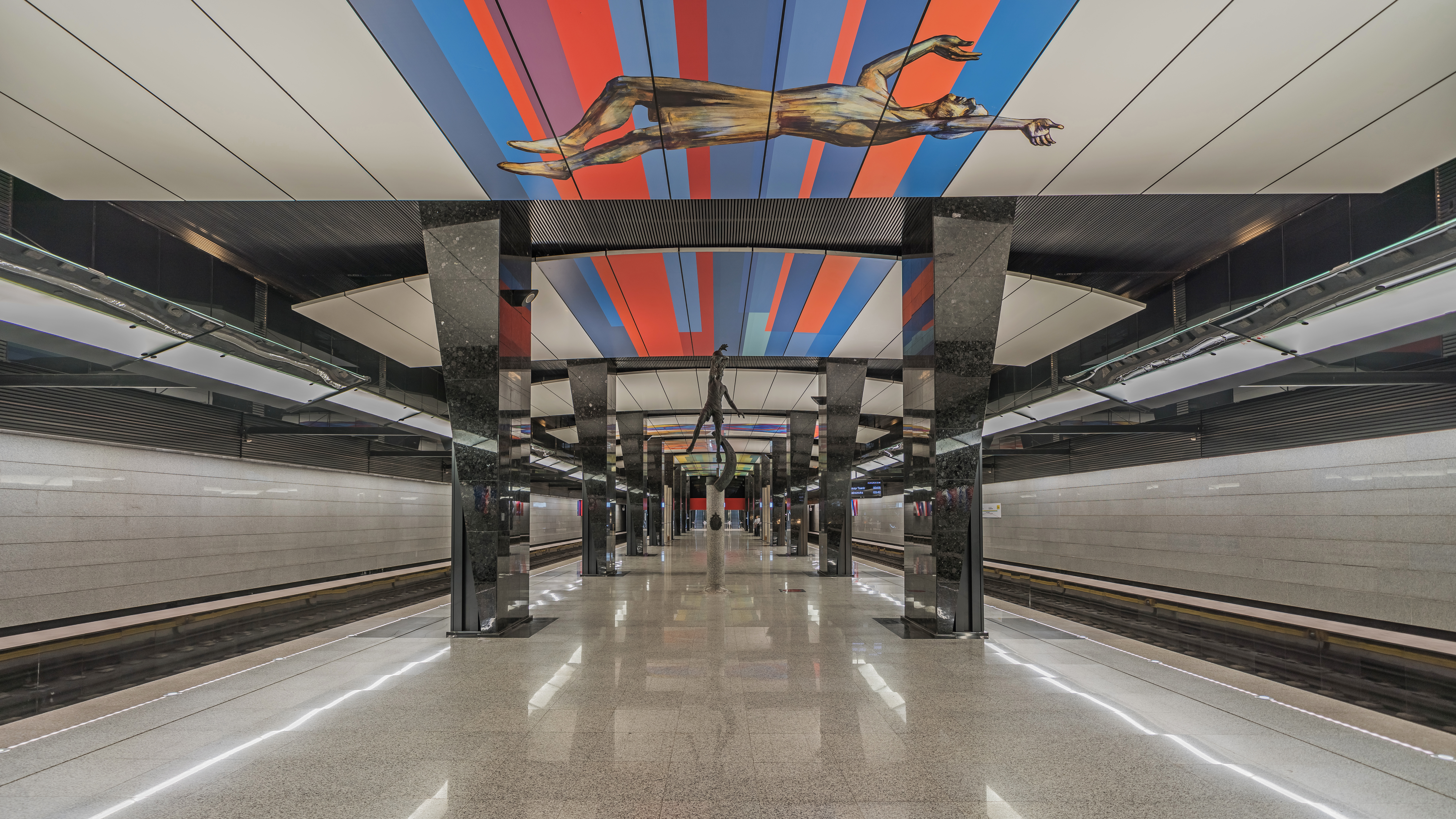

General information
- Location: Khoroshyovsky District, Northern Administrative Okrug; Moscow; Russia
- Coordinates: 55.7866°N 37.5333°E
- System: Moscow Metro station
- Owner: Moskovsky Metropoliten
- Line: Bolshaya Koltsevaya line
- Platforms: 1 island platform
- Tracks: 2

Construction
- Structure type: Shallow column station
- Depth: 28 metres (92 ft)
- Platform levels: 1

History
- Opened: 26 February 2018

Services
Preceding station	Moscow Metro	Following station
Khoroshyovskaya anticlockwise / outer	Bolshaya Koltsevaya line	Petrovsky Park clockwise / inner
Route map
Bolshaya Koltsevaya line
Location
- Location within Moscow Metro

CSKA (Russian: ЦСКА) is a station on the Bolshaya Koltsevaya line of the Moscow Metro. It opened on 26 February 2018 as one of five initial stations on the new line.

Passengers can make out-of-station transfers to Zorge on the Moscow Central Circle Line. The Metro plans to build a walkway between the stations which would make the connection time about 20 minutes.

== Name ==
The original name of the station was slated to be Khodynskoe Pole, after the open area where the station is located; however, fans of CSKA Moscow requested that the station be renamed “CSKA” after the sports clubs whose facilities are nearby. In April 2016, the Mayor of Moscow, Sergey Sobyanin issued a decree to rename the station. To further recognize CSKA, the station lobby includes sculptures of well-known CSKA athletes across the club's three major sports: Vsevolod Bobrov, Denis Denisov, and Victor Khryapa.
