= Petrovsky Palace =

Historic palace in Moscow, Russia

Coordinates: 55.7935°N 37.5521°E

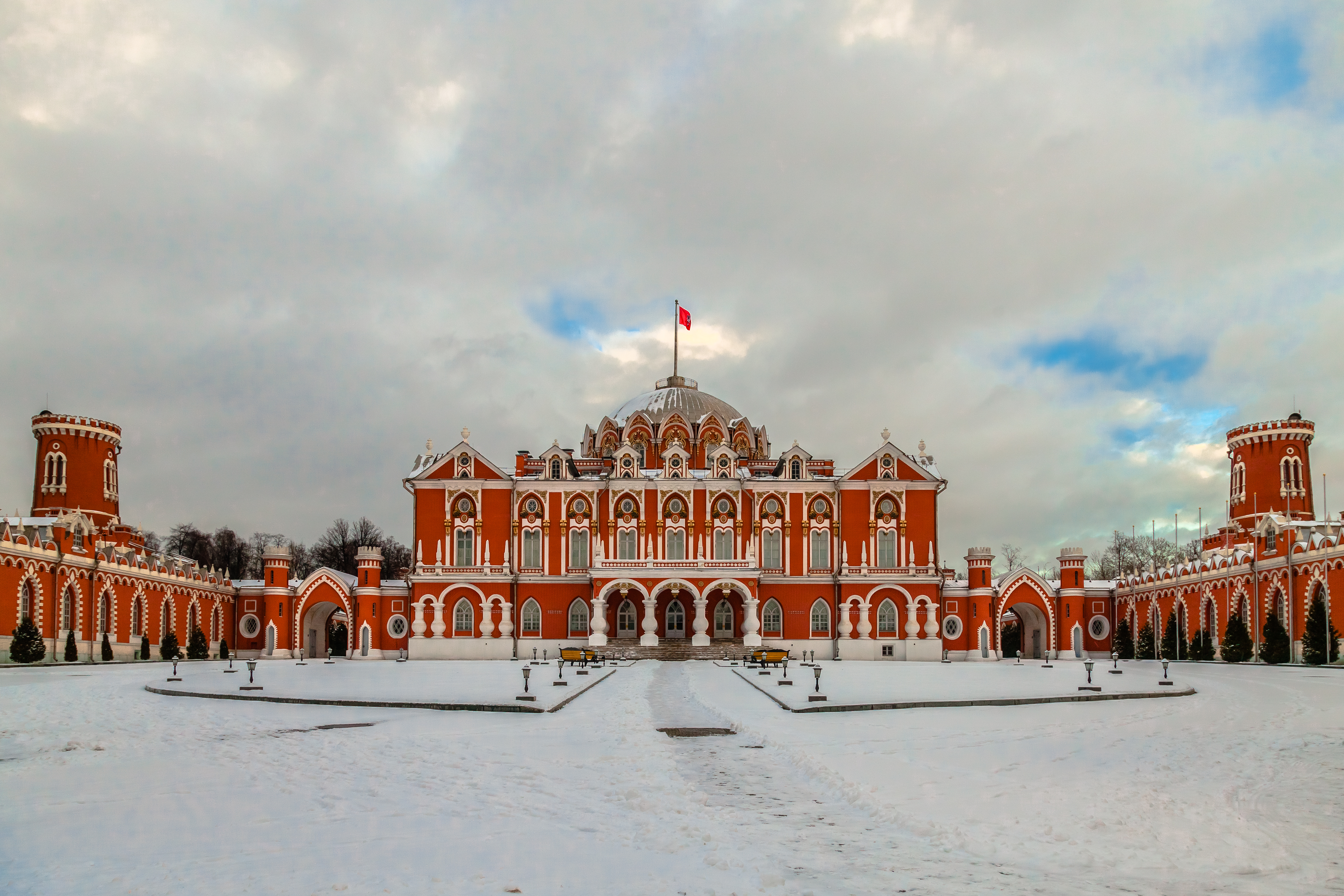
Petrovsky Palace

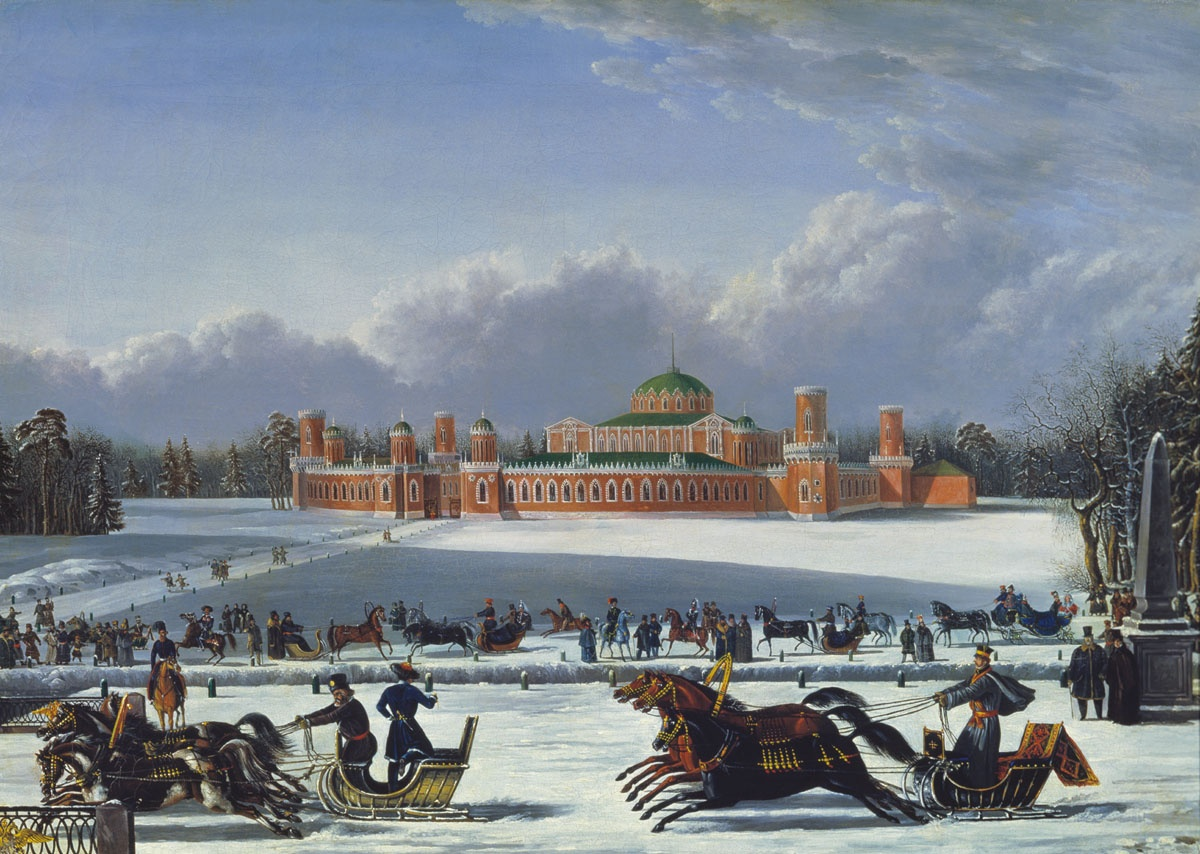
Petrovsky Palace

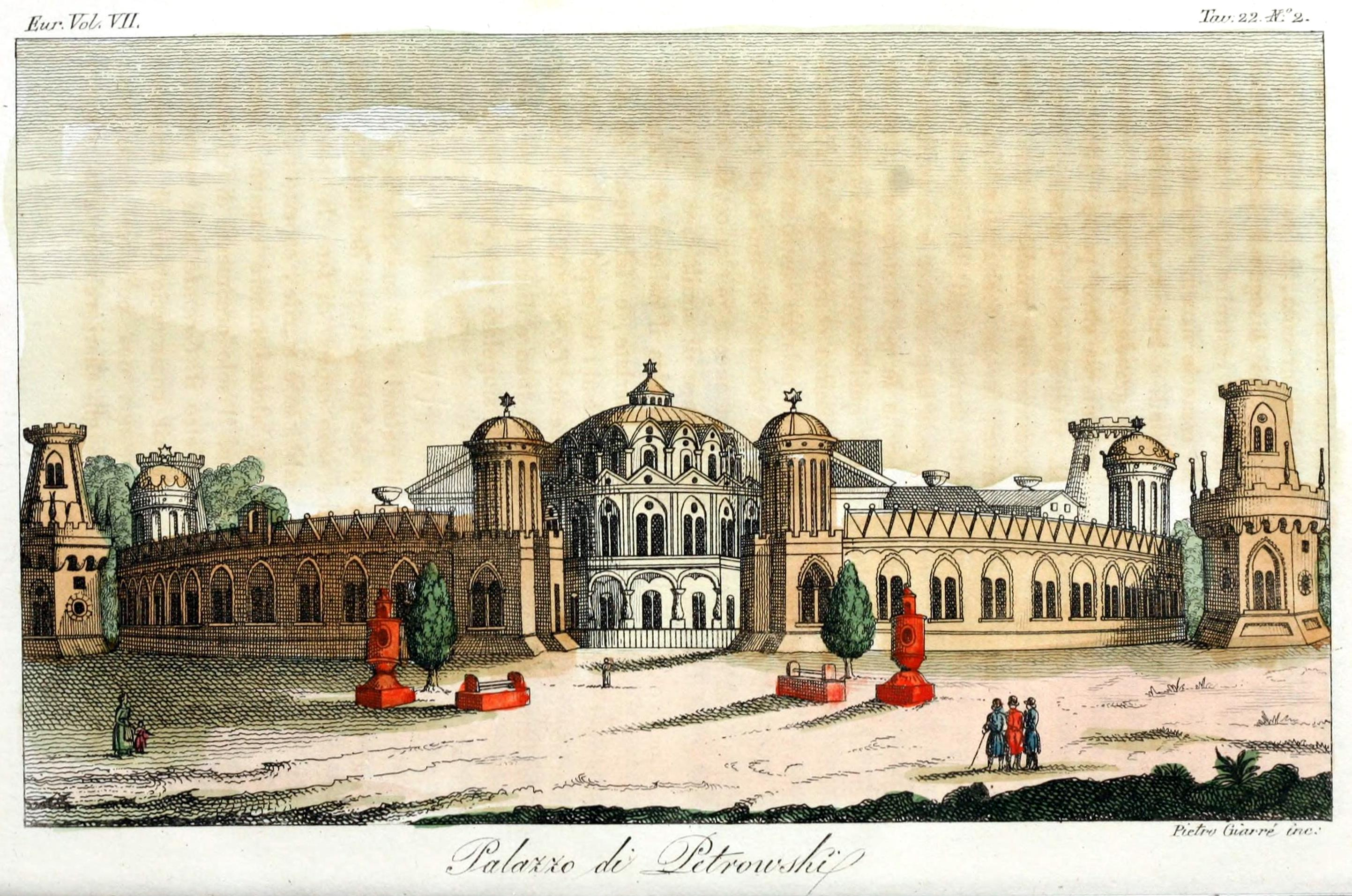
Petrovsky Palace (1831)

Petrovsky Palace or Petroff Palace, is a palace located in Moscow on Leningradsky Prospect. It was founded in 1780 under the orders of Catherine the Great.

== History ==
=== Construction ===
In the 1770s Catherine the Great decided to build a new palace to be used for short stopovers en route from St Petersburg to Moscow. Apart from being of practical use, the erection of the Petrovsky Palace also had a symbolical nature and was connected with Russia's victory in the Russian-Turkish War and with the signing of the Treaty of Kucuk-Kainarji. Construction management was entrusted to Vasily Bazhenov but was soon handed over to Matvey Kazakov.

Thanks to the activity of the chief architect, the work was completed in a relatively short time – the main construction work was completed in 1779 and the interior decoration in 1783. The speed of construction was also evidenced by the architect's project drawings, which depict the palace in the process of an erection and which differ in many details from the actual building. According to the surviving plans, the palace was supposed to have more decorations. Despite these differences, no significant changes were made to the original composition.

Catherine II stayed at the palace only twice: in 1785 she spent four days there on her way from Novgorod and ten days on her way from the Crimea in 1787. After Paul I, Russian monarchs used the Petrovsky Palace as the last stop on their way to the coronation in the Kremlin.

=== After the Russian Revolution ===
In July 1920, at the insistence of the People's Commissar of Education Anatoly Lunacharsky, the complex was transferred to the Soviet Air Forces:

Taking into account the vast future that awaits aviation, I consider it highly expedient to transfer the Petrovsky Palace to the control of the air fleet, especially since, according to my information, this palace has been brought almost completely unfit for habitation and is hardly rational is now in use. Aviaflot could bring this building into a residential state. It is not difficult to agree on permanent monitoring by your department of the building, which in no case would allow damage to it, as a historical and artistic monument. <...> I would strongly insist on the need to dispose of the palace for this very purpose.

In 1923, the Academy of the Air Fleet named after N. E. Zhukovsky moved into the palace, and began a comprehensive reconstruction of the building for her own needs, and the name was changed to the Palace of "Red Aviation". The canteen was reopened in the main building of the palace, administration offices and a library were also arranged, the left wing was given to the printing house, the right wing was converted into a laboratory, and the academy workers were placed in the outbuildings. If the main halls of the first floor have partially preserved architectural decoration, the second and third have been completely redesigned. For example, there was a ventilation pipe stretched through the facade, ceilings were replaced in the left wing, and a fuel tank and a coal pit appeared in the right wing. In the autumn of 1941, the headquarters of Long Range Aviation and the Air Defense Forces were based in the building.

Currently, Petrovsky Palace is part of Moscow's city limits and the nearest metro station to it is Dynamo. Since 1997, the palace has been under the jurisdiction of the city administration. In 1998, at the initiative of Moscow mayor Yury Luzhkov, the palace was given back its former name – Petrovsky Palace. Because of the numerous transformations, only a few historical fragments have survived: the decoration of the Round Hall and the four vestibules, the main staircase, and some furniture. The palace has been undergoing renovation work since 1998. Since 2011, a hotel complex has been located on the first floor and wings of the palace, while the ground floor was given to the museum. The palace is also the official Reception House of the Moscow government.
