= Aeroport (Moscow Metro) =

Moscow Metro station

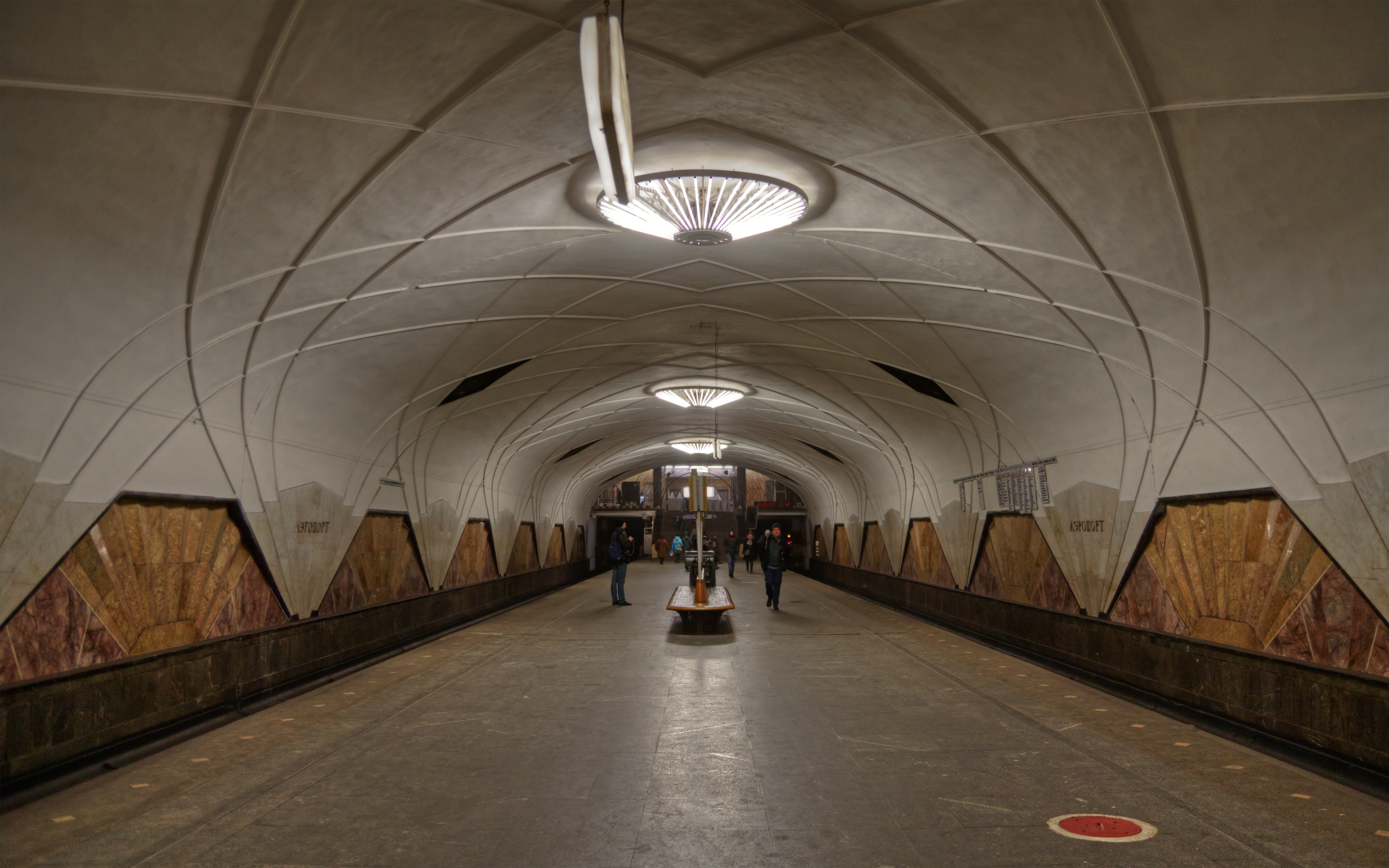

General information
- Location: Aeroport District; Khoroshyovsky District; Northern Administrative Okrug; Moscow; Russia
- Coordinates: 55.8003°N 37.5329°E
- System: Moscow Metro station
- Owner: Moskovsky Metropoliten
- Line: Zamoskvoretskaya line
- Platforms: 1 island platform
- Tracks: 2
- Connections: Bus: 905, 904, m1 Trolleybus: 6, 12, 43, 65, 70, 82, 86

Construction
- Depth: 8.6 metres (28 ft)
- Platform levels: 1
- Parking: No

Other information
- Station code: 037

History
- Opened: 11 September 1938; 87 years ago

Passengers
- 2002: 23,980,500

Services
Preceding station	Moscow Metro	Following station
Sokol towards Khovrino	Zamoskvoretskaya line	Dinamo towards Alma-Atinskaya
Route map
Location
- Location within Moscow Metro

Aeroport (Russian: Аэропорт, IPA: [aɪrɐˈport]) is a Moscow Metro station on the Zamoskvoretskaya Line. Its name, literally meaning airport, owes to the nearby Khodynka Aerodrome, Moscow's first airport, no longer in operation. Now, there is a bus terminal (Goraerovokzal, Гораэровокзал) which has regular service to Moscow's principal airports. Opened as part of the second stage on 11 September 1938, the station features a single-vault design. It was built using a cut-and cover method. Concrete segments of the vault were pre-cast and then lowered into the station.

Architects B. Vilensky and V. Yershov applied the aviation theme to this big open station, in what is seen as some of the best examples of Soviet Art Deco architecture. The most noticeable design feature is the network of intersecting ribs that fan out across the vaulted ceiling. These ribs originate from fan-shaped limestone panels spaced at regular intervals along the walls, which are red marble with shell-shaped brown marble insets. The floor is revetted with grey granite. Lighting comes from pyramidal objects which house luminescent lamps, although originally the station had chandeliers with normal tungsten bulbs.

The vestibule to the station is located on the north side of Leningradsky Avenue near the Viktorenko Street, and receives a daily passenger traffic of 59,800.

== Architecture and design ==
In the station's design, the architects tried to express the theme of Soviet aviation. The desire to convey the volume of the platform hall led to the choice of a single-vault station design, so the vault was built of monolithic reinforced concrete according to a special design. "Aeroport" was the first single-vaulted station of the Moscow Metro built by the open method.

Long narrow relief strips reminiscent of parachute slings pass through the station vault. They intersect with each other and give an additional feeling of space and lightness.

The lower part of the track walls is finished in black diabase. Above this is relief fan-shaped inserts lined with marble-like limestone and purple marble. The harmonious combination of materials of different colours and textures gives the track wall a particular decorative expressiveness.

Above the track walls, there are diamond-shaped cast-iron ventilation grilles. They are inscribed in the intersections of the "parachute slings". On the ceiling is a row of conical chandeliers for fluorescent lamps, giving evenly diffused light. The chandeliers originally consisted of semi-circular lamps fixed around a single spherical сeiling. However, they gave too little light and were, therefore, replaced.

The floor of the station is lined with grey granite. Originally, the platform was covered with asphalt, and a patterned walkway, made of marble, ran along its centre. There are five double-sided wooden benches in the centre of the station. Above their backs, there are information boards and signs.

The ends of the station hall are connected to the two vestibules by wide staircases passing through arches decorated with decorative metal grilles. Each vestibule has a rectangular shape. The upper part stands out with a circle on the ceiling which is supported by four onyx columns with many faces. The ceiling has an intricate stucco pattern. The walls of the ante-rooms are lined with dark yellow marble limestone; the pilasters are of black marble.

The vestibules are communicated by staircases with two lobbies facing Leningradsky Avenue. They are built into two residential buildings, built in 1938 (in 1954 the buildings were connected).
