= Domodedovskaya =

Moscow Metro station

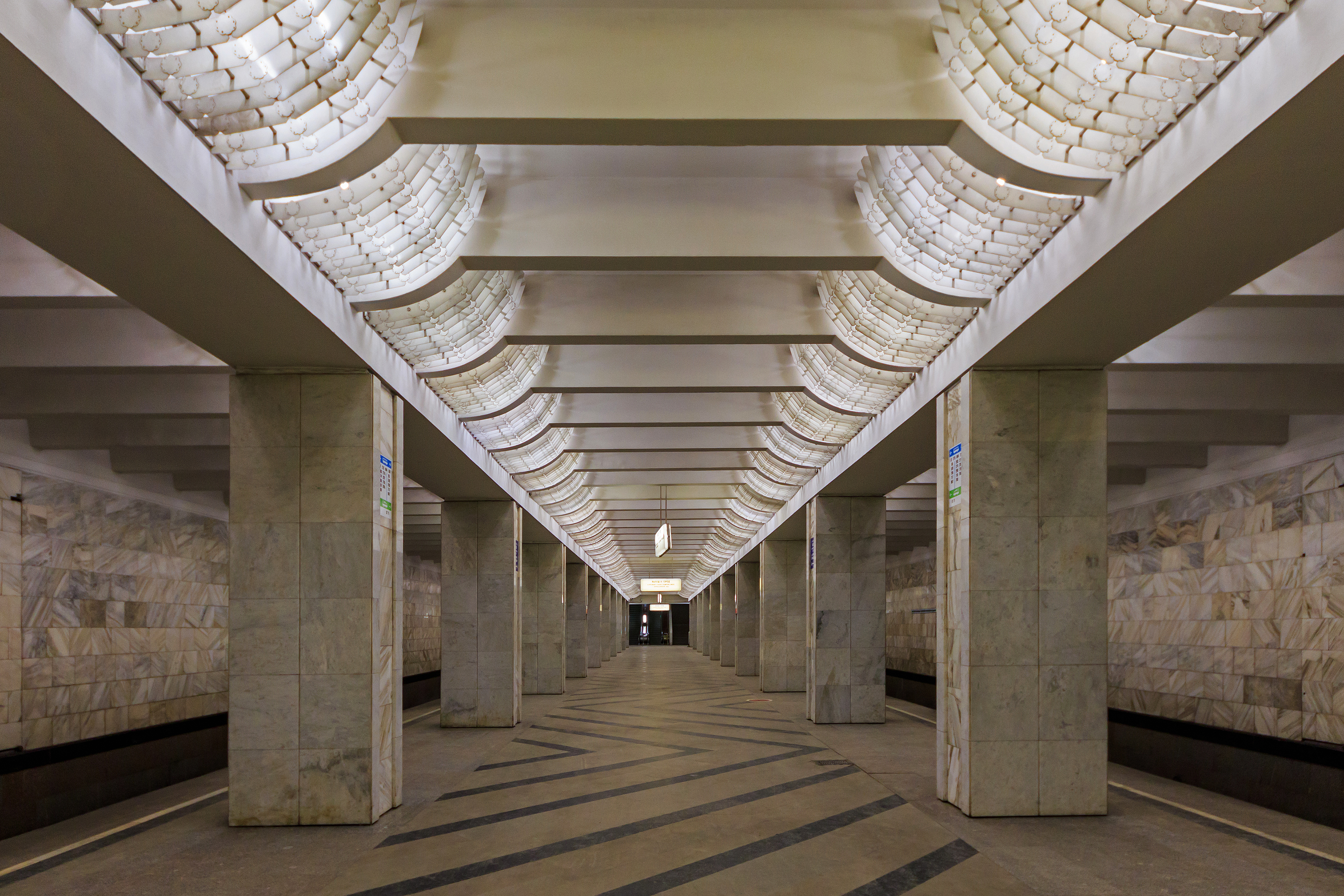

General information
- Location: Orekhovo-Borisovo Severnoye District; Orekhovo-Borisovo Yuzhnoye District; Southern Administrative Okrug; Moscow; Russia
- Coordinates: 55.6108°N 37.7186°E
- System: Moscow Metro station
- Owner: Moskovsky Metropoliten
- Line: Zamoskvoretskaya line
- Platforms: 1 island platform
- Tracks: 2
- Connections: Bus: м78, е85, с810, с819, 826, 828, 837, 858, 887, н5 (night bus); suburban routs: 308, 355, 356, 364, 367, 404, 439, 471, 496, 510, 593

Construction
- Structure type: Shallow column tri-vault
- Depth: 9.5 metres (31 ft)
- Platform levels: 1
- Parking: No

Other information
- Station code: 021

History
- Opened: 7 September 1985; 40 years ago

Passengers
- 2002: 27,995,500

Services
Preceding station	Moscow Metro	Following station
Orekhovo towards Khovrino	Zamoskvoretskaya line	Krasnogvardeyskaya towards Alma-Atinskaya
Route map
Location
- Location within Moscow Metro

Domodedovskaya (Russian: Домодедовская) is a Moscow Metro station in Orekhovo-Borisovo Severnoye and Orekhovo-Borisovo Yuzhnoye districts, Southern Administrative Okrug, Moscow. It is on the Zamoskvoretskaya Line, between Orekhovo and Krasnogvardeyskaya stations.

The station opened on 7 September 1985.

== Name ==
Domodedovskaya is named after Domodedovo International Airport, which is located some 15 kilometres (9.3 mi) to the south of the station along the Kashirskoye Highway.

On March 29, 2020 due to the coronavirus pandemic in Russia, the management of the Moscow Metro temporarily renamed the station to "DomaDedovskaya" (rus. ДомаДедовская) which refer to "Grandfather at home" to remind the citizen of Moscow to stay their elderly parents at home.

== Location ==
It located at the intersection of Kashirskoye Highway and Orekhovy Boulevard. There are also exits to General Belov street.

== Connection ==
There is a regular shuttle bus service from the station to Domodedovo, as Domodedovskaya provides the fastest ground access to the airport.

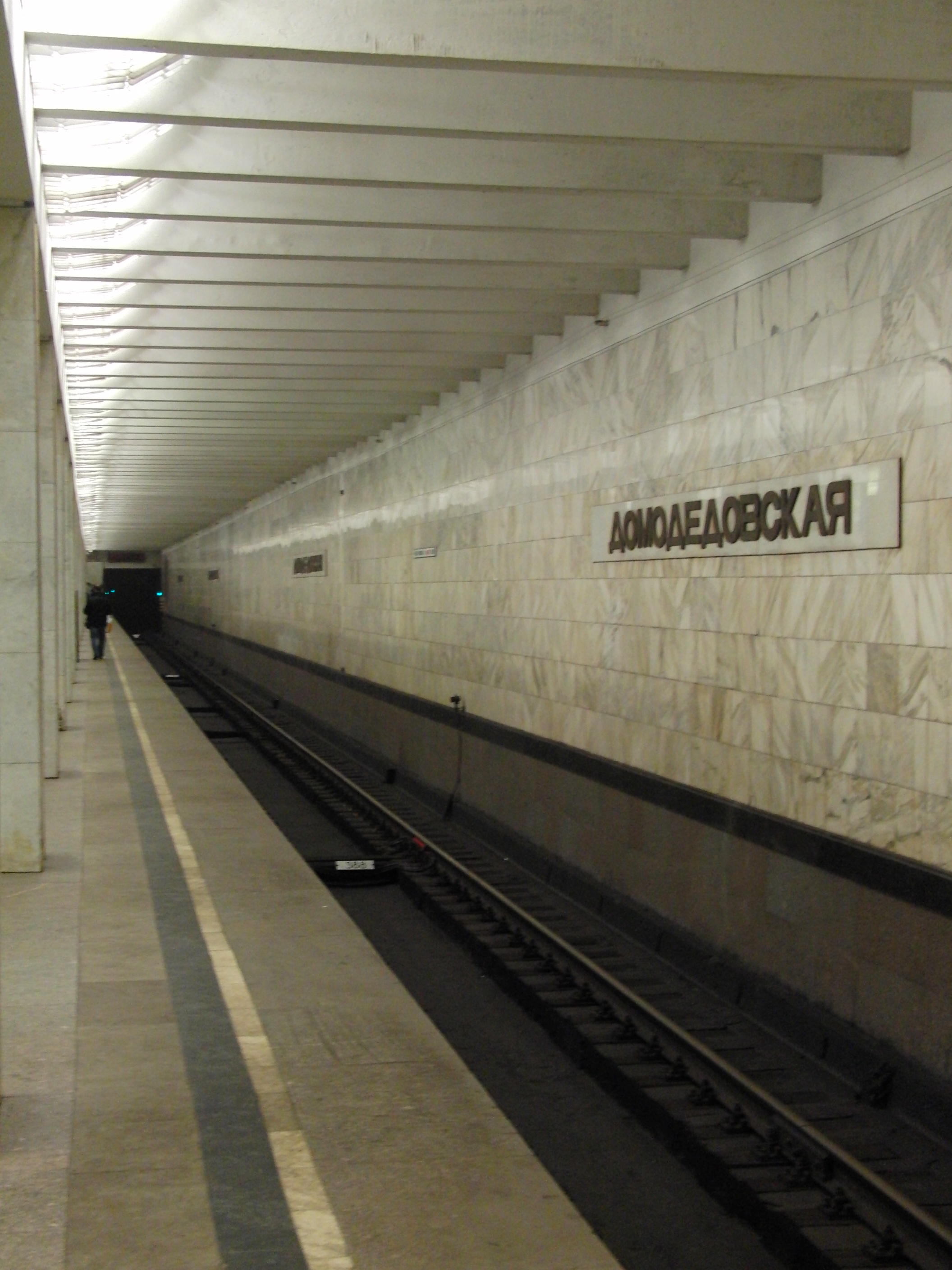
Station platform of Domodedovskaya

== Building ==
The station was designed by architects Nina A. Aleshina and N. Samoylova. Like many other stations built in the 1970s and 1980s, Domodedovskaya has a decorative theme related to the local surroundings. Appropriately enough, the theme here is aviation. The pillars are faced with white marble with inlays of darker marble, and the walls are decorated with plaques depicting Soviet aircraft.
