= Orekhovo (Moscow Metro) =

Moscow Metro station

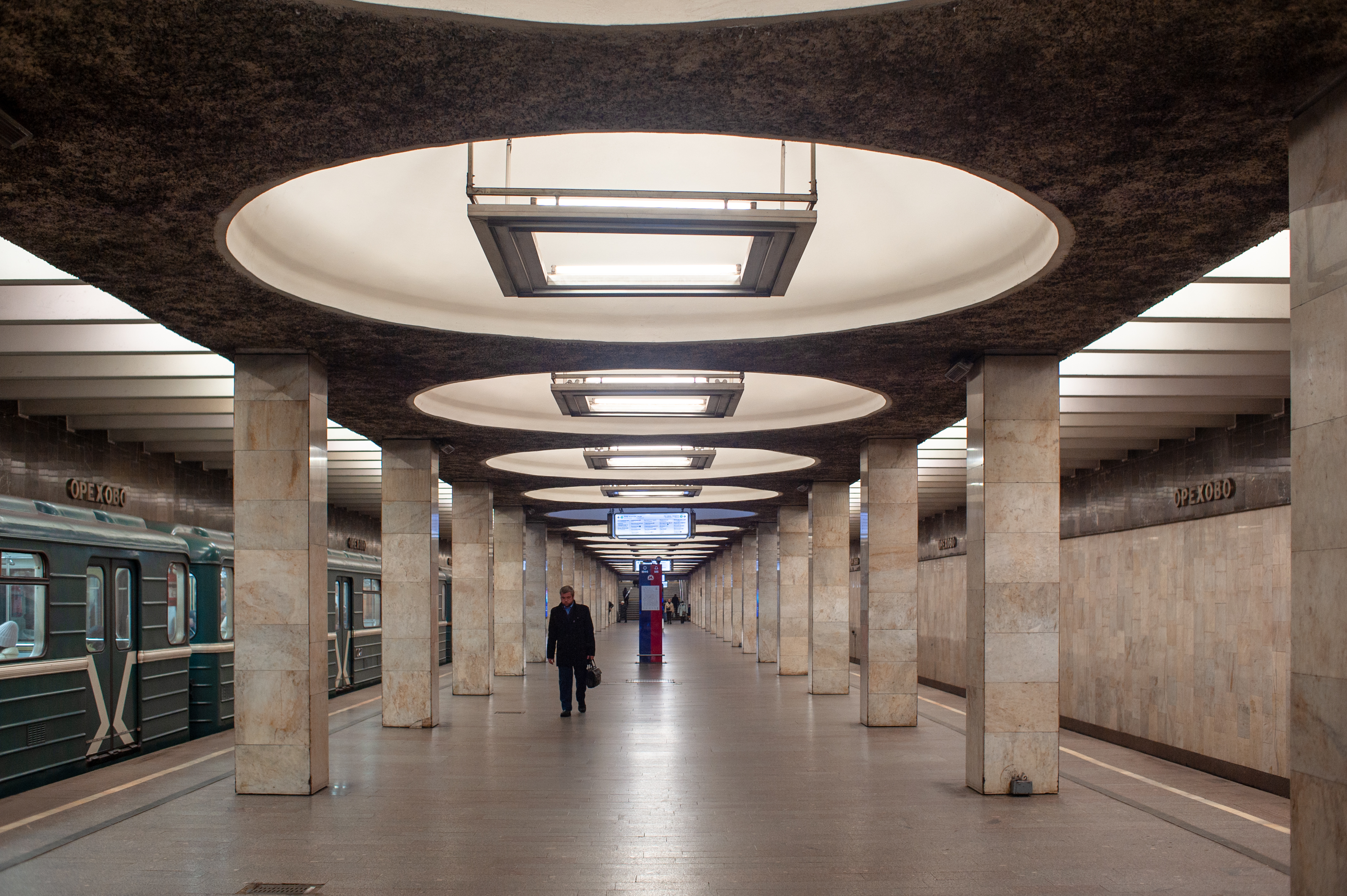

General information
- Location: Orekhovo-Borisovo Severnoye District; Southern Administrative Okrug; Moscow; Russia
- Coordinates: 55.6132°N 37.6949°E
- System: Moscow Metro station
- Owner: Moskovsky Metropoliten
- Line: Zamoskvoretskaya line
- Platforms: 1 island platform
- Tracks: 2
- Connections: Bus: м78, м83, 826, с854, 858, с894

Construction
- Structure type: Shallow column triple-vault
- Depth: 9 metres (30 ft)
- Platform levels: 1
- Parking: No

Other information
- Station code: 022

History
- Opened: 30 December 1984; 41 years ago
- Closed: 31 December 1984; 41 years ago
- Rebuilt: 9 February 1985; 41 years ago

Passengers
- 2002: 10,968,250

Services
| Preceding station | Moscow Metro | Following station |
|---|---|---|
| Tsaritsyno towards Khovrino | Zamoskvoretskaya line | Domodedovskaya towards Alma-Atinskaya |
Route map
Location
- Location within Moscow Metro

Orekhovo (Russian: Орехово) is a Moscow Metro station on the Zamoskvoretskaya Line in Orekhovo-Borisovo Severnoye District, Southern Administrative Okrug, Moscow. Entrances are situated on the edge of Tsaritsyno park, at the intersection of Shipilovsky drive and Bazhenova street.

Orekhovo opened on 30 December 1984 as part of an extension but was closed the very next day because of flooding. It reopened on 9 February 1985. From November 2022 to late May 2023, service between Avtozavodskaya and Orekhovo was suspended for tunnel reconstruction.

The station was designed by architects L. Popov, V. Volovich, and G. Mun. Both the walls and pillars are faced with white marble, and there is a cast bronze sculpture by L. Berlin (devoted to the theme "Protection of Nature") above the escalators. The entrances to the station are located between Shipilovsky drive and Bazhenova street, on the east side of Tsaritsino Park.

== Gallery ==
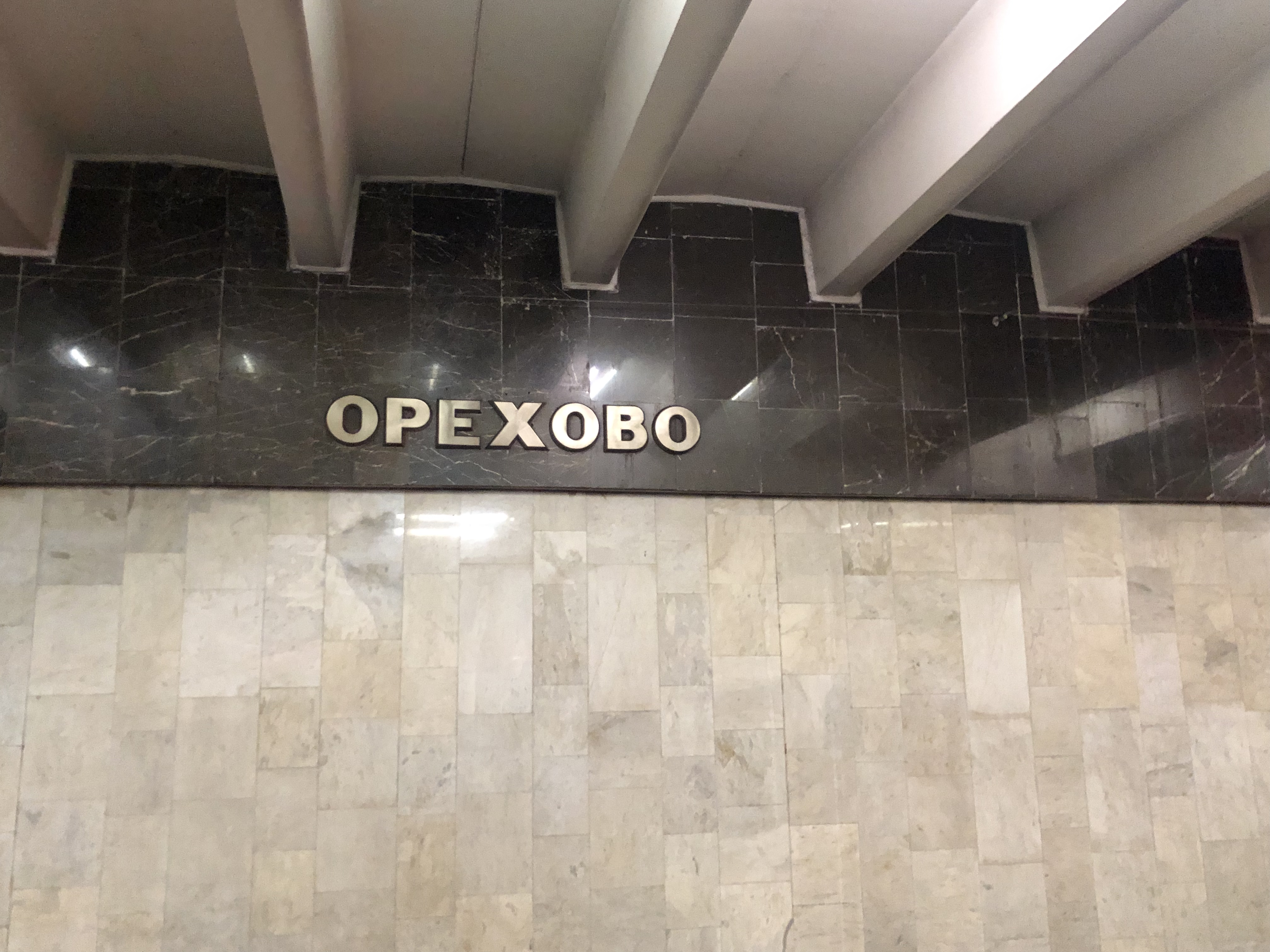

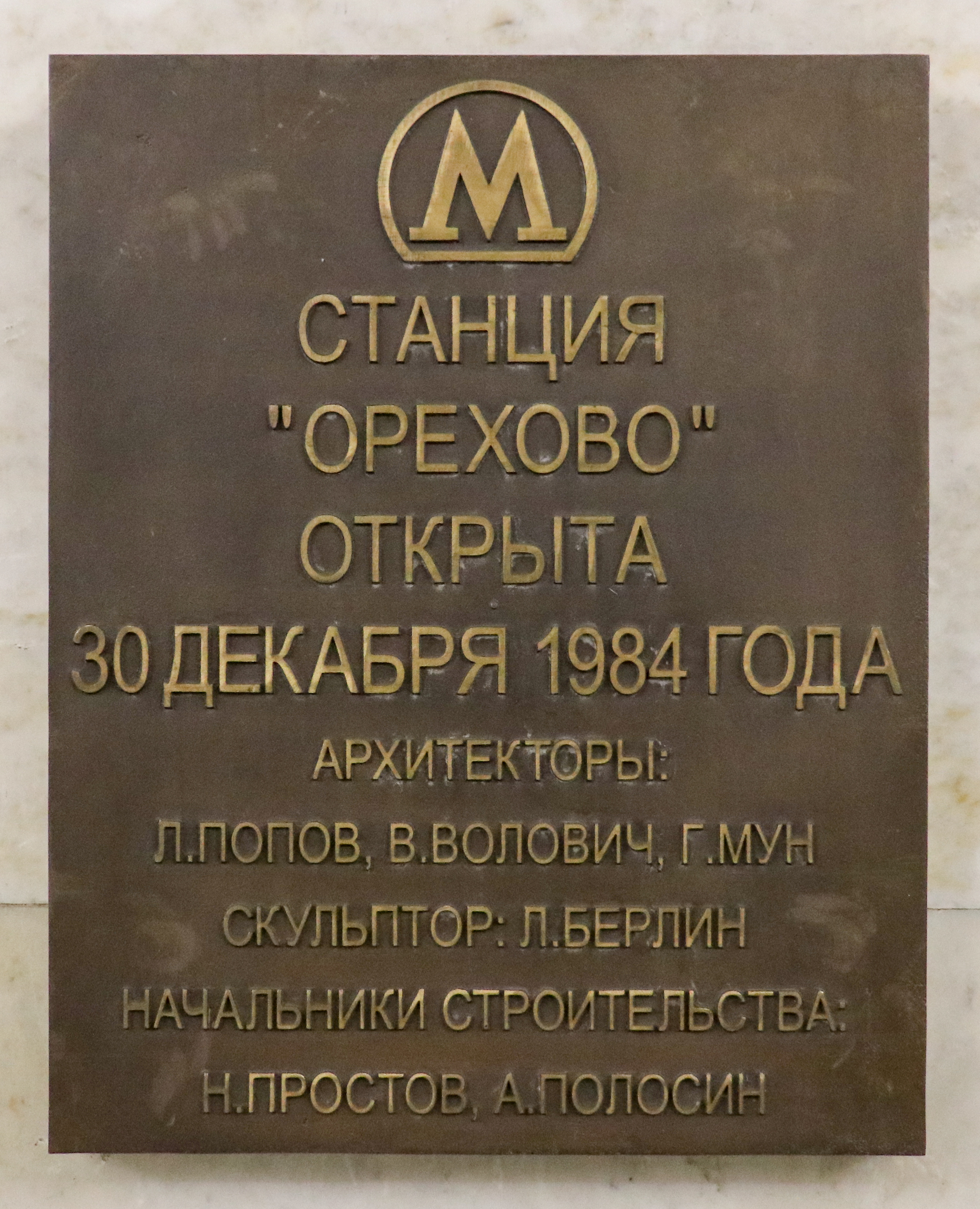

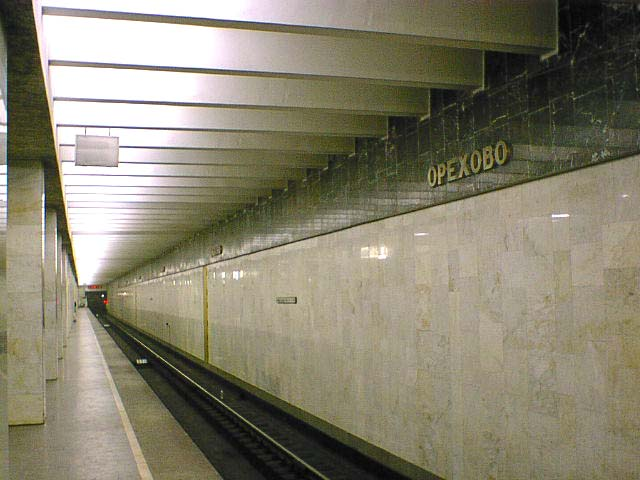

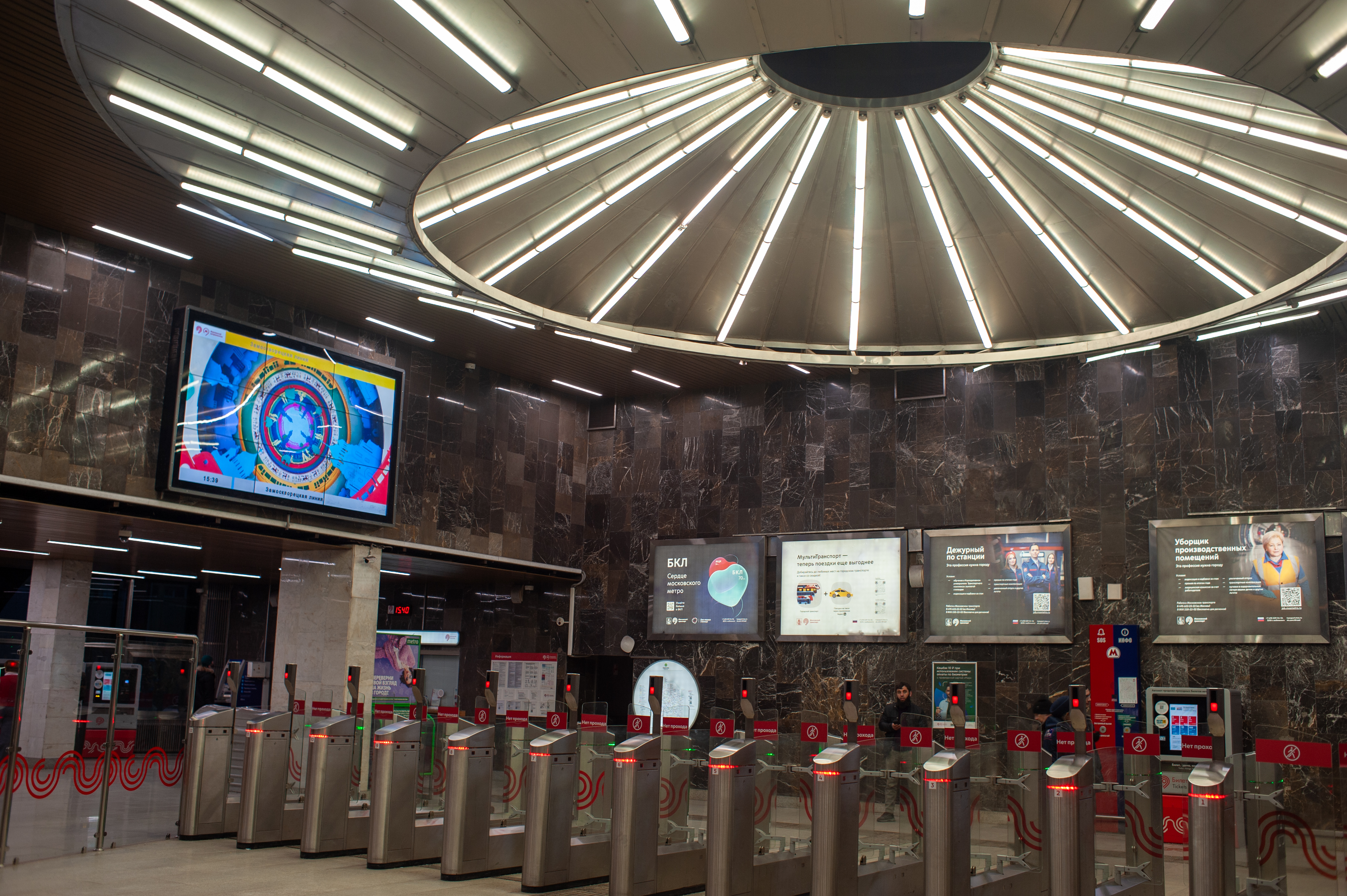

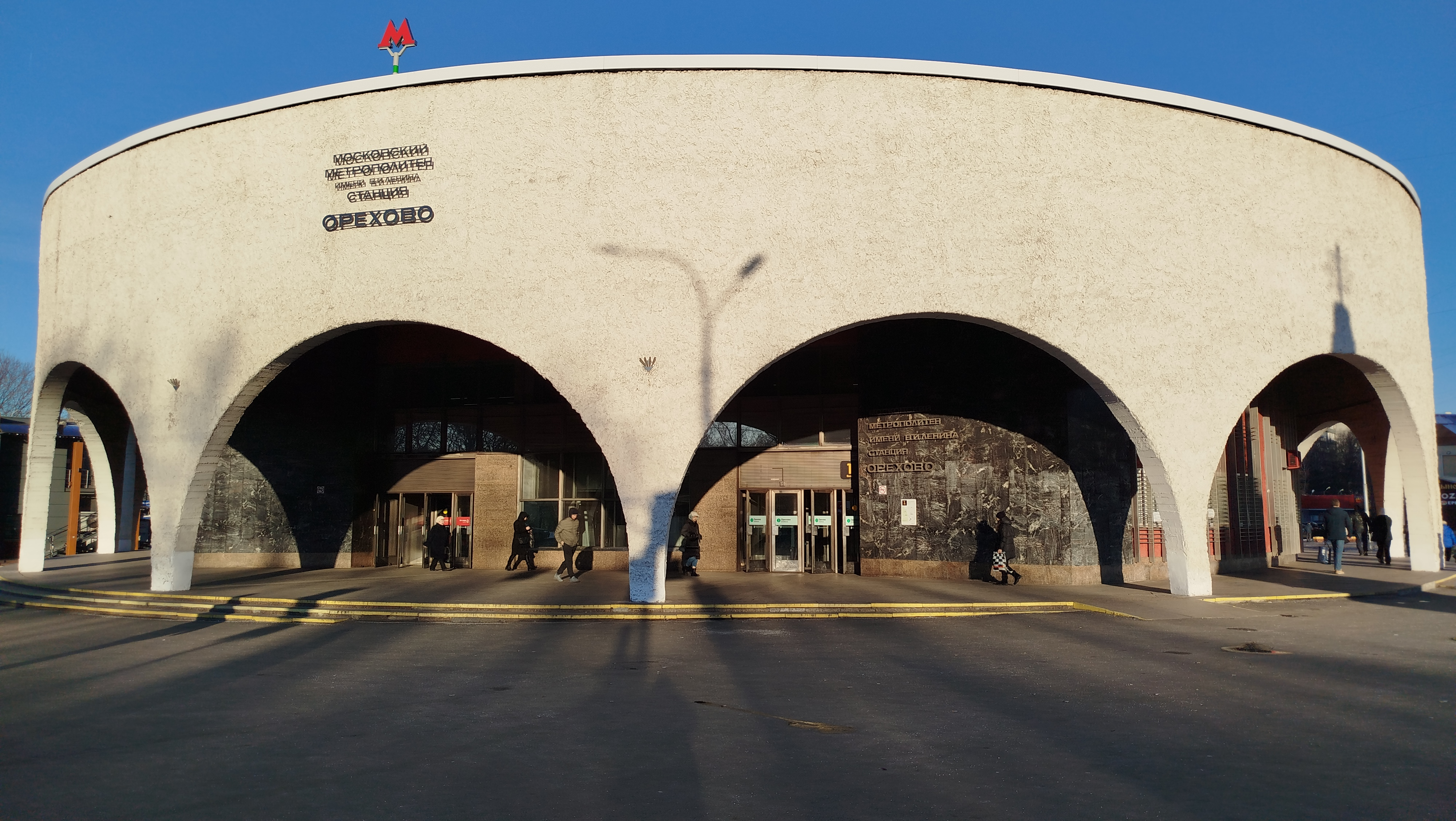
