= Tsaritsyno =

Tsaritsyno may refer to:

- Tsaritsyno District, a district in Southern Administrative Okrug of Moscow, Russia
- Tsaritsyno (Moscow Metro), a station of the Moscow Metro, Russia
- Tsaritsyno Park, a park in Moscow

== See also ==
- Volgograd, formerly known as Tsaritsyn
