= Kantemirovsky =

Kantemirovsky (masculine), Kantemirovskaya (feminine), or Kantemirovskoye (neuter) may refer to:

- Kantemirovsky District, a district of Voronezh Oblast, Russia
- Kantemirovskaya (Moscow Metro), a station of the Moscow Metro, Moscow, Russia
- 4th Guards Kantemirovskaya Tank Division, an elite armored division of the Russian Ground Forces
