= Kantemirovskaya (Moscow Metro) =

Moscow Metro station

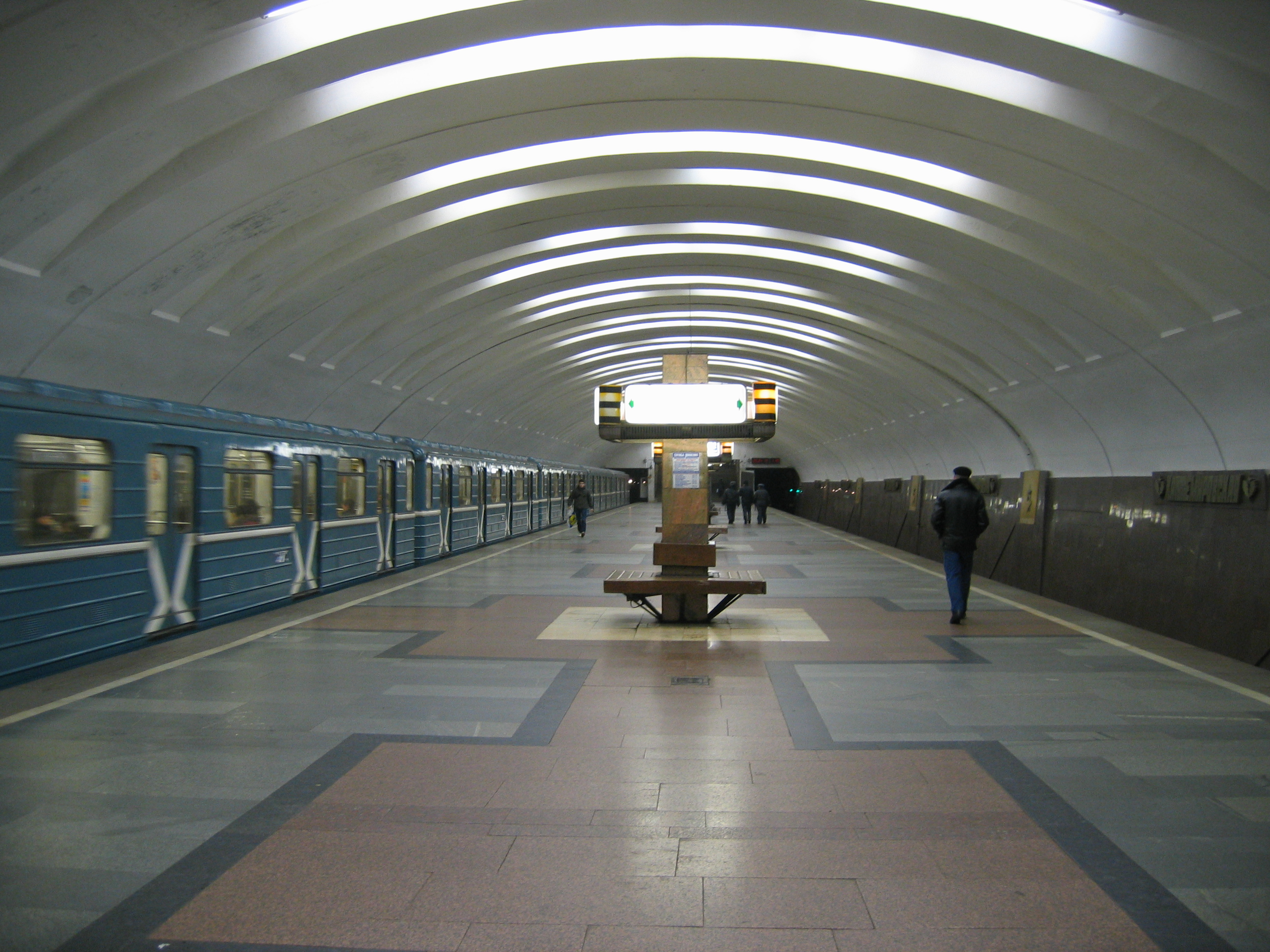

General information
- Location: Tsaritsyno District; Southern Administrative Okrug; Moscow; Russia
- Coordinates: 55.6358°N 37.6564°E
- System: Moscow Metro station
- Owner: Moskovsky Metropoliten
- Line: Zamoskvoretskaya line
- Platforms: 1 island platform
- Tracks: 2
- Connections: Bus: м84, м89, е80, 663, 818, с823, с839, 844, с850, с891. Night rotes: н13. Suburban routs: 489, 1020, 1066, 1200

Construction
- Structure type: Shallow one-vault
- Depth: 8 metres (26 ft)
- Platform levels: 1
- Parking: No

Other information
- Station code: 024

History
- Opened: 30 December 1984; 41 years ago
- Closed: 31 December 1984; 41 years ago
- Rebuilt: 9 February 1985; 41 years ago

Passengers
- 2002: 20,677,250

Services
Preceding station	Moscow Metro	Following station
Kashirskaya towards Khovrino	Zamoskvoretskaya line	Tsaritsyno towards Alma-Atinskaya
Route map
Location
- Location within Moscow Metro

Kantemirovskaya (Russian: Кантемировская) is a Moscow Metro station in Tsaritsyno District, Southern Administrative Okrug, Moscow. It is on the Zamoskvoretskaya Line, between Kashirskaya and Tsaritsyno stations at the intersection of Proletarsky (Proletariat) avenue and Kantemirovskaya street. The station got its name from Kantemirovskaya Street, which in turn was named in honor of the 4th Guards Kantemirovskaya Tank Division.

Kantemirovskaya opened on 30 December 1984 as part of an extension but was closed the very next day because of flooding. It reopened on 9 February 1985.

Kantemirovskaya, having been designed by Rimidalv Pogrebnoy and Vladimir Filippov, is a shallow one-vault station with benches and signs attached to pink marble pillars situated along the center axis of the platform. The walls are faced with brown marble. A set of sculptures by Alexander Kibalnikov is located at one of the platform's ends.

The station was closed from 12 November 2022 to May 2023 due to the reconstruction works.
