= Alma-Atinskaya =

Alma-Atinskaya:

- Alma-Atinskaya (Moscow Metro)
- Alma-Atinskaya declaration; see Alma-Ata Protocol
