= Domodedovsky =

Domodedovsky (masculine), Domodedovskaya (feminine), or Domodedovskoye (neuter) may refer to:

- Domodedovsky District (1969–2011), former administrative district of Moscow Oblast, Russia
- Domodedovskaya, a station of the Moscow Metro, Moscow, Russia
