= Tsaritsyno (Moscow Metro) =

Moscow Metro station

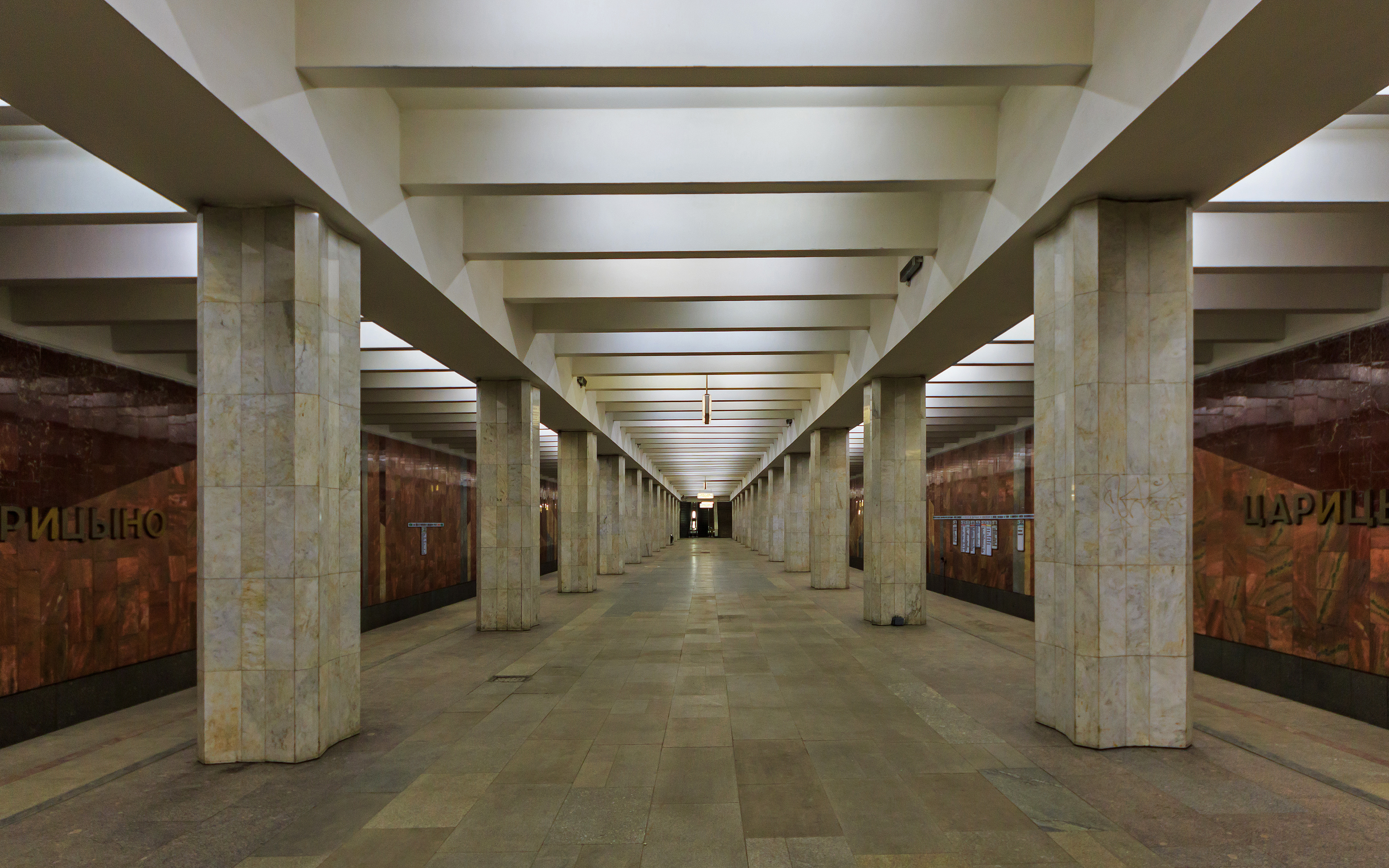

General information
- Location: Tsaritsyno District, Southern Administrative Okrug; Moscow; Russia
- Coordinates: 55.6214°N 37.6694°E
- System: Moscow Metro station
- Owner: Moskovsky Metropoliten
- Line: Zamoskvoretskaya line
- Platforms: 1 island platform
- Tracks: 2
- Connections: Bus: м82, м87, м88, м89, 814, с823, 844, с854, с869, 921, н13 (night bus).

Construction
- Structure type: Shallow column tri-vault
- Depth: 8 metres (26 ft)
- Platform levels: 1
- Parking: No

Other information
- Station code: 023

History
- Opened: 30 December 1984; 41 years ago
- Closed: 31 December 1984; 41 years ago
- Rebuilt: 9 February 1985; 41 years ago
- Former names: Lenino (1984–1990)

Passengers
- 2002: 32,704,000

Services
Preceding station	Moscow Metro	Following station
Kantemirovskaya towards Khovrino	Zamoskvoretskaya line	Orekhovo towards Alma-Atinskaya
Route map
Location
- Location within Moscow Metro

Tsaritsyno (Russian: Царицыно) is a Moscow Metro station in Tsaritsyno District, Southern Administrative Okrug, Moscow. It is on the Zamoskvoretskaya line, between Kantemirovskaya and Orekhovo stations. The entrance is located at the intersection of Luganskaya, Kaspiyskaya and Tovarishchesckaya ('Luhansk', 'Caspian', and 'Tovarishch' streets). (Note: These streets are namesakes of the city of Luhansk, the Caspian Sea or region, while Tovarishch is 'friend' or 'comrade'.)

Tsaritsyno opened on 30 December 1984 as part of an extension but was closed the very next day because of flooding. It reopened on 9 February 1985.

From its opening until November 1990, the station was named Lenino for the Lenino-Dachnoye region. The city renamed the station Tsaritsyno for Tsaritsyno Park, which houses a palace once owned by Catherine the Great.

The station was closed from 12 November 2022 to May 2023 due to the reconstruction works.

== Design ==
The station was designed by architects V. Cheremin and A. Vigdorov. It has white marble pillars, walls inlaid with patterns of red, brown, grey and yellow marble and mosaics depicting the achievements of the Soviet science. A mosaic by A. Kuznetsov above the entrance stairs depicts the Moscow skyline.
