= Kashirskoye Highway =

Street in Moscow, Russia

Coordinates: 55°38′21″N 37°41′17″E

Kashira Highway
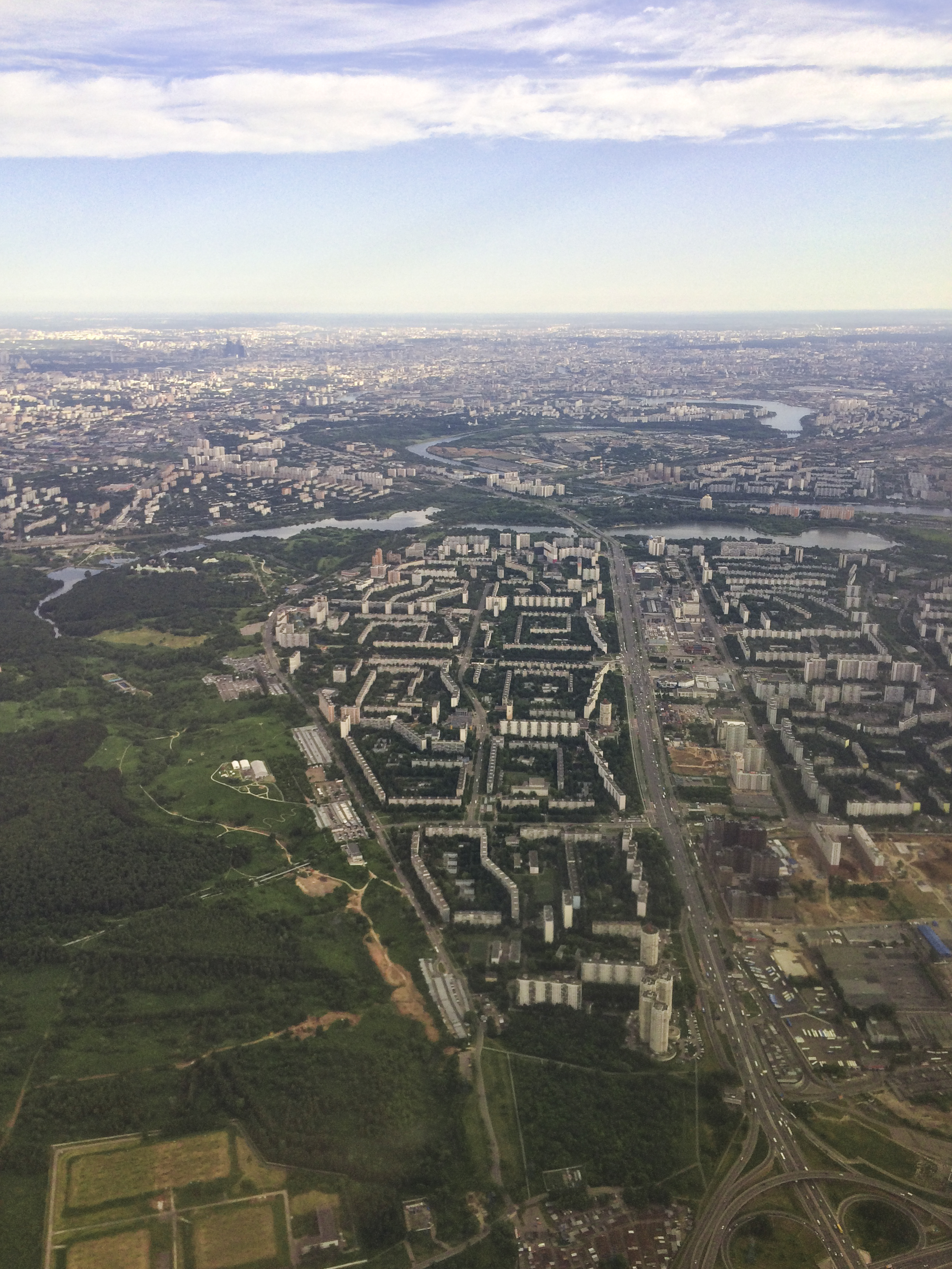
- Native name: Каширское шоссе (Russian)
- Length: 10.5 km (6.5 mi)
- Location: Moscow; Southern Administrative Okrug
- Nearest metro station: Domodedovskaya; Kashirskaya; Nagatinskaya

Kashirskoye Highway or Kashira Highway (Russian: Каширское шоссе, Kashirskoye Shosse) is a major street in Moscow, Russia, continued as a highway beyond the city into Moscow Oblast as a backup route for highway M4. It was named in the 19th century after the old Kashira Road, which led to the town of Kashira. It was one of the sites of the Russian apartment bombings of 1999. Along the road, major landmarks include the Saburovo Church and the Orekhovo-Borisovo Cathedral.

== Gallery ==
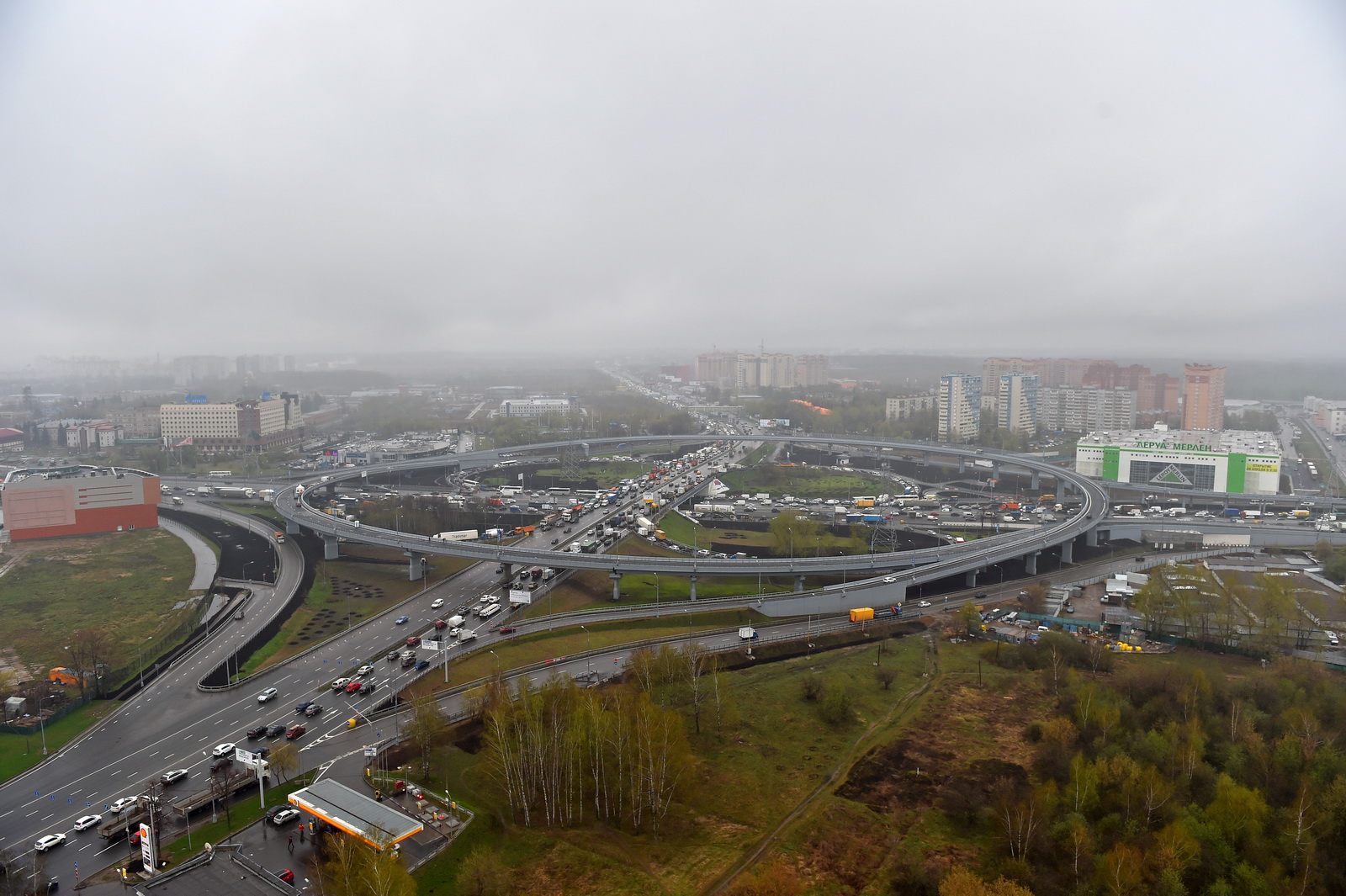
An interchange with Moscow Ring Road.
