= Krasnogvardeyskaya (Moscow Metro) =

Moscow Metro station

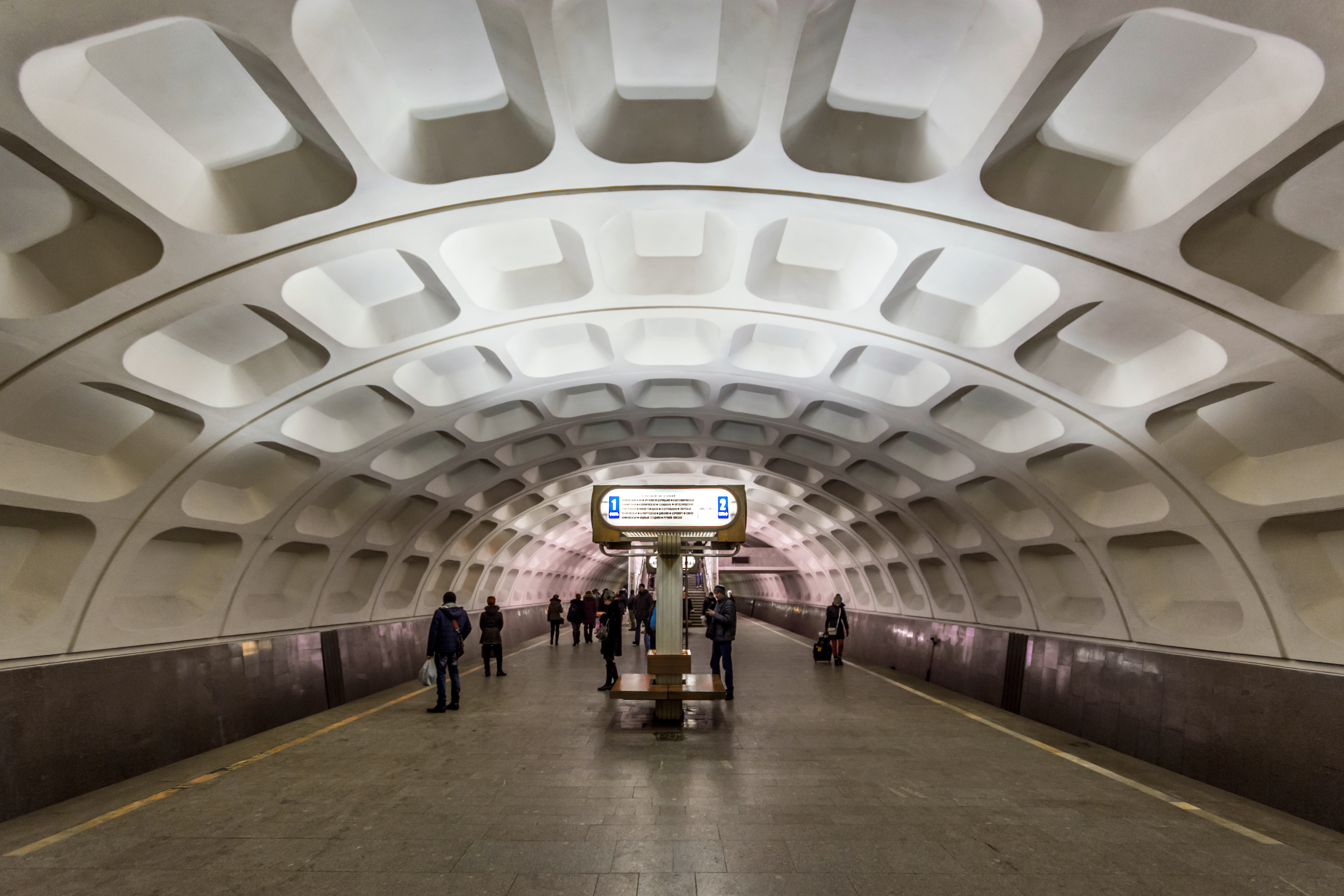

General information
- Location: Zyablikovo District; Southern Administrative Okrug; Moscow; Russia
- Coordinates: 55.6137°N 37.7444°E
- System: Moscow Metro station
- Owner: Moskovsky Metropoliten
- Line: Zamoskvoretskaya line
- Platforms: 1 island platform
- Tracks: 2
- Connections: Bus: м77, м78, м82, м86, с819, 828, 837, с848, с894, 899, н5 (the night bus).

Construction
- Structure type: Shallow one-vault
- Depth: 9 m (30 ft)
- Platform levels: 1
- Parking: No

Other information
- Station code: 020

History
- Opened: 7 September 1985; 40 years ago

Services
Preceding station	Moscow Metro	Following station
Domodedovskaya towards Khovrino	Zamoskvoretskaya line	Alma-Atinskaya Terminus
Shipilovskaya towards Fiztekh	Lyublinsko-Dmitrovskaya line transfer at Zyablikovo	Terminus
Route map
Location
- Location within Moscow Metro

Krasnogvardeyskaya (Russian: Красногварде́йская) is a Moscow Metro station in the Zyablikovo District, Southern Administrative Okrug, Moscow. It is on the Zamoskvoretskaya line, between Domodedovskaya and Alma-Atinskaya. Krasnogvardeyskaya opened on 7 September 1985 and was named after the former Krasnogvardeysky district.

== Location ==
The station is located in the Zyablikovo District. Entrances lead to Orekhovy boulevard, Musa Dzhalil and Yasenevaya streets.

== Transfer ==
Krasnogvardeyskaya is a transfer station. The transfer to Zyablikovo station which belongs to Lyublinsko-Dmitrovskaya Line was opened on 2 December 2011. At the time of opening the transfer, both Krasnogvardeyskaya and Zyablikovo were the terminal stations on their respective lines.

== Building ==
Krasnogvardeyskaya was designed by architects I. Petukhova and N. Shumakov. It is a vault-type station with a coffered ceiling and walls faced with red marble, similar to the architecture of many of the stations on the Washington Metro in Washington, DC. The theme of the station's decorative elements, which include stained-glass panels by L. Berlin, is "The Red Guards of Moscow, 1917."
