= Kakhovsky =

Kakhovsky (masculine), Kakhovskaya (feminine), or Kakhovskoye (neuter) may refer to:

- Kakhovskaya Line, a line of the Moscow Metro, Moscow, Russia
- Kakhovskaya (Metro), a station of the Moscow Metro

== Family name ==
- Mikhail Kakhovsky (1734–1800), Russian infantry general
- Pyotr Kakhovsky (1797–1826), Russian Decembrist

== See also ==
- Kakhovka, a city in Kherson Oblast, Ukraine (adjectival form "Kakhovsky")
