= 81-775 series =

Russian electric subway train family

81-775/776/777
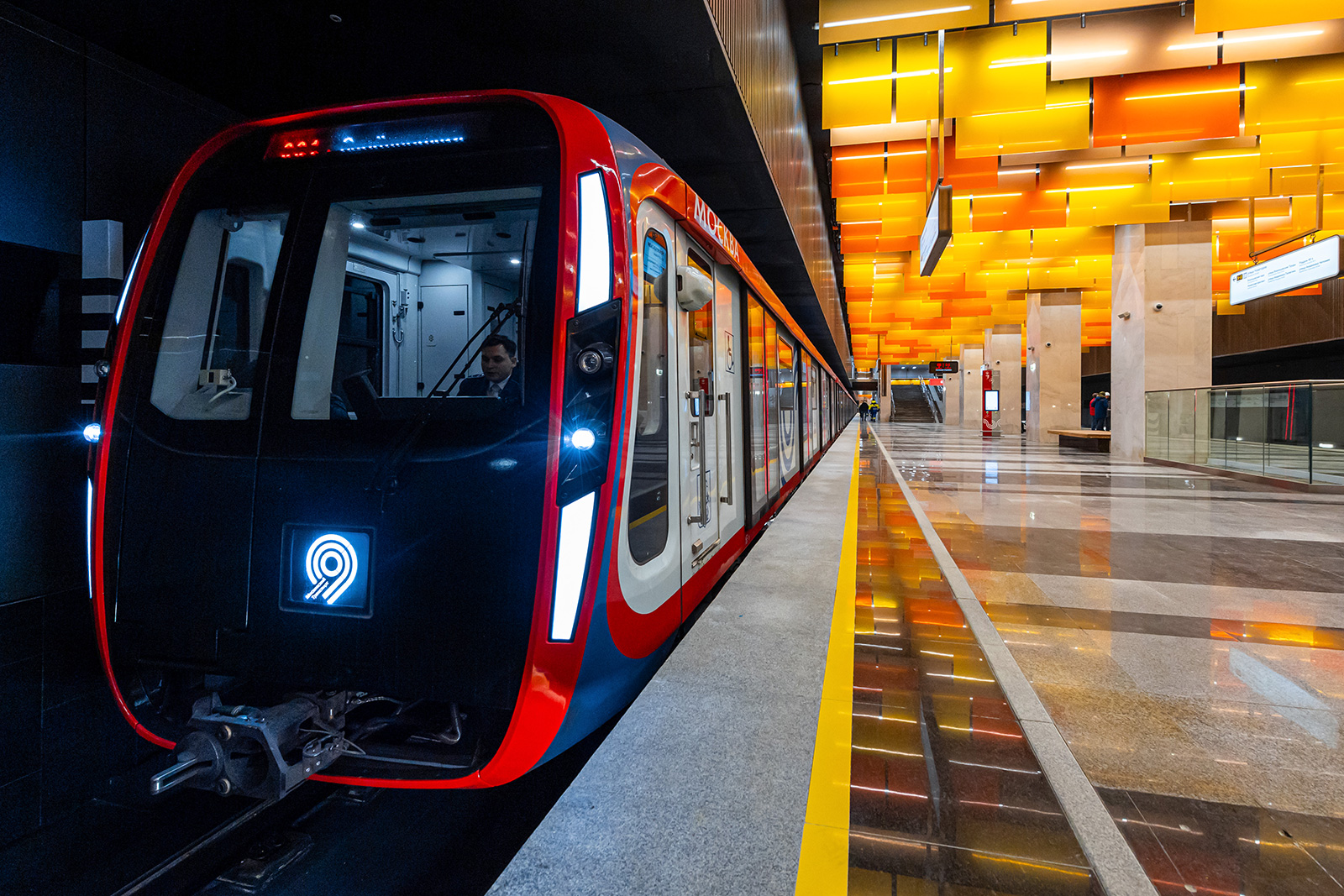
- Moskva-2020

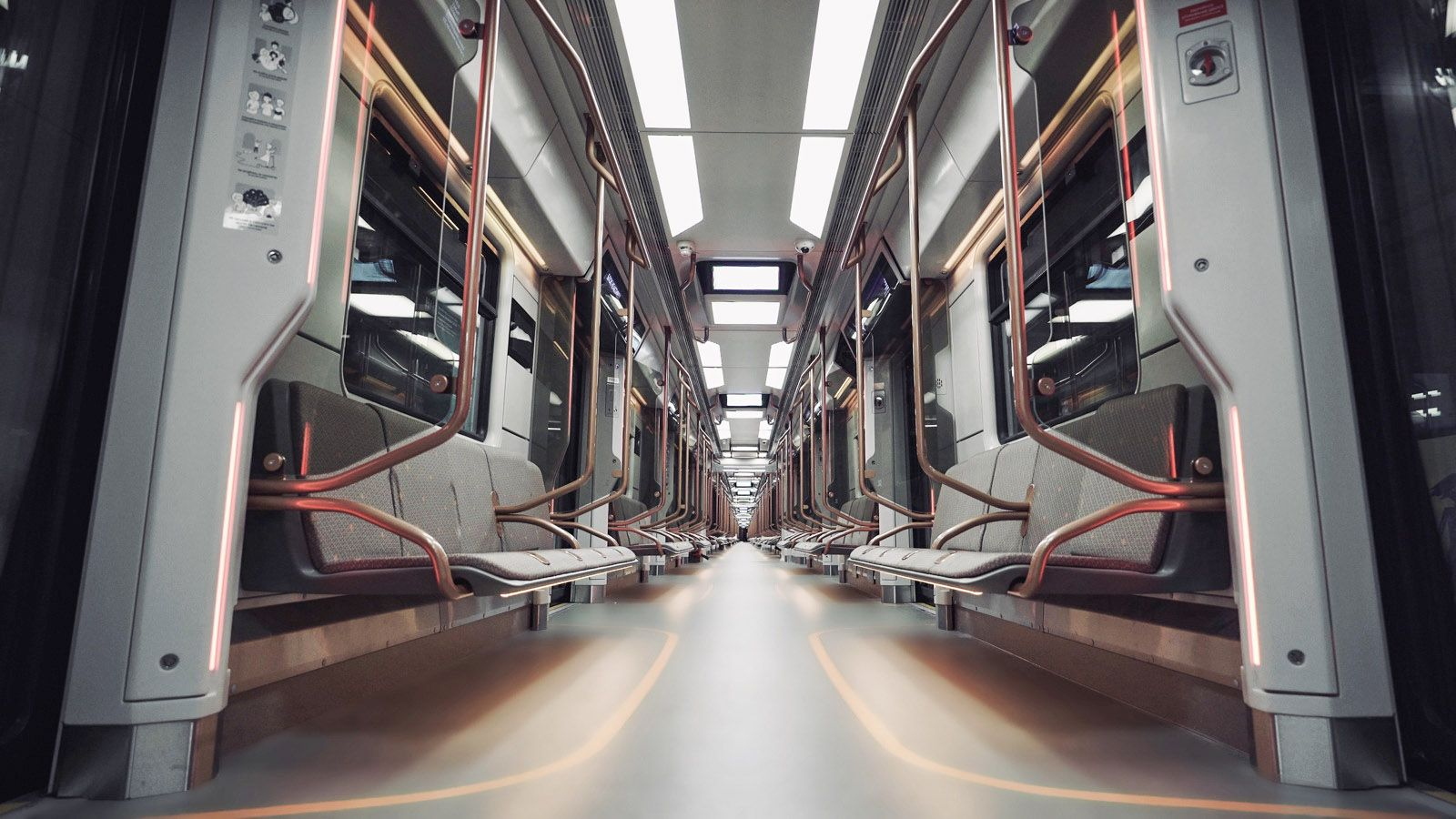
- In service: 2020 — present day
- Manufacturer: Transmashholding (Russia)
- Built at: Metrowagonmash (Russia)
- Constructed: 2020 — present
- Entered service: 6 October 2020
- Number built: 171 trainsets (1328 cars) (As of February 2024); 81-775 series: 128 8-car trainsets, 40 7-car trainsets 81-775.2 series: 3 8-car trainsets 81-775: 336 cars 81-776: 632 cars 81-777: 336 cars 81-775.2: 6 cars 81-776.2: 12 cars 81-777.2: 6 cars
- Predecessor: 81-765 series
- Formation: 2 — 8 cars
- Operator: Moscow Metro
- Lines served: Zamoskvoretskaya line Koltsevaya line Kaluzhsko-Rizhskaya line Bolshaya Koltsevaya line Troitskaya line

Specifications
- Car body construction: stainless steel
- Doors: 4 pairs per car
- Maximum speed: 90 km/h (56 mph)
- Traction system: Metrowagonmash KATP-4 IGBT-VVVF
- Traction motors: asynchronous motor, TME 43-23-4
- Power output: 4x 170 kW (230 hp) per motor car
- Acceleration: 1.3 m/s^{2} (4.3 ft/s^{2})
- Deceleration: 1.1 m/s^{2} (3.6 ft/s^{2})
- Electric system: 750 V DC (mean)
- Current collection: third rail
- Braking systems: electro-pneumatic early, disk brakes later.
- Safety systems: SKIF-M, ALS-ARS (ATS-ASR), with ATO
- Track gauge: 1,520 mm (4 ft 11 27/32 in) Russian gauge

The 81-775 series (named Moskva-2020, Russian: Москва-2020) is a family of metro cars designed by Metrowagonmash. The series consists of three types: The 81-775 (head motor car), the 81-776 (intermediate motor car), and the 81-777 (intermediate non-motor car). It has been in service on the Moscow Metro since 2020.

== 81-775.2 ==
The 81-775.2 series (named Moskva-2024 & Moskva-2026) is a facelifted/modified version introduced in 2024. The first train was delivered to the Moscow Metro in December 2023. Regular passenger operation of the 81-775.2 began on 11 March 2024 on the Zamoskvoretskaya line, replacing older 81-717 trains. As of March 2026, the replacement of the line's rolling stock has not yet been completed, one of the reasons being the opening and extension of the Troitskaya line. In December 2025, the new 81-775.2 "Moskva-2026", a minor facelift of the 81-775.2 "Moskva-2024", entered regular passenger service on the same Zamoskvoretskaya line.

== Gallery ==
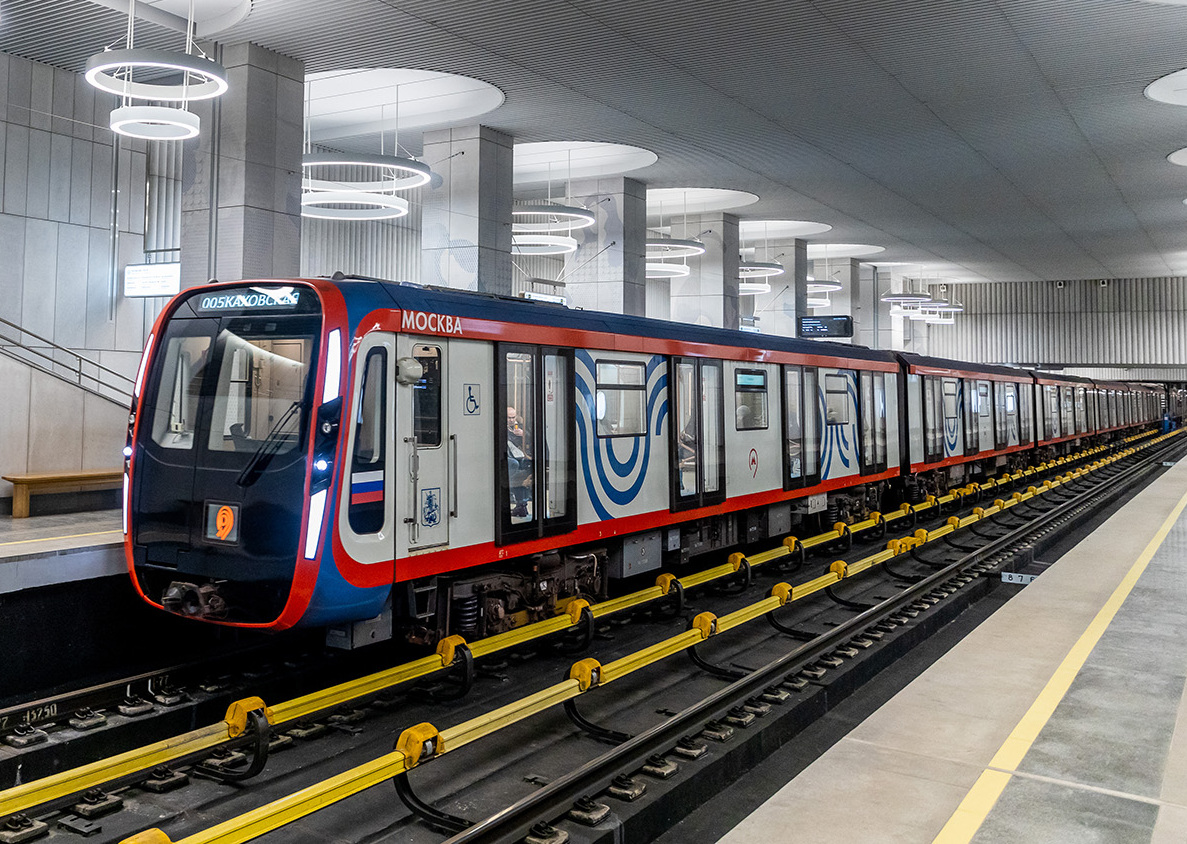
Moskva-2020 on Large Circle Line

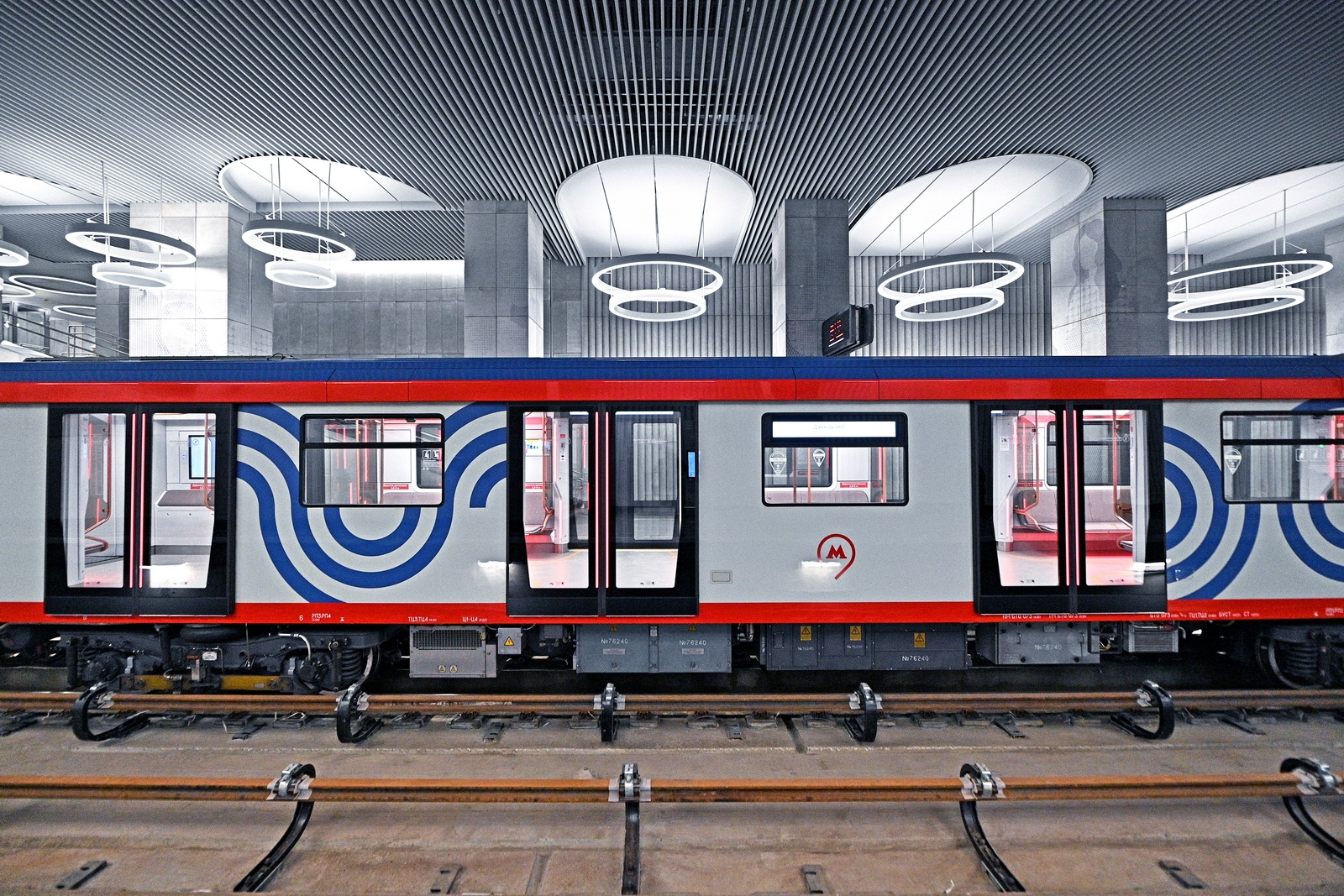
Moskva-2020 on Large Circle Line

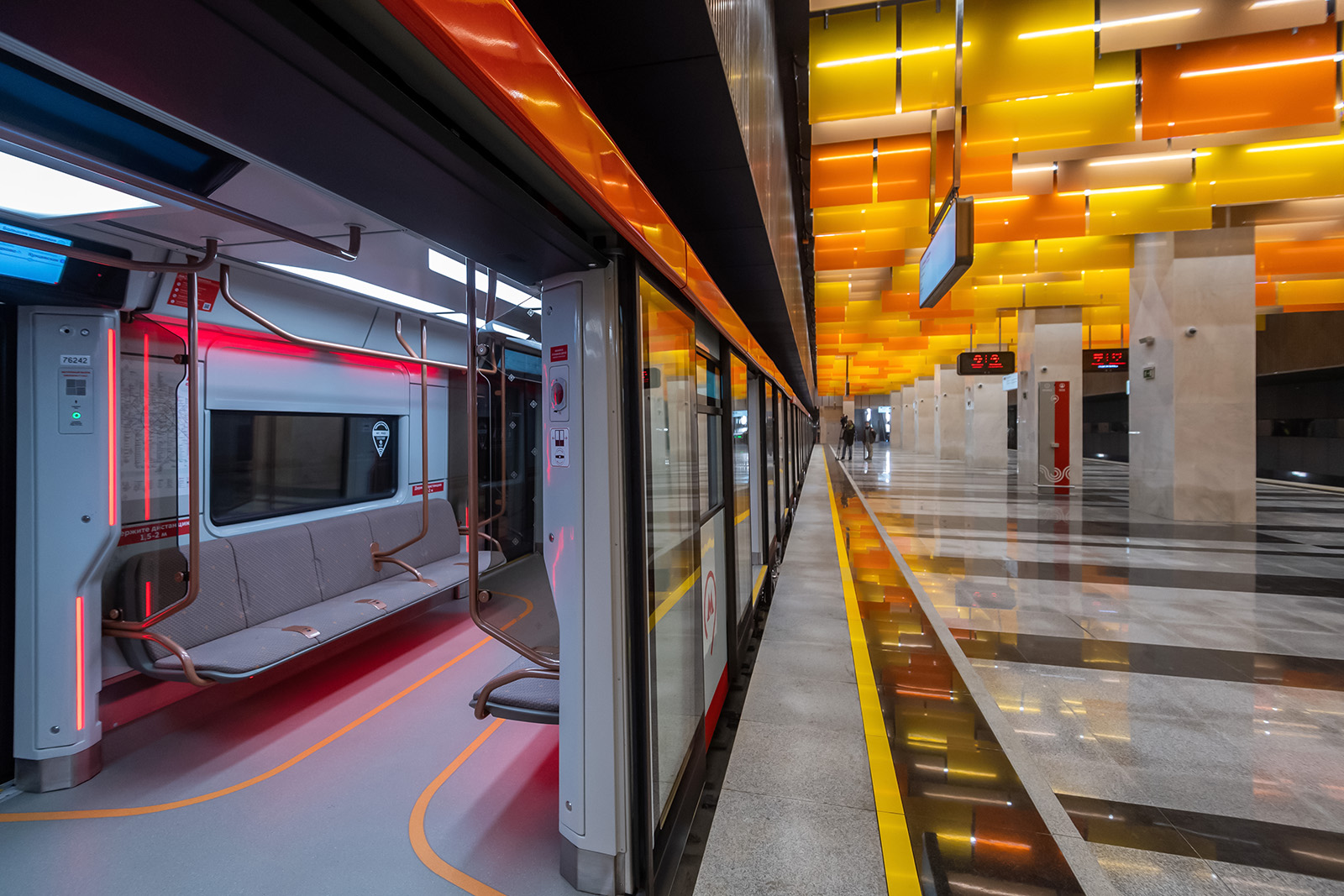
Moskva-2020 on Large Circle Line

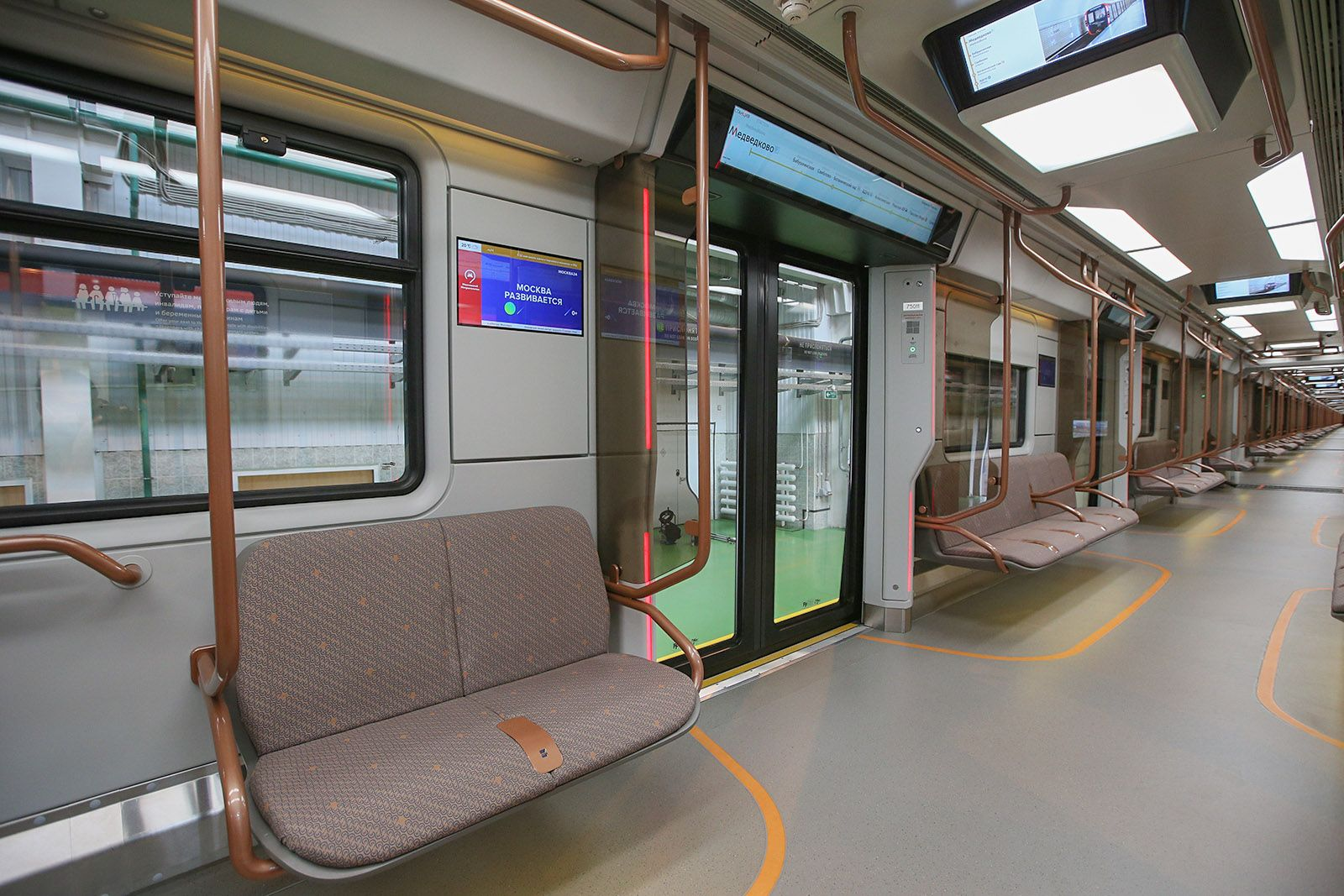
Moskva-2020 interior

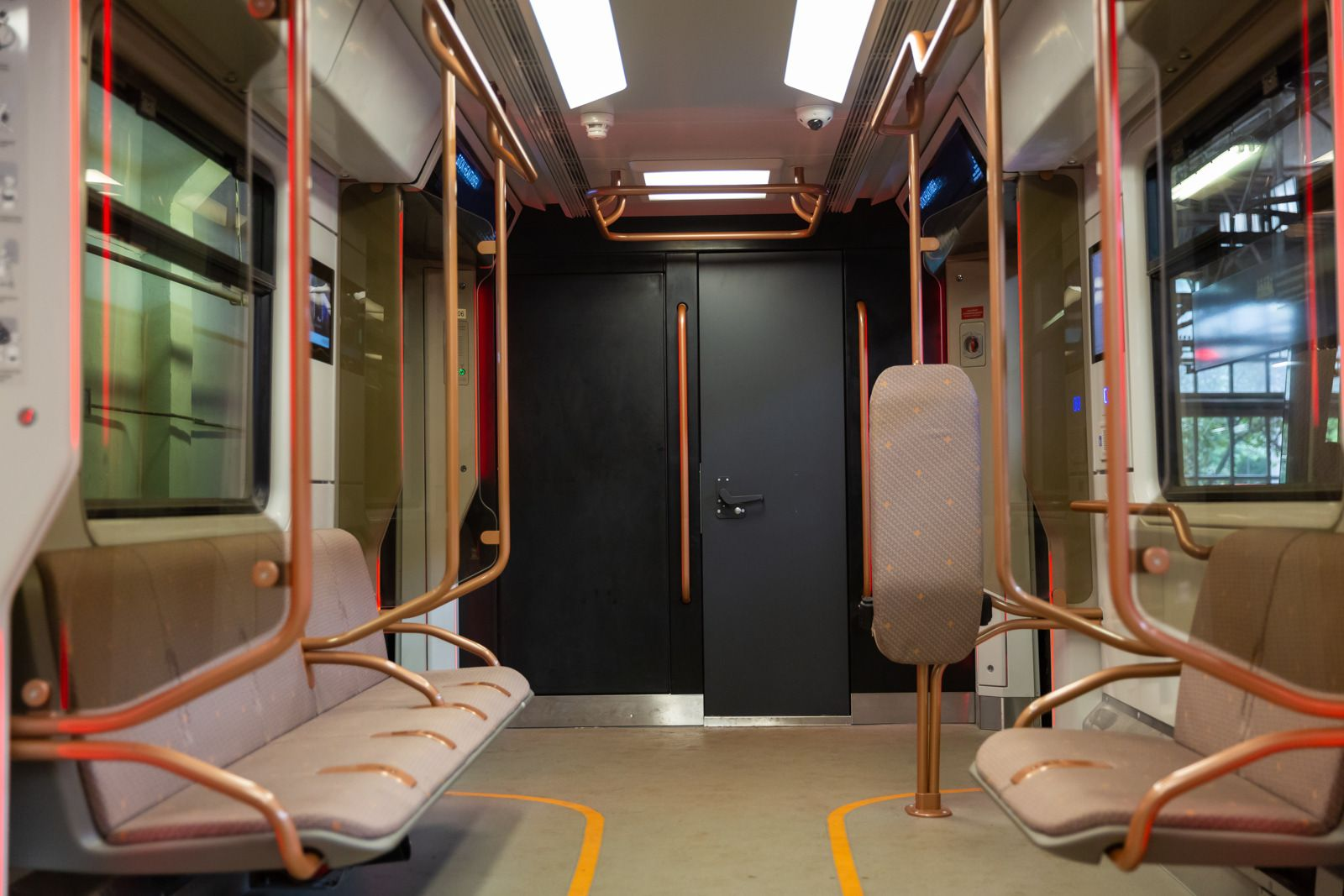
Moskva-2020 interior

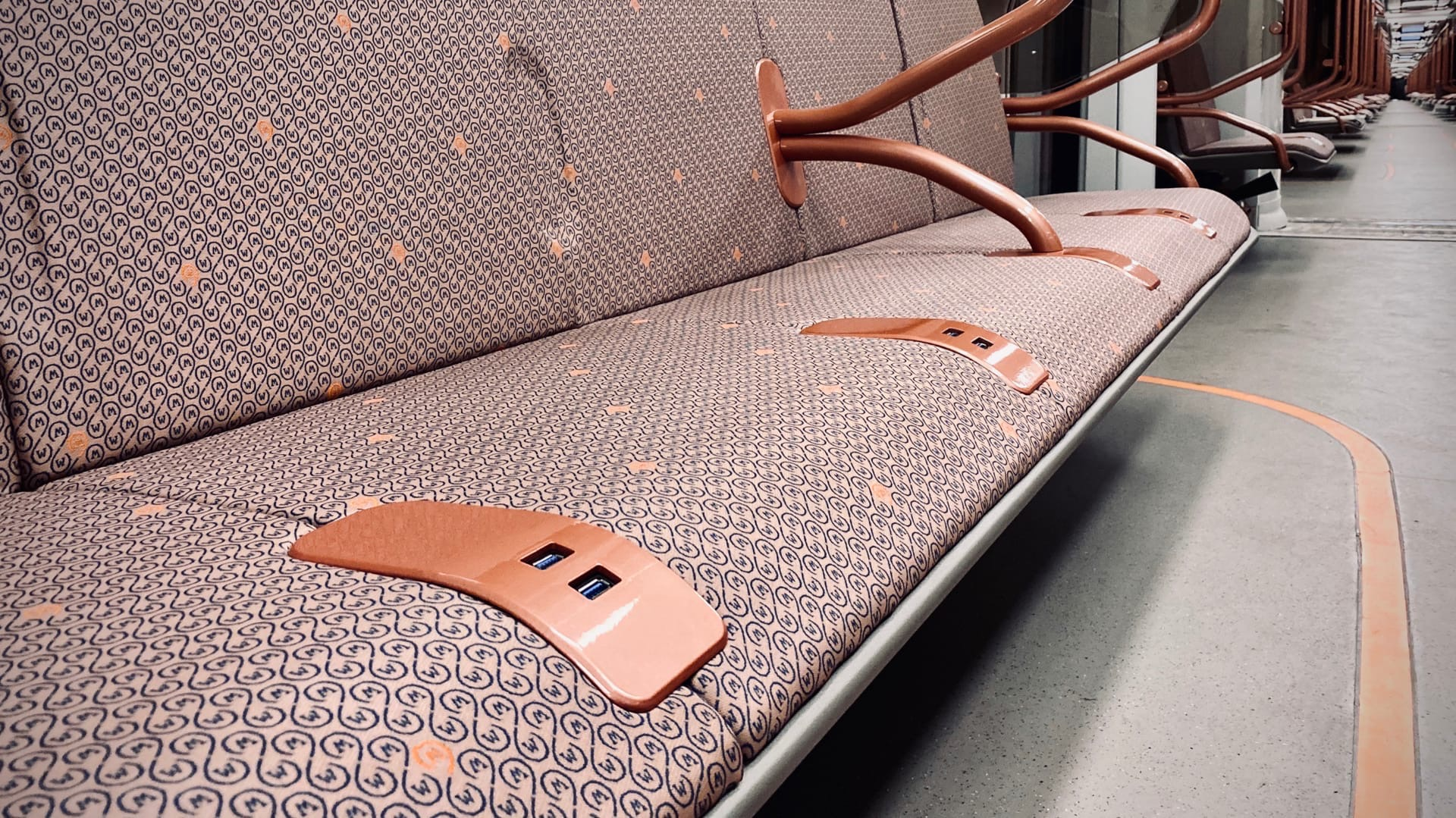
Moskva-2020 interior

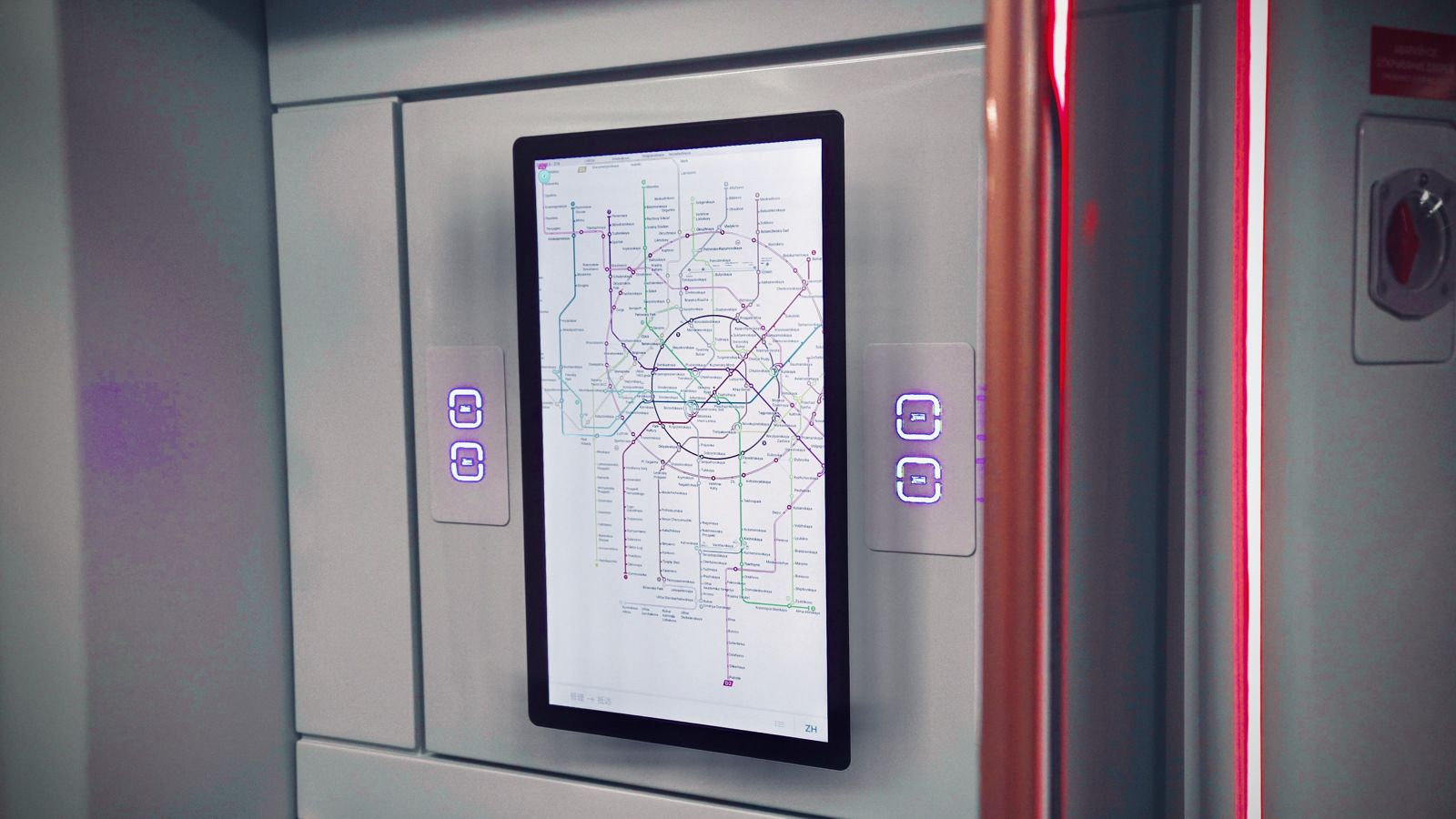
Moskva-2020 interior

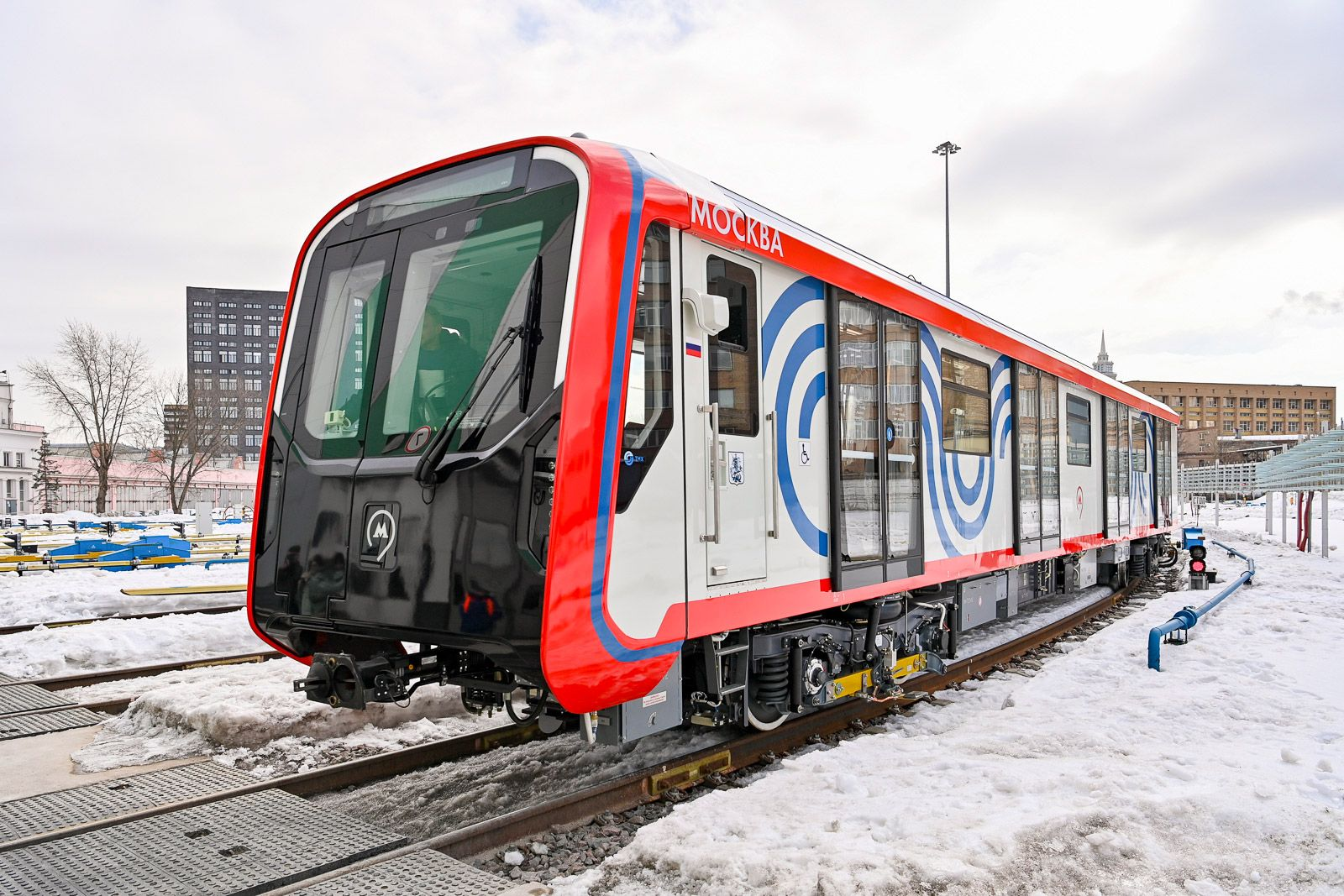
Moskva-2024 cab car

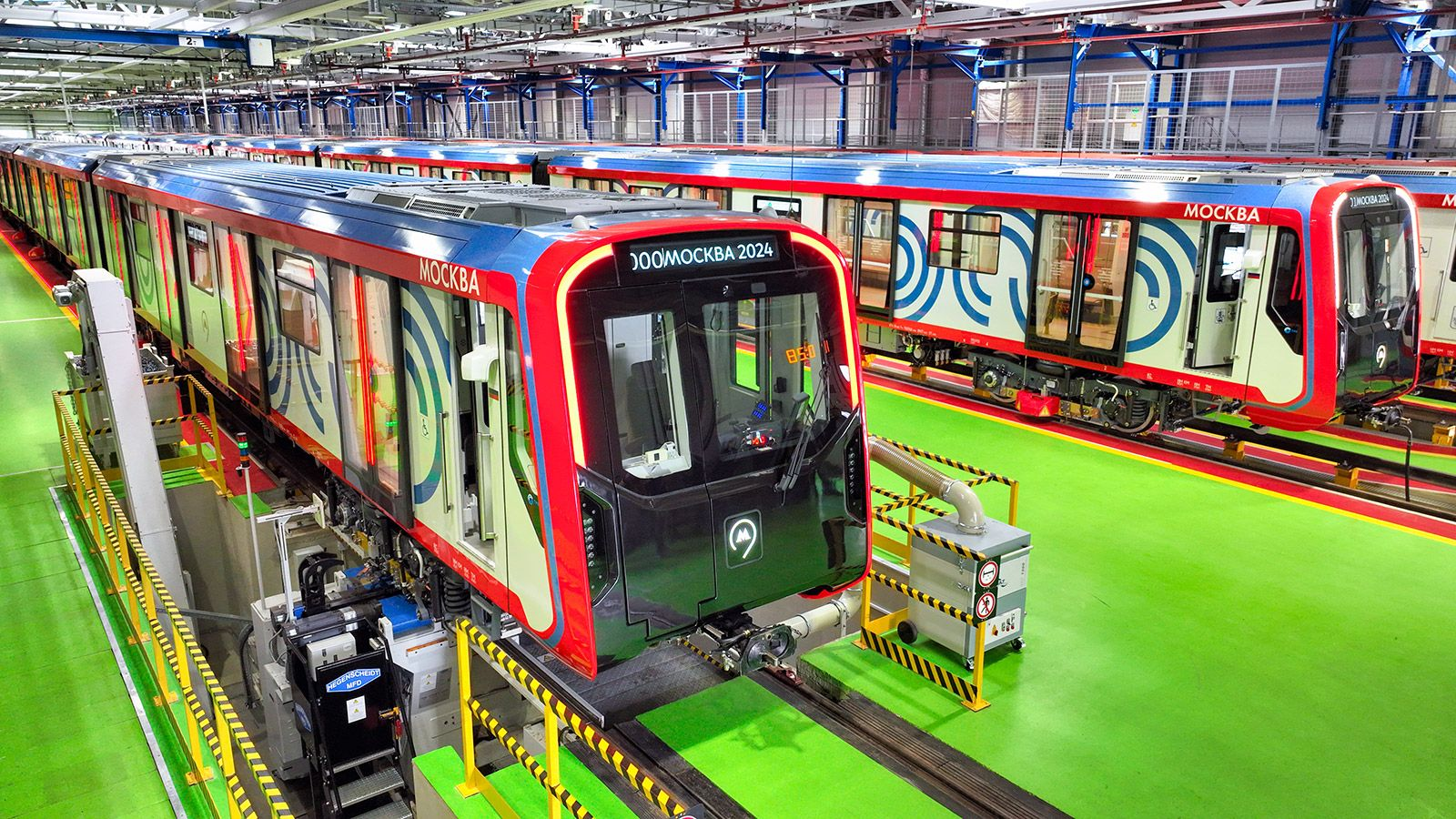
Moskva-2024 in depot

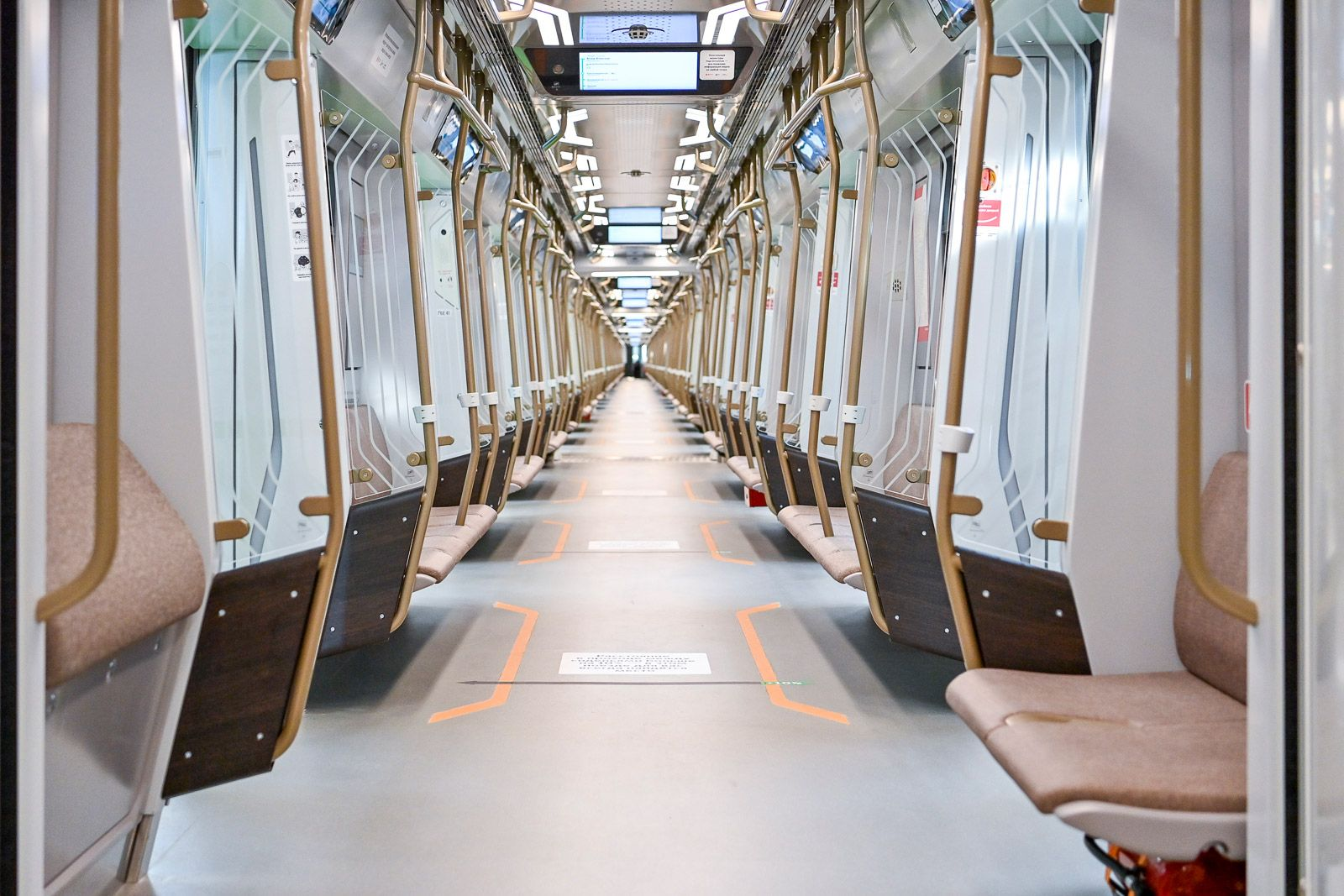
Moskva-2024 interior

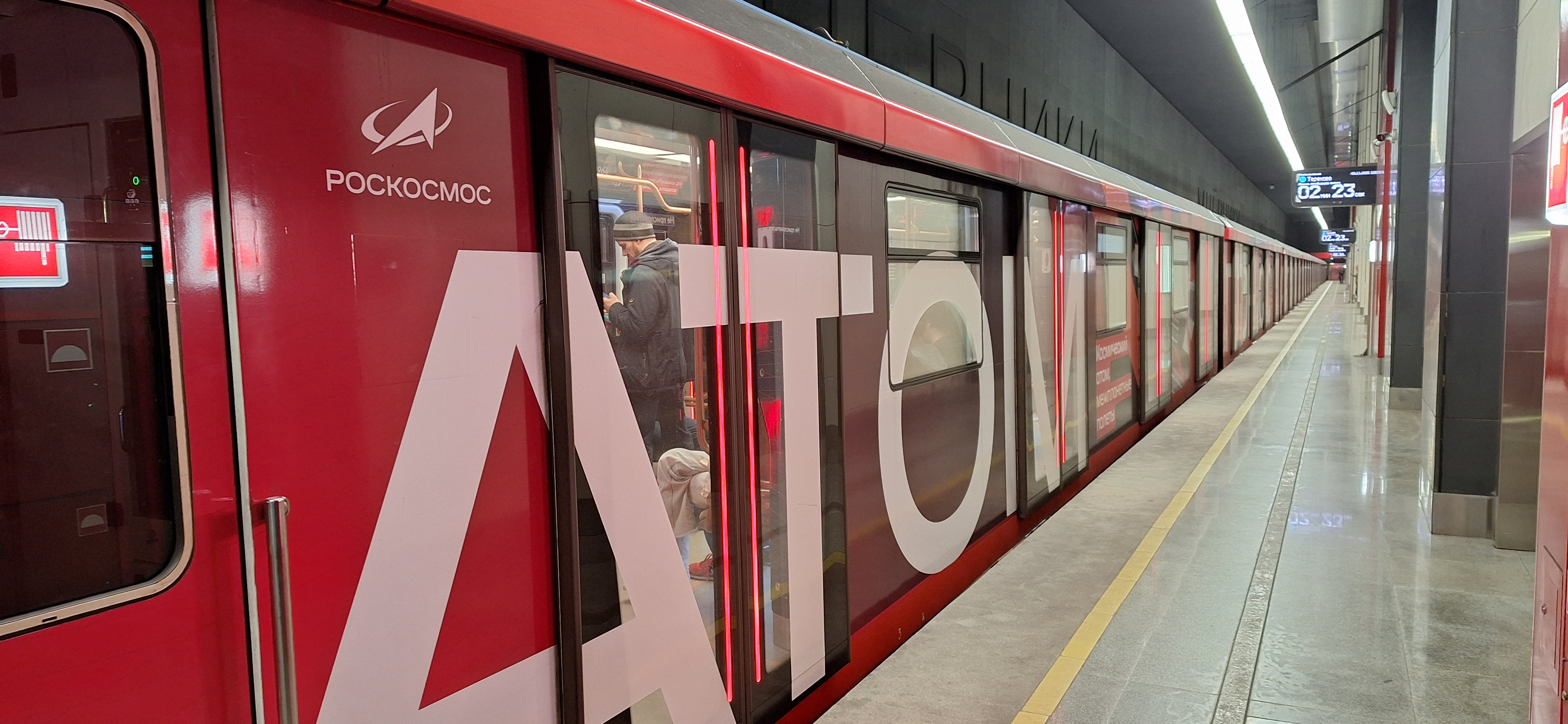
Roscosmos thematic train.
