= Church of the Holy Trinity at the Borisovo Ponds =

Church in Moscow, Russia

Coordinates: 55.627418°N 37.71192°E

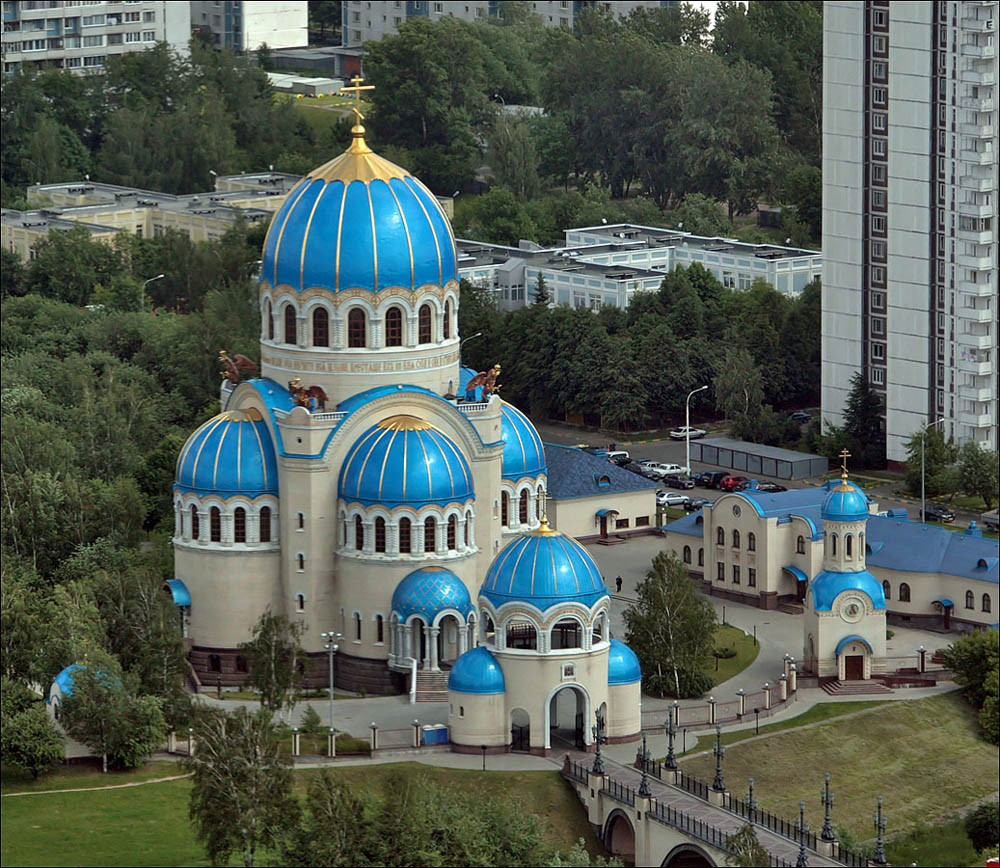
Holy Trinity Church in Orekhovo-Borisovo

The Church of the Holy Trinity at the Borisovo Ponds (храм Троицы в Орехове-Борисове) is a metochion of the Patriarch of Moscow on the Kashira Highway in Orekhovo-Borisovo, a residential district in South Moscow. It was built in 2001–2004 to a Byzantine Revival design by Vladimir Kolosnitsyn, an architect favored by Mayor of Moscow, Yuri Luzhkov. Apart from the 70-metre-tall main church, the compound includes a chapel, a free-standing prothesis, a zvonnitsa, and a school. The interior has an icon screen made of porcelain and the academic wall paintings by Vasily Nesterenko. The church was originally slated to be erected in 1988, in commemoration of the millennium of the Baptism of Rus, but those plans did not materialize until 15 years later.
