= Zamoskvoretskaya line =

Line of Moscow metro

Overview
- Owner: Moskovsky Metropoliten
- Locale: Moscow
- Termini: Khovrino (northwest); Alma-Atinskaya (southeast)
- Stations: 24

Service
- Type: Rapid transit
- System: Moscow Metro
- Operator: Moskovsky Metropoliten
- Rolling stock: 81-717.5/714.5; 81-717.5М/714.5М; 81-775.2/776.2/777.2
- Daily ridership: 1,230,654

History
- Opened: September 11, 1938; 88 years ago
- Last extension: 2018

Technical
- Line length: 42.8 kilometres (26.6 mi)
- Num of tracks: 2
- Character: Underground
- Track gauge: 1,520 mm (4 ft 11 27/32 in)
- Electrification: Third rail
- Operating speed: 80 km/h

The Zamoskvoretskaya line (Russian: Замоскворе́цкая ли́ния, IPA: [zəməskvɐˈrʲɛtskəjə ˈlʲinʲɪjə]), formerly Gorkovsko–Zamoskvoretskaya (Го́рьковско-Замоскворе́цкая) (Line 2; Green Line), is a line of the Moscow Metro in the Moscow Oblast of Russia. Opened in 1938, chronologically it became the third line in the metro system despite being labeled second. There are 24 stations on the Zamoskvoretskaya line, and it spans 42.8 kilometres (26.6 mi), roughly crossing Moscow in a north–south direction. A normal trip along the entire line takes 55 minutes, with the trains on the line averaging 42 kilometres per hour (26 mph). While most of the line is underground, there are some pockets of surface-level or above-ground track, mainly at the point where the line crosses the Moskva River. Many of the line's stations have grand interiors and intricate architectural features and have been classified as objects of cultural heritage.

== History ==
The first stage of the line followed Moscow's busiest transport artery the Leningradsky Prospekt or as it moves into the centre the Tverskaya Street (formally Gorkovskaya hence the original name), and connected the northwestern districts of Aeroport and Begovoy along with the Belorussky Rail Terminal with the city centre in 1938.

The second stage, construction of which continued uninterrupted during World War II, opened in 1943 and followed the Red Square south under the Moskva River into the dense district of Zamoskvorechye (hence the current name) and then onto the Paveletsky Rail Terminal and more significantly the Stalin Factory (ZiS) in the southeast of Moscow.

Several more extensions were to take place including the northern one following the Leningrad Highway and the Moscow Canal into the Northern River Port in 1964. In 1969, the line was extended south towards Nagatino industrial district and the Kolomenskoye park, ultimately reaching Chertanovo Severnoye. In 1979, Tverskaya station was opened on the central segment of Zamoskvoretskaya line, linking it to Tagansko-Krasnopresnenskaya line and later Serpukhovsko-Timiryazevskaya line via transfers to Pushkinskaya and Chekhovskaya stations, respectively.

In 1984, a third southeastern extension connected Kashirskaya station with Tsaritsyno park and into the Orekhovo-Borisovo housing massifs, while the previously built branch towards Chertanovo became a separate Kakhovskaya line. A flooded tunnel, however forced the new branch to close a day after and for the next two and a half months. In late 1985 the second stage was completed, reaching a length of 36.9 kilometres with 20 stations and a daily passenger traffic of 1.8 million people. Since the extension of 1984, the line has mostly remained intact throughout the years besides the construction of Alma-Atinskaya and Tekhnopark stations in the south in 2012–2014 as well as the construction of Khovrino and Belomorskaya stations in the north in 2017–2018.

The line's complex history is mirrored in its architectural ensemble, particularly as it is one of the few places that it is possible to see Soviet pre-war Art Deco architecture. In the spotlight before all other stations is Mayakovskaya, a station that is not only most-photographed in the network but is also common sight on covers of brochures and tour guides into Moscow's underground realm.

When the line first opened in 1938, colour-coding was introduced to distinguish between the three lines of the rapidly-growing Moscow Metro. The first line, Sokolnicheskaya, was colored red, for mostly political reasons. Arbatsko-Pokrovskaya line, which was the second chronologically, was coloured blue, whilst the third one, Zamoskvoretskaya was given green. However, the significance of the Zamoskvoretskaya line was deemed greater, and it was thus awarded the label of being "second". This tradition has since been passed on in all ex-Soviet cities with the first line being red and the second/third being either blue or green. However some metros, notably Minsk Metro chose to deliberately reverse the trend.

From November 2022 to May 2023, the section of the Zamoskvoretskaya line between Avtozavodskaya and Orekhovo was closed for the reconstruction of the tunnel.

=== Timeline ===
Segment	Date opened	Length
Sokol–Teatralnaya	September 11, 1938	8.5 kilometres (5.3 mi)
Teatralnaya–Avtozavodskaya	January 1, 1943	6.2 kilometres (3.9 mi)
Novokuznetskaya, Paveletskaya	November 20, 1943	N/A
Sokol–Rechnoy Vokzal	December 30, 1964	6.2 kilometres (3.9 mi)
Avtozavodskaya–Kakhovskaya	August 11, 1969	9.5 kilometres (5.9 mi)
Tverskaya	July 20, 1979	N/A
Kashirskaya–Orekhovo	December 30, 1984	6.4 kilometres (4.0 mi)
Orekhovo–Krasnogvardeyskaya	September 7, 1985	3.4 kilometres (2.1 mi)
Kashirskaya–Kakhovskaya detached	November 20, 1995	-3.4 kilometres (2.1 mi)
Krasnogvardeyskaya–Alma-Atinskaya	December 24, 2012	3.09 kilometres (1.92 mi)
Tekhnopark	December 28, 2015	N/A
Rechnoy Vokzal–Khovrino	December 31, 2017	5.9 kilometres (3.7 mi)
Belomorskaya	December 20, 2018	N/A
Total	24 stations	42.8 kilometres (26.6 mi)

=== Name changes ===
Station	Previous name(s)	Years
Tverskaya	Gorkovskaya	1979–1990
Teatralnaya	Ploshchad Sverdlova	1938–1990
Avtozavodskaya	Zavod Imeni Stalina	1943–1957
Tsaritsyno	Lenino	1984–1990

== Transfers ==
#	Transfer to	At
1	Sokolnicheskaya line	Teatralnaya
3	Arbatsko-Pokrovskaya line	Teatralnaya
5	Koltsevaya line	Belorusskaya, Paveletskaya
6	Kaluzhsko-Rizhskaya line	Novokuznetskaya
7	Tagansko-Krasnopresnenskaya line	Tverskaya
8	Kalininskaya line	Novokuznetskaya
9	Serpukhovsko-Timiryazevskaya line	Tverskaya
10	Lyublinsko-Dmitrovskaya line	Zyablikovo
11	Bolshaya Koltsevaya line	Kashirskaya
11 11A	Bolshaya Koltsevaya line	Petrovsky Park

The Kashirskaya transfer is a cross-platform one.

== Rolling stock ==
The line is served by the Sokol (No 2) and Zamoskvoretskoe (No 7) depots to which, respectively, 39 and 36 eight-carriage are assigned. The line began receiving 81-714/717 trains in 1980, replacing older E types in a programme which was finished in 1987. Some of these were upgraded to the .5 standard. When the Kakhovskaya branch separated from the main line, seven six-carriage trains were formed for it at the Zamoskvoretskoe depot.

Subway car types used on the line over the years:

Type	Dates
Series A, B	1938–1951
Series V	1949–1954
Series G	1947–1965
Series E	1963–1989
Series Ezh, Em-508 and Em-509	1970–1989
Series Ezh3/Em-508T	1978–1983
Series 81-717	1979–2024
Series 81-717.5	1988–present
Series 81-717.5M	2008–present
Series 81-775.2	2024–present

== Recent events and future plans ==
Today the line features a combination of stations that were built during different periods and some rebuilt since. Also it is one of the busiest in the system and for some stations, that are almost 70 years old clearly show their age. Improvement works have been carried out several times throughout history, but in recent times their emphasis has grown. Belorusskaya was recently subjected to an extensive facelift reconstruction on replacement of its old ceramic walls with new marble ones. The world famous Mayakovskaya station following the opening of the second exit in 2005 had its original vestibule closed for replacement of escalators. It is expected that additional reconstruction will be done on 1960s "centipede" stations including the replacement of old ceramic tiles with aluminium planes.

When the line was built several areas were left with a straight tunnel provision for potential future built in of new stations. One of which was Gorkovskaya (now Tverskaya) between Mayakovskaya and Teatralnaya, which was opened in 1979. However several more remain: Sovetskaya between Tverskaya and Teatralnaya, Bega between Dinamo and Belorusskaya, Vishnyakovsky Pereulok between Novokuznetskaya and Paveletskaya and Moskvorechye (also referred to as Vasilyevsky Spusk) between Teatralnaya and Novokuznetskaya. The latter provision stands the highest chance of being developed as the vacant space caused by demolition of the Rossiya Hotel is likely to be filled with new office buildings and hotels.

In addition to the provisions, another station was recently approved to be built on the surface level track between Avtozavodskaya and Kolomenskaya. The provisional names were Nagatinsky Zaton or Prospekt Andropova, although the name Tekhnopark was selected. The station opened in late 2015.

The Metro completed the northern extension to Khovrino in 2017, making that station the northern terminus of the line. Belomorskaya, an intermediate station, opened on December 20, 2018. The extension creates the potential to further extend the line into the adjacent Moscow Oblast town of Khimki.
