= Orekhovo-Borisovo Severnoye District =

- District
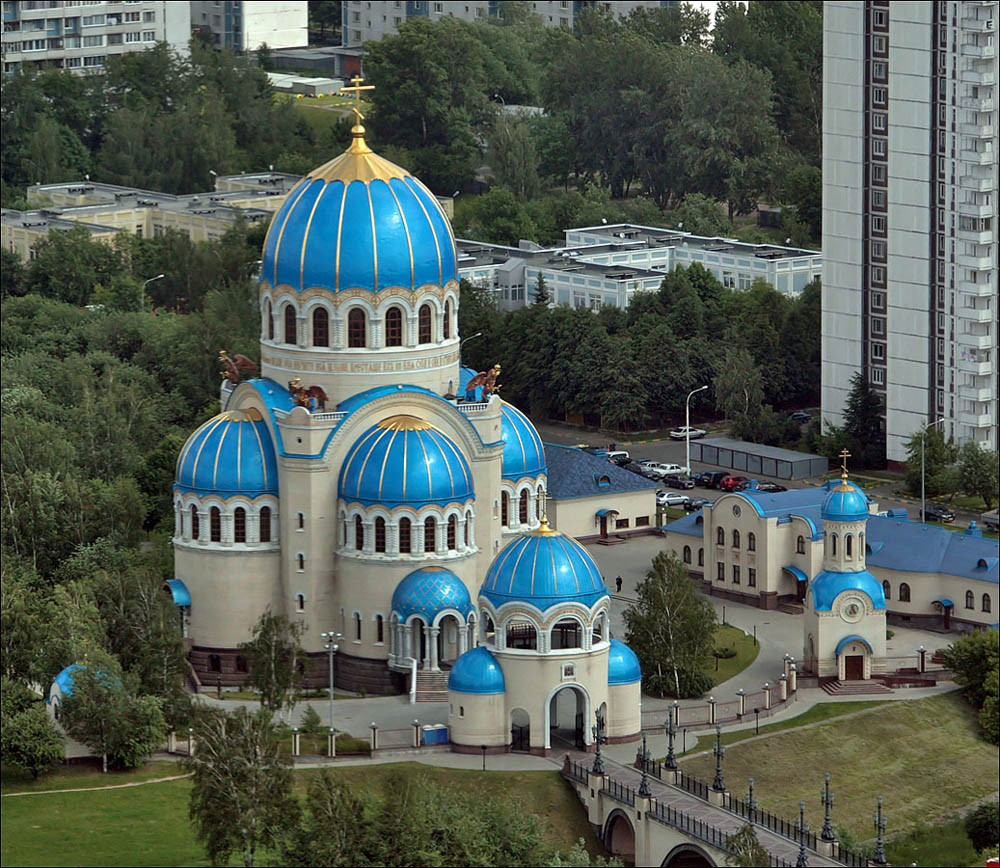
- Holy Trinity Church in Orekhovo-Borisovo

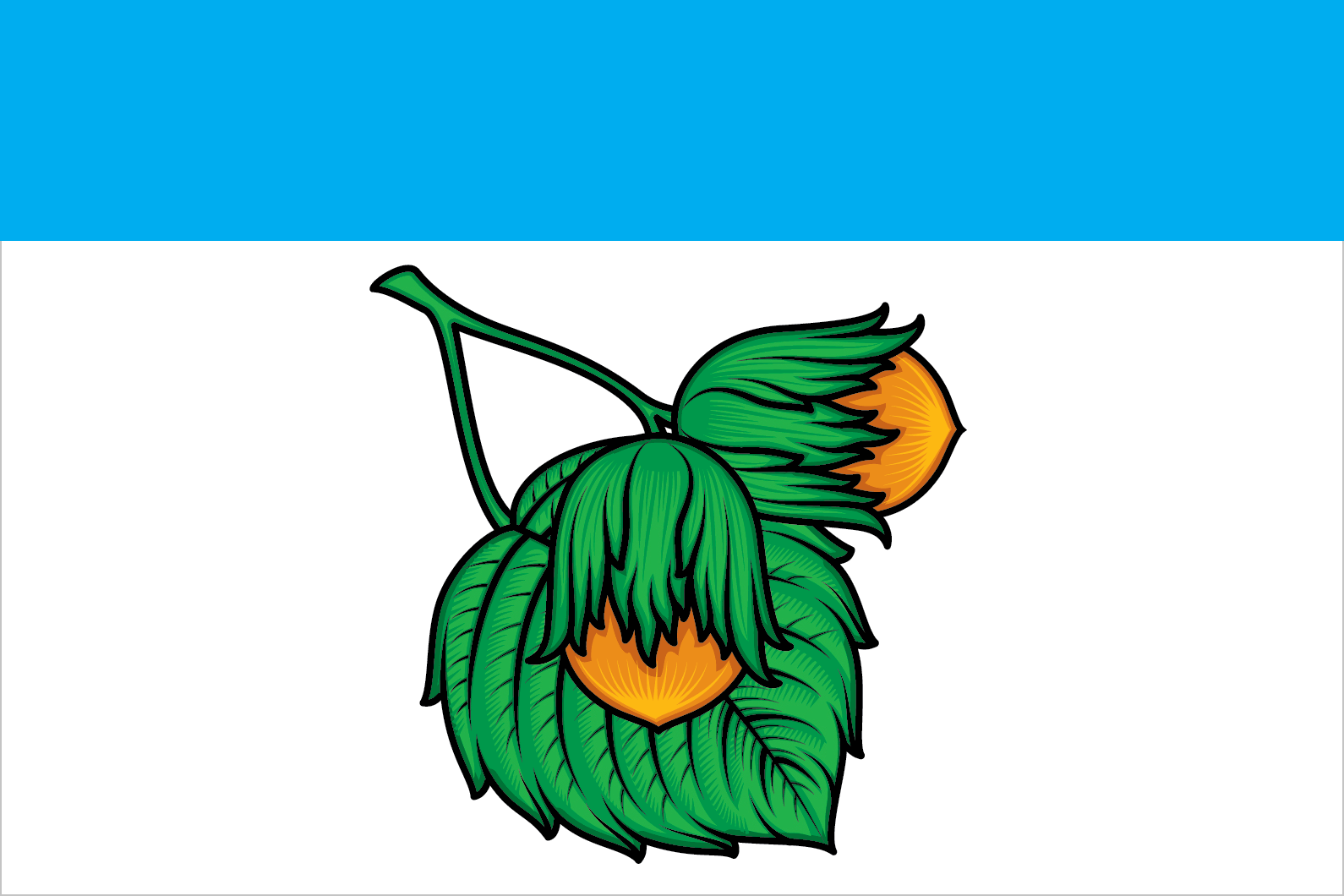
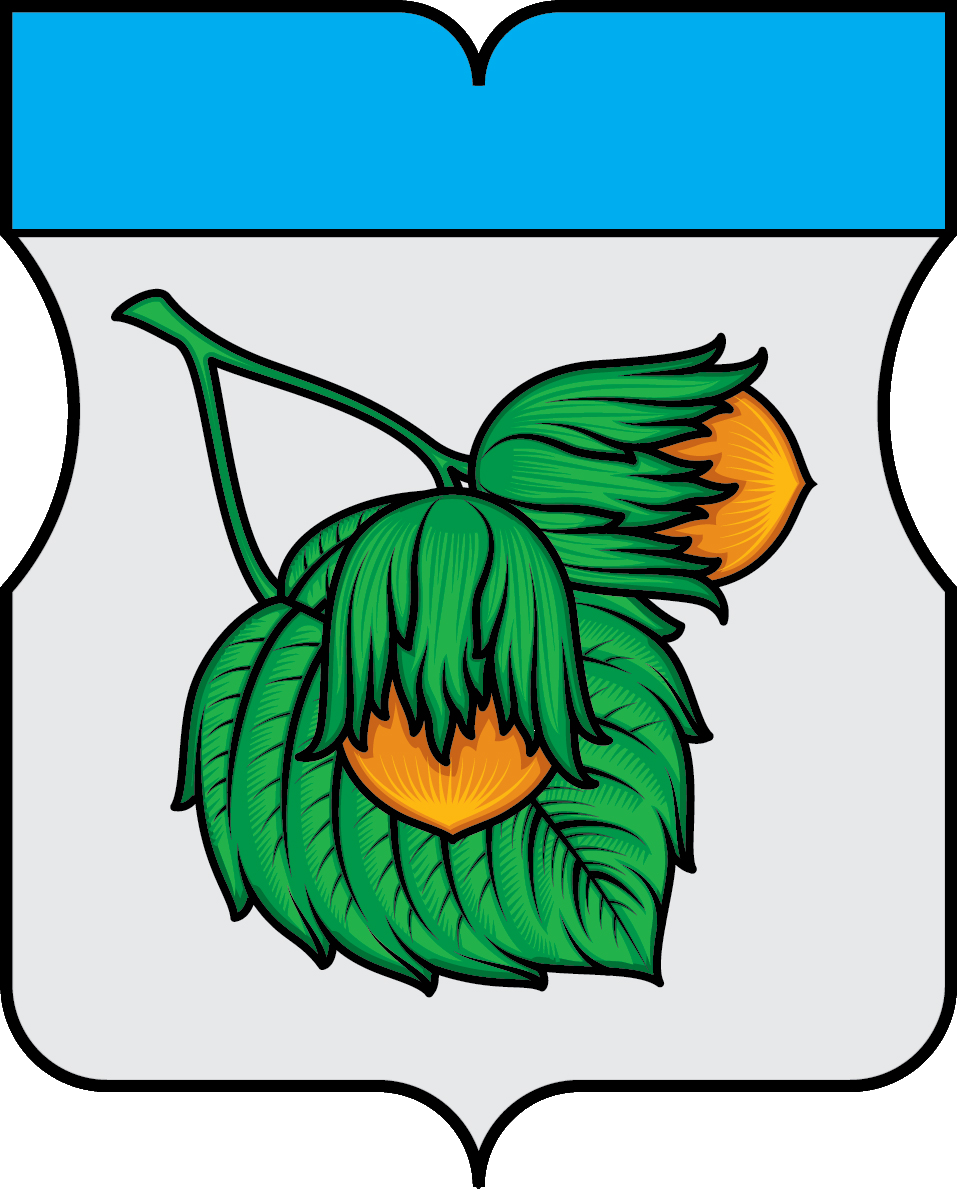
- Flag Coat of arms
- Location of Orekhovo-Borisovo Severnoye District on the map of Moscow
- Coordinates: 55°37′06″N 37°42′00″E
- Country: Russia
- Federal subject: Moscow

Area
  - Total: 7.540 km^{2} (2.911 sq mi)
- Time zone: UTC+
- OKTMO ID: 45921000
- Website: https://sevorehovo-borisovo.mos.ru/

Orekhovo-Borisovo Severnoye District (Russian: райо́н Оре́хово-Бори́сово Се́верное), commonly known as Orekhovo-Borisovo, is a district in Southern Administrative Okrug of Moscow, Russia, located on the spot of former villages of Orekhovo, Borisovo, Shipilovo, Zyablikovo, and Brateyevo. In the early 1970s, mass housing construction was started in the area, and a microdistrict was built. Its main landmark is the Orekhovo-Borisovo Cathedral. The area of the district is 7.540 square kilometres (2.911 mi^{2}).

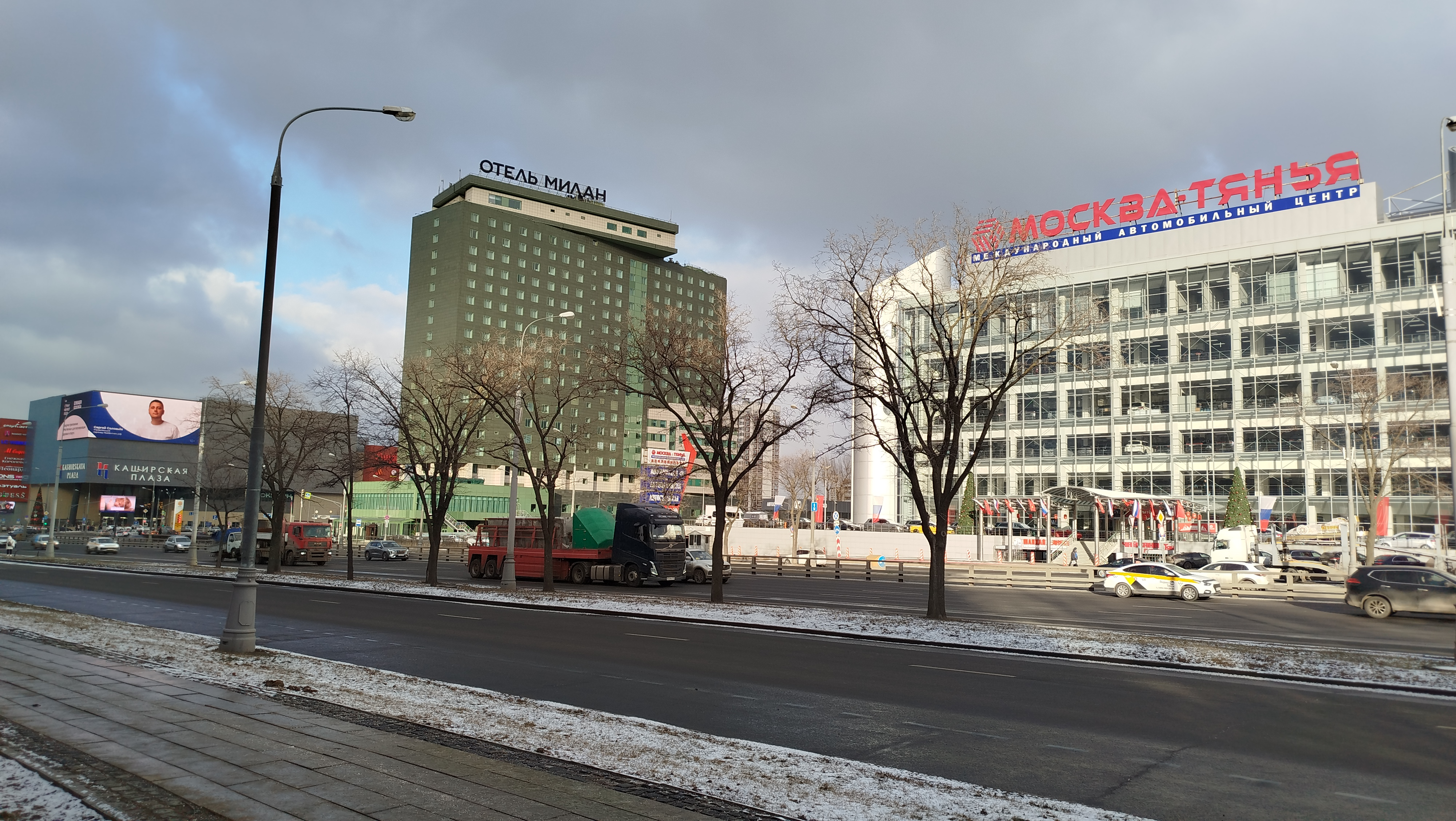
Kashirskaya Plaza (left), "Milan" hotel and "Moskva-Tyanya" autocentrer (right)
