= Alma-Atinskaya (Moscow Metro) =

Moscow Metro station

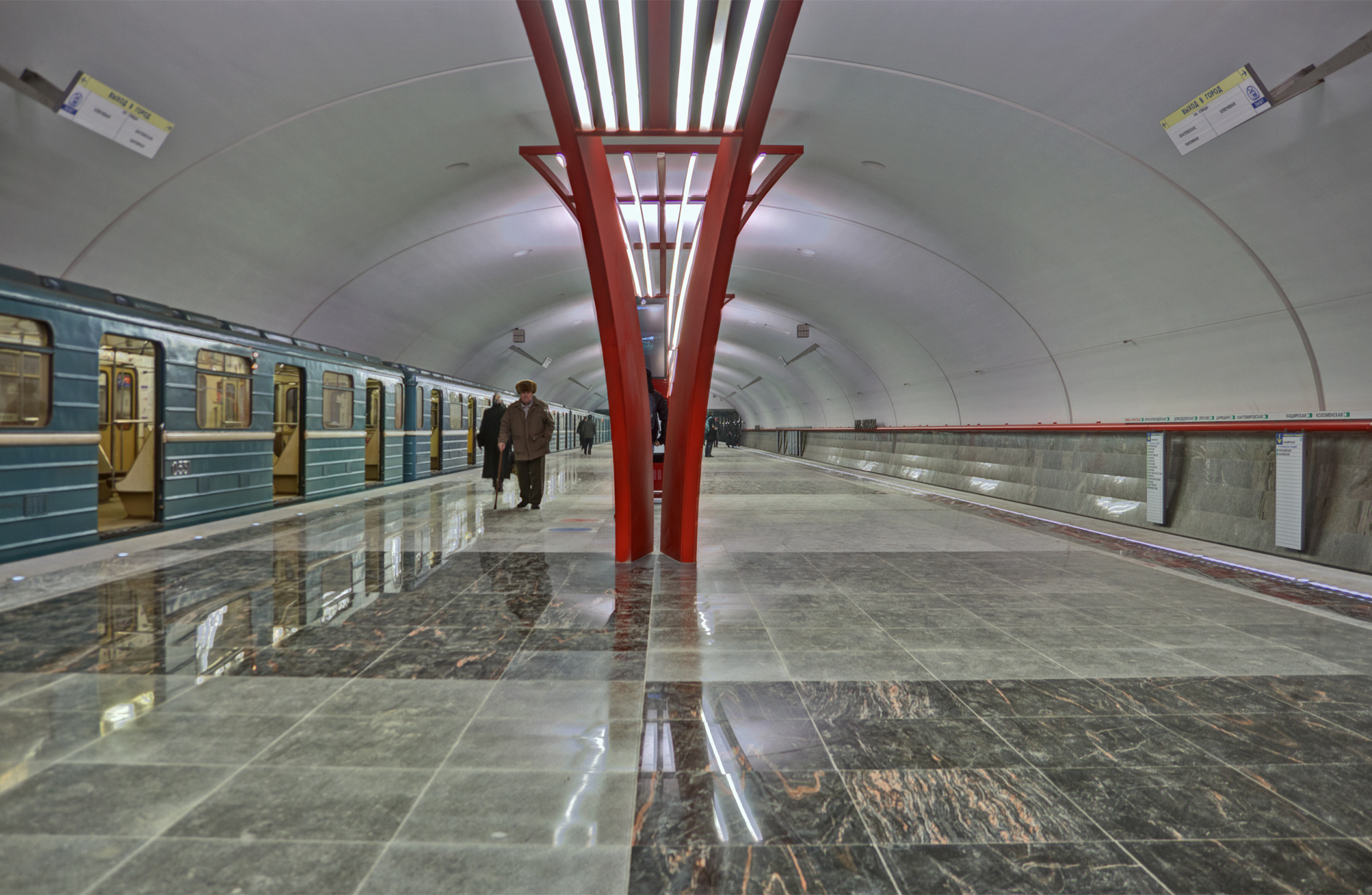

General information
- Location: Brateyevo District; Southern Administrative Okrug; Moscow; Russia
- Coordinates: 55.6326°N 37.7660°E
- System: Moscow Metro station
- Owner: Moskovsky Metropoliten
- Line: Zamoskvoretskaya line
- Platforms: 1 bay platform
- Tracks: 2
- Connections: Bus: с710, с797, с827, с838, 864, 887.

Construction
- Depth: 10 metres (33 ft)
- Platform levels: 1
- Parking: No
- Accessible: Yes

History
- Opened: 24 December 2012; 13 years ago

Services
Preceding station	Moscow Metro	Following station
Krasnogvardeyskaya towards Khovrino	Zamoskvoretskaya line	Terminus
Route map
Location
- Location within Moscow Metro

Alma-Atinskaya (Russian: Алма́-Ати́нская) is a southern terminus station of the Zamoskvoretskaya Line of the Moscow Metro. The station was opened on 24 December 2012.

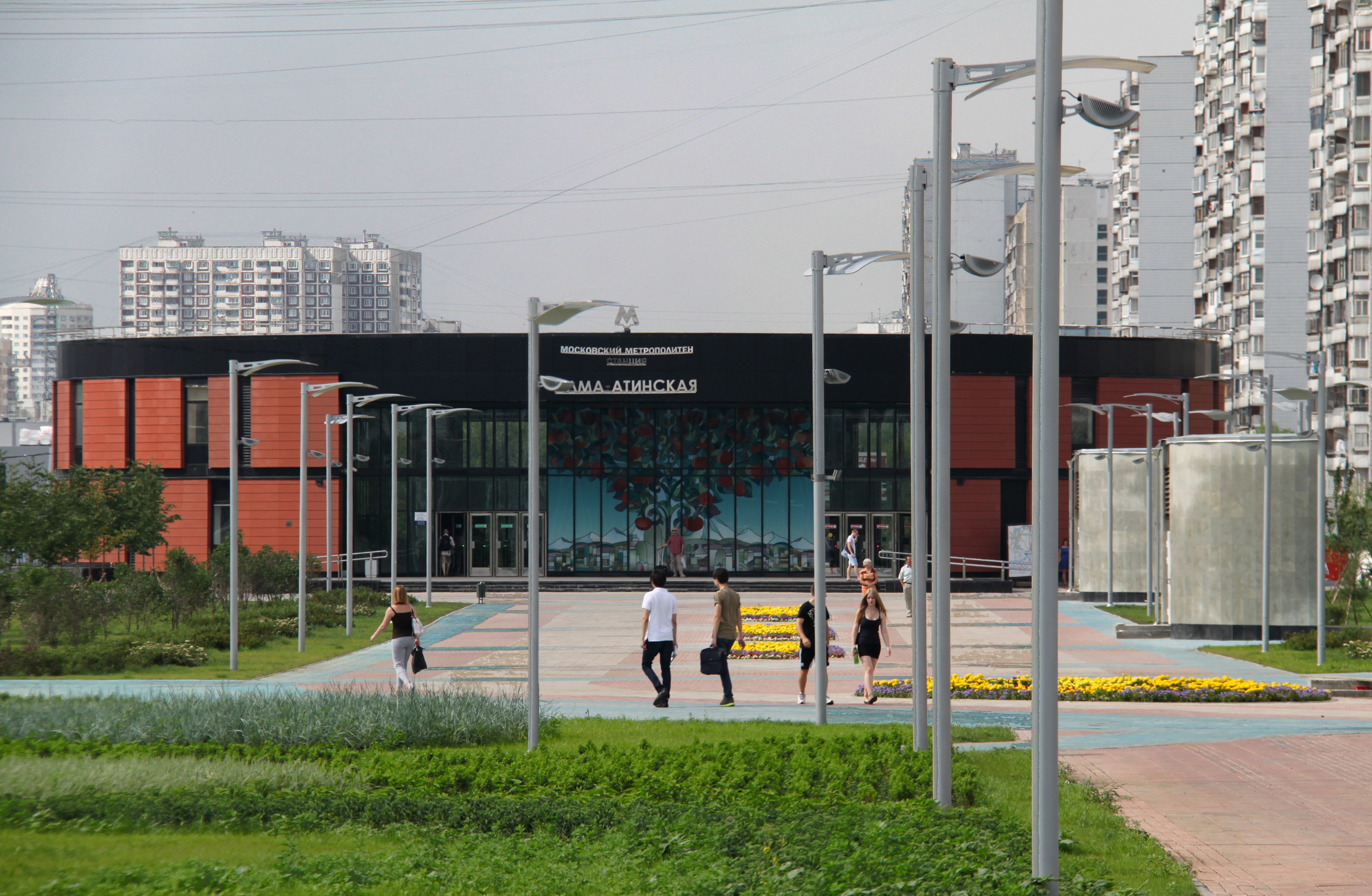
Above-ground vestibule

On 29 November 2011 Moscow government decided to rename the station from "Brateyevo" (Russian: Брате́ево) into "Alma-Atinskaya" after the Russian name of the city of Almaty, former capital of Kazakhstan. The change reflects the rename of "Molodyozhnaya" station of Almaty Metro, still under construction in 2012, to Moskva station as a sign of friendship between Russia and Kazakhstan.

== Location ==
The station located in the Brateyevo District. Entrances are near Brateyevskaya, Paromnaya and Klyuchevaya streets (In English: Brateyevo, Ferry and Sourse streets).

Track diagram (2013-2023)
