= Voykovsky =

Voykovsky (masculine), Voykovskaya (feminine), or Voykovskoye (neuter) may refer to:

- Voykovsky District, a district in Northern Administrative Okrug of the federal city of Moscow, Russia
- Voykovsky (rural locality), a rural locality (a settlement) in Sorochinsky District of Orenburg Oblast, Russia
- Voikovskyi (Voykovsky), an urban-type settlement in Amvrosiivka Raion of Donetsk Oblast, Ukraine
- Voykovskaya (Moscow Metro), a station of the Moscow Metro, Moscow, Russia
- Voykovskaya, an originally proposed name for Baltiyskaya, a station of the Moscow Central Circle of the Moscow Metro, Moscow, Russia
