= Leningradskoye Highway =

Road in Russia

Coordinates: 55°50′41″N 37°28′38″E

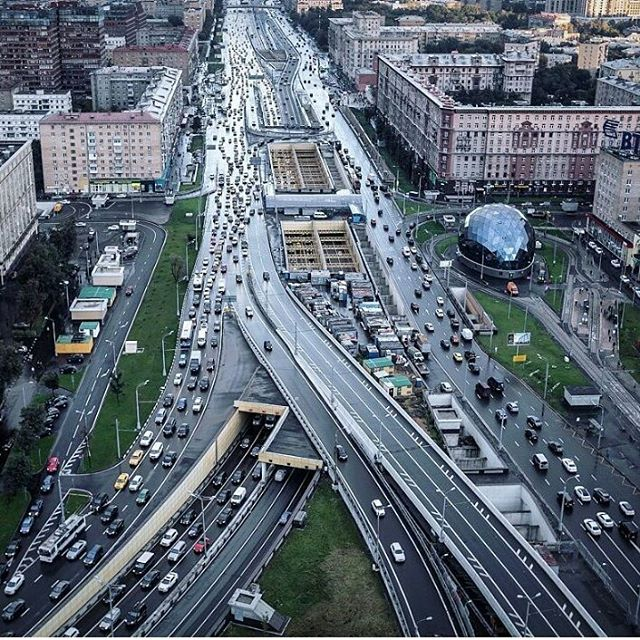
- Native name: Ленинградское шоссе (Russian)
- Length: 19.7 km (12.2 mi)
- Location: Moscow; Northern Administrative Okrug
- Nearest metro station: Voykovskaya; Vodny Stadion; Rechnoi Vokzal; Baltiyskaya

Leningradskoye Highway (Russian: Ленинградское шоссе) is a part of the M10 federal highway Moscow – Saint Petersburg inside Moscow. One of the major thruways of Russia's capital, it connects Moscow with several large commuter towns such as Khimki and Zelenograd, as well as with Sheremetyevo Airport.

== Route ==
Leningradskoye Highway begins in Sokol District in Northern Administrative Okrug where it derives from Leningradsky Avenue along with Volokolamskoye Highway. The highway follows northwestbound, crosses Rizshkaya Railway and goes along the border between Voykovsky District and Koptevo District.

After crossing Small railway ring Leningradskoye Highway enters Golovinsky District. There is an interchange with Golovinskoye Highway near Vodny Stadion metro station. Until 2008 this crossing was served by traffic lights. That was the last traffic light on the highway.

After crossing Flotskaya Street the highway follows across Levobereznhy District. There is a cloverleaf interchange with Belomorskaya Street. The highway crosses the Moscow Canal, MKAD and enters Urban Okrug Khimki in Moscow Oblast. There it crosses Yubileyiny Prospekt, Mayakovsky street, Novoskhodnenskoye Highway, Mashkinskoye Highway, and 9th May street, and returns to Northern Administrative Okrug near MEGA shopping center.

In Molzhaninovsky District Mezhdunarodnoye Highway derives from Leningradskoye Highway and heads towards terminals D, E, and F of Sheremetyevo International Airport. Oktyabrskaya Railway goes under this interchange. After Sheremetyevskoye Highway derives from Leningradskoye Highway towards terminals A, B, and C, Leningradskoe Highway enters back to Moscow Oblast and follows towards Zelenograd.

== See also ==
- Leningradsky Avenue
