= Rechnoy Vokzal =

Rechnoy Vokzal (Russian: Речной вокзал, lit. 'River terminal') may refer to:

- Rechnoy Vokzal (Moscow Metro), a station of the Zamoskvoretskaya Line of the Moscow Metro
- Rechnoy Vokzal (Novosibirsk Metro), a station of the Leninskaya Line of the Novosibirsk Metro
- North River Terminal, Moscow
