= Vodny Stadion =

Vodny Stadion may refer to:

- Dinamo (water stadium), opened in 1935 at the Khimki Reservoir on the Moskva River, Russia; namesake of the Vodny Stadion metro station
- Vodny Stadion (Moscow Metro), metro station in Moscow, Russia
- Vodny Stadion (territory), a former territorial subdivision in Moscow, Russia, located between the Khimki Reservoir and Leningradskoye Highway
