= Moscow Regular River Transport =

Water transportation system in Moscow, Russia

Moscow Regular River Transport Регулярный речной транспорт Москвы
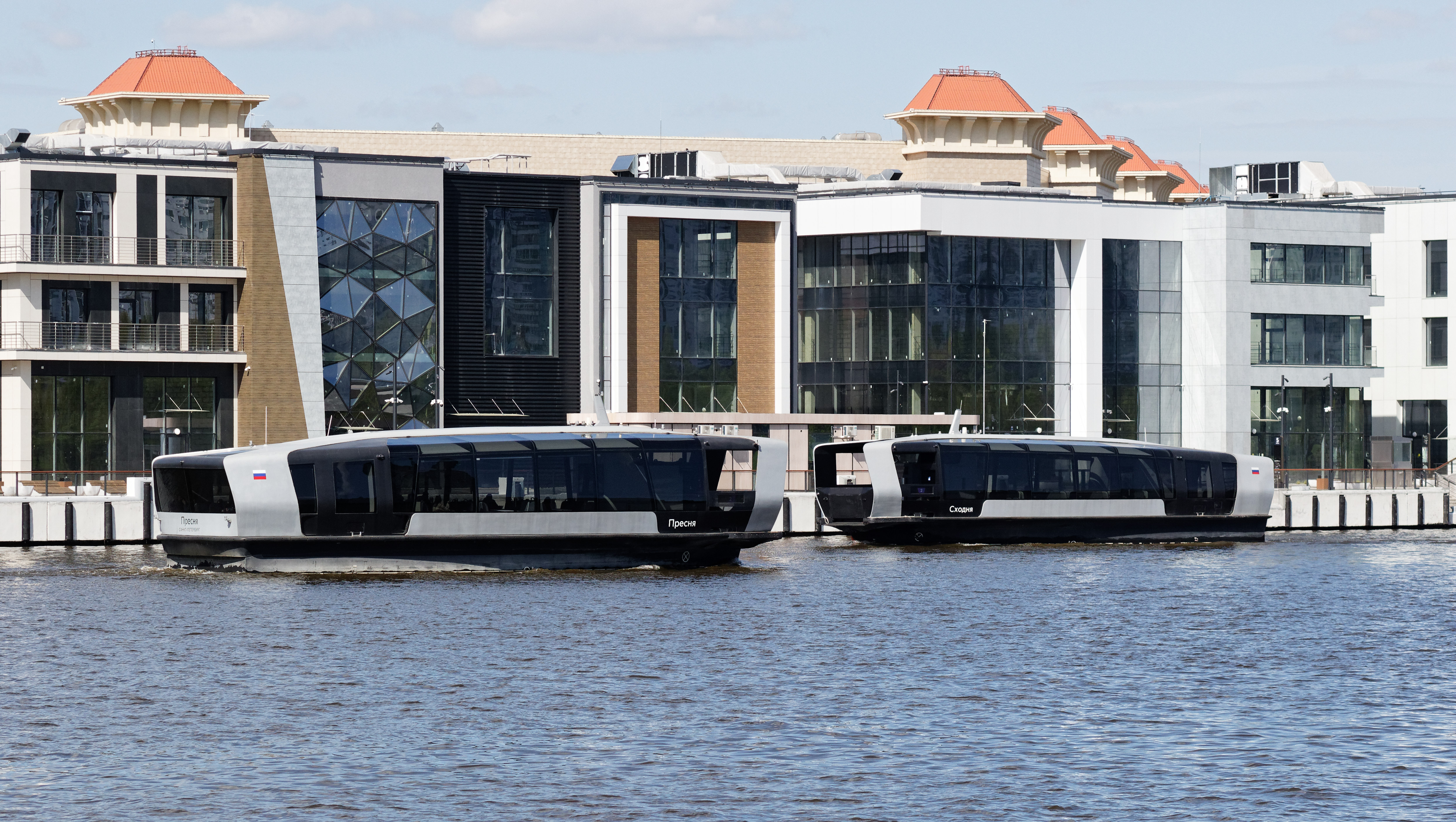
- Water trams Skhodnya and Presnya
- Locale: Moscow
- Waterway: Moskva River, Moscow Canal
- Transit type: Passenger river tram
- Owner: Government of Moscow
- Operator: Vodohod
- Began operation: 20 June 2023; 3 years ago
- No. of lines: 4
- No. of vessels: 30
- No. of terminals: 24
- Website: t.mos.ru/reka

The Moscow Regular River Transport (Russian: Регулярный речной транспорт Москвы) network is a water transportation system that operates year-round river tram services along the Moskva River. The system is operated by Vodohod for the Government of Moscow and is integrated into the cities public transportation system.

The network is claimed to be the worlds first year-round fully electric river tram service.

== History ==
Following the collapse of the Soviet Union, former state-owned river tramvaichiki were either purchased by private operators, or were simply abandoned. Passenger operators using Raketa hydrofoil boats ended in 2006, with only tourist services remaining.

In 2020, the Government of Moscow led by Sergei Sobyanin supported an initiative for the revival of regular river services. The first line between Fili Park and Kievsky was planned to be opened by the end of 2020, but was delayed by the COVID-19 pandemic.

In 2021 the first Project TFRP.401 electric tram was unveiled, constructed by the Saint Petersburg based Emperium Shipyard, specialising in environmentally friendly electric passenger vessels. Based on an online vote on the "Active Citizen" platform, the first tram was named Sinichka. In December, the Government of Moscow signed an agreement with Vodohod for the provision of passenger vessels, berths and associated infrastructure.

In March 2022, sea trials took place along the Moskva River. The executive director of Emperium Denis Tkachev stated that the network was largely unaffected by potential sanctions, with the majority of components being sourced from either domestic Russian or able to be easily substituted with Chinese imports.

While originally envisaged to launch on 1 July 2022, the network officially opened on 20 June 2023, on the 100th anniversary of the first Soviet river trams in 1923.

== Routes ==
=== Current ===
==== 1. Kievsky - Fili Park ====
Opened on 20 June 2023. Further berths are planned in West Port, Melkombinat, Sydney City, Karamyshevsky and Nizhnie Mnevniki.

==== 2. ZIL - Pechatniki ====
Opened on 29 September 2023.

==== 3. ZIL - Novospassky ====
Opened on 20 June 2025. A second berth is planned near ZIL.

==== 4. Kievsky - Luzhniki ====
Opened on 7 June 2026. Links Moscow Kievsky Railway Station and Luzhniki Stadium.

=== Future ===
According to the mayor of Moscow Sergei Sobyanin, a network of 7 routes with 67 landings, serviced by 60 water trams is envisioned by 2030.

==== 5. Khoroshyovo-Mnyovnik -SberCity ====
Planned opening by 2027 to 2030. New berths are planned in Khoroshevo-Mnevniki, Serebryany Bor - 3, Scarlet Sails, Spartak, Streshnevo, Knikotazhny, Volokolamsky, Pavshinskaya Floodplain, Zhivopisny, Myakinino, Rublevo-Arkhangelskoye and SberCity.

SberCity is not to be confused with the Sberbank City office complex on route 1.

==== 6. North River Terminal - Lighthouse ====
Planned opening by 2030 operating along the Moscow Canal. New berths are planned at the North River Terminal, Zakharovo, Belmomorskaya, Northern Tushino, Levoberezhny, Khimki and Lighthouse.

==== 7. Kievsky - Novospassky ====
Planned opening by 2030, connecting routes 1 and 4 to route 3. New berths are planned in Savvinskiy, Luzhniki, Sparrow Hills, Neskuchny Garden, Krymsky Bridge, Muzeon, Red October and Zaryadye Park.

== Fares ==
The network is integrated into the public transport network in Moscow. As a result, fares can be paid using a variety of options including Troika card, bank card, Moscow Resident Social Card, Mir Pay or biometric payment through Face Pay. The network of floating piers is accessible to the public, with turnstiles located on the boarding ramps.

== Fleet ==
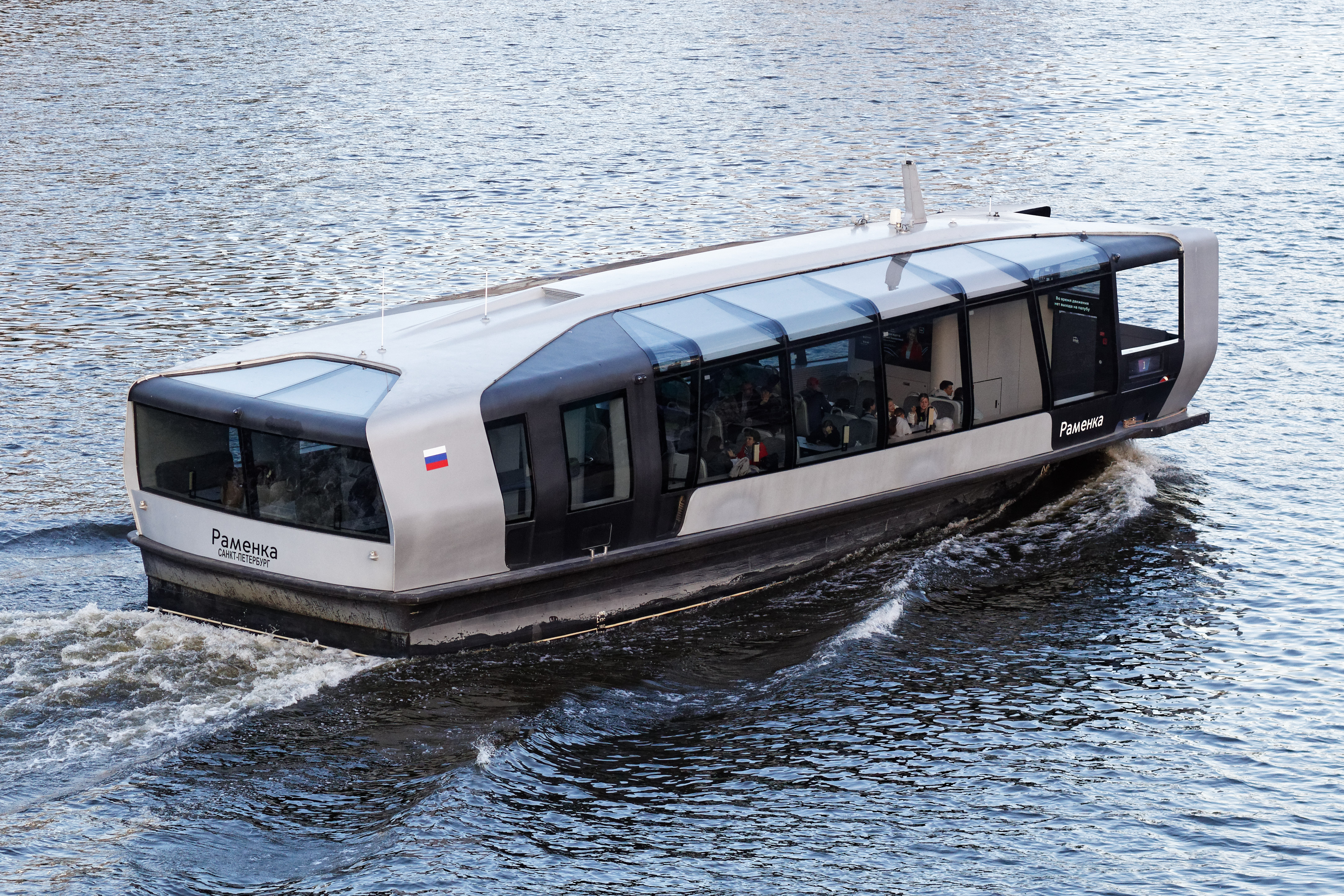
Project TFRP.401 electric water tram Ramenka

Transport is provided by Project TFRP.401 catamaran electric water trams developed and built by Emperium and operated by Vodohod. The vessels are propelled by electric motors powered by lithium iron phosphate batteries with a maximum speed of 12 knots. Each vessel as a crew of two and a passenger capacity of up to 80 passengers with 42 seated, equipped with information screens, Qi wireless chargers and power sockets. Free wireless internet services are available onboard. A toilet and a water dispenser is located on board. Facilities for the stowage of e-scooters and bicycles are available.

In late 2025, the new Moskovskaya Verf shipyard was opened in Nagatinsky Zaton. On 26 May 2026, the first four Moskva 1.0 class ships were launched.

=== Current vessels ===
TFRP.401

- Bitsa
- Businka
- Chechora
- Desna
- Filka
- Gorodnya
- Grachyovka
- Kamenka
- Khimka
- Khodynka
- Koryushka
- Kotlovka
- Kuznetsovka
- Lyuberka
- Neglinka
- Ochakovka
- Pekhorka
- Presnya
- Ramenka
- Serebryanka
- Setun
- Shmelevka
- Sinichka
- Skhodnya
- Yauza
- Zhuzha

Moskva 1.0

- Maroseika
- Polyanka
- Taganka
- Yakimanka

== Landings ==
Landings are made up of either a small or large sheltered floating pier. Piers are climate controlled with bathroom facilities, with large size piers additionally equipped with a cafe and electric charging. Large piers are accommodate up to 80 passengers while small piers can accommodate 40 passengers.

Route(s)	Name		Opening date	Image	Transfers
Route(s)	English	Russian	Opening date	Image	Transfers
1	Fili Park	Парк «Фили»	6 June 2024		#4 Filyovskaya line
1	Heart of the City	Сердце Столицы	20 June 2023		#14 Moscow Central Circle #17 Rublyovo-Arkhangelskaya line
1	Beregovoy	Береговой	6 June 2024		
1	Kutuzovskaya	Кутузовский	20 June 2023		#4 Filyovskaya line #14 Moscow Central Circle #D4 Line D4 (Moscow Central Diameters)
1	City - Central	Сити-Центральный	20 June 2023		#4A Filyovskaya line #8A Solntsevskaya line #17 Rublyovo-Arkhangelskaya line
1	City - Bagration	Сити-Багратион	20 June 2023		
1	Krasnopresnenskaya Park	Краснопресненский парк	3 September 2024		
1	Three Hills	Трёхгорный	20 June 2023		
1, 4	Kievsky	Киевский	20 June 2023		#3 Arbatsko-Pokrovskaya line #4 Filyovskaya line #4A Filyovskaya line #5 Koltsevaya line #D4 Line D4 (Moscow Central Diameters)
4	Luzhniki	Лужники	7 June 2026		
3	Novospassky	Новоспасский	20 June 2025		#7 Tagansko-Krasnopresnenskaya line #10 Lyublinsko-Dmitrovskaya line
3	Derbenevskaya Embankment	Дербеневская набережная	20 June 2025		#2 Zamoskvoretskaya line #5 Koltsevaya line #D5 Line D5 (Moscow Central Diameters)
3	Torpedo	Торпедо	20 June 2025		
3	Simonovsky	Симоновский	20 June 2025		#2 Zamoskvoretskaya line #14 Moscow Central Circle
3	Avtozavodsky Bridge	Автозаводский мост	29 September 2023		#9 Serpukhovsko-Timiryazevskaya line
2, 3	ZIL	ЗИЛ	29 September 2023		#14 Moscow Central Circle #16 Troitskaya line #18 Biryulyovskaya line
2	Nagatinsky	Нагатинский	3 September 2024		#9 Serpukhovsko-Timiryazevskaya line
2	Novinki Backwater	Затон Новинки	3 September 2024		#2 Zamoskvoretskaya line #18 Biryulyovskaya line
2	Klenoviy Bulvar	Кленовый бульвар	29 September 2023		#2 Zamoskvoretskaya line #11 Bolshaya Koltsevaya line
2	South River Terminal	Южный речной вокзал	29 September 2023		#2 Zamoskvoretskaya line #18 Biryulyovskaya line
2	Moscow Shipyard	Московская	20 June 2025		
2	Nagatinsky Backwater	Нагатинский Затон	29 September 2023		#11 Bolshaya Koltsevaya line
2	Kolomenskaya Embankment	Коломенская набережная	3 September 2024		
2	Pechatniki	Печатники	29 September 2023		#10 Lyublinsko-Dmitrovskaya line #11 Bolshaya Koltsevaya line #D2 Line D2 (Moscow Central Diameters)

== See also ==
- Transport in Moscow
