= Voykovskaya (Moscow Metro) =

Moscow Metro station

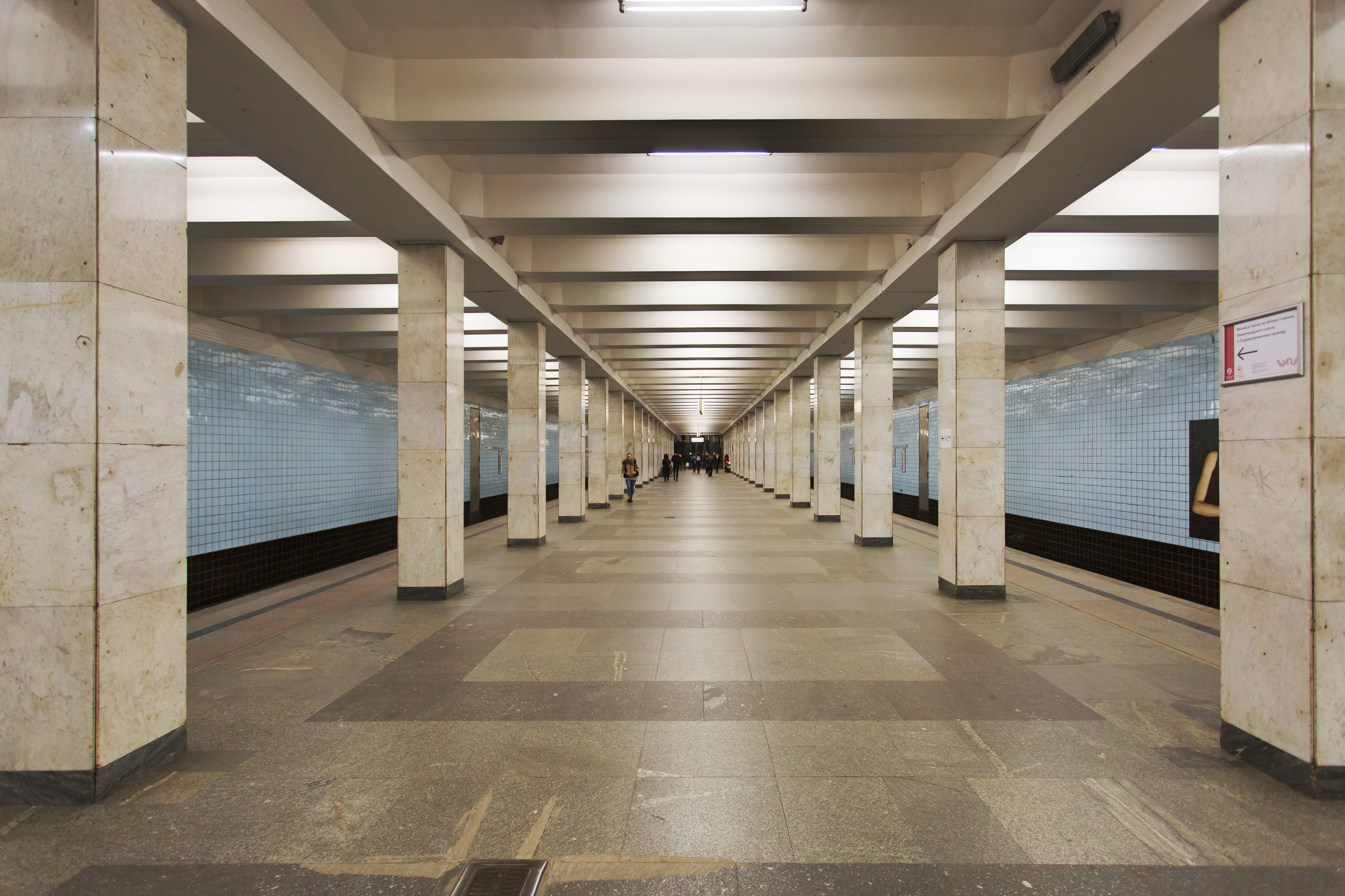

General information
- Location: Voykovsky District; Northern Administrative Okrug; Moscow; Russia
- Coordinates: 55.8190°N 37.4980°E
- System: Moscow Metro station
- Owner: Moskovsky Metropoliten
- Line: Zamoskvoretskaya line
- Platforms: 1 island platform
- Tracks: 2
- Connections: Bus: 90, 114, 179, 191, 204, 282, 780; Trolleybus: 6, 43, 57; Tram: 23, 27, 30

Construction
- Depth: 7 metres (23 ft)
- Platform levels: 1
- Parking: No

Other information
- Station code: 039

History
- Opened: 31 December 1964; 61 years ago

Passengers
- 2002: 36,390,500

Services
Preceding station	Moscow Metro	Following station
Vodny Stadion towards Khovrino	Zamoskvoretskaya line	Sokol towards Alma-Atinskaya
Out-of-station interchange
Streshnevo anticlockwise / outer	Moscow Central Circle transfer at Baltiyskaya	Koptevo clockwise / inner
Route map
Location
- Location within Moscow Metro

Voykovskaya (Russian: Во́йковская) is a Moscow Metro station on the Zamoskvoretskaya Line. It was opened on 31 December 1964 along with two neighbouring stations to the north, Vodny Stadion and Rechnoy Vokzal. Passengers may make out-of-station transfers to Baltiyskaya station on the Moscow Central Circle; however, the walk between stations can take more than 20 minutes.

It was built according to the standardized pillar-trispan design, which was widely used in the 1960s as a cost-saving measure. The station's architects were I. Petukhova and A. Fokina. The entrance of the station is under the M10 highway.

== Name ==
The station is named in honor of Pyotr Voykov, a prominent Bolshevik and Soviet diplomat. Voykov was assassinated in 1927 by a White Russian monarchist; however, his reported involvement in the execution of the family of the last Russian emperor Nicholas II led Russian Orthodox Church groups to push to rename the station.

The city held a vote on its “Active Citizen” platform in November 2015 to consider a name change. By a vote of 53% to 35%, the residents decided to maintain the Voykovskaya name.

Baltiyskaya was originally slated to be named Voykovskaya; however, a similar vote on “Active Citizen” showed only 19% in favor of the name.

== Gallery ==
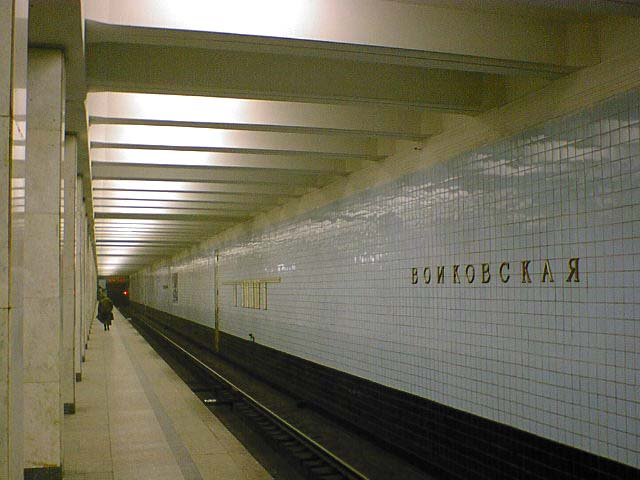
Platform
