= Belomorskaya (Moscow Metro) =

Moscow Metro station

Belomorskaya Беломорская
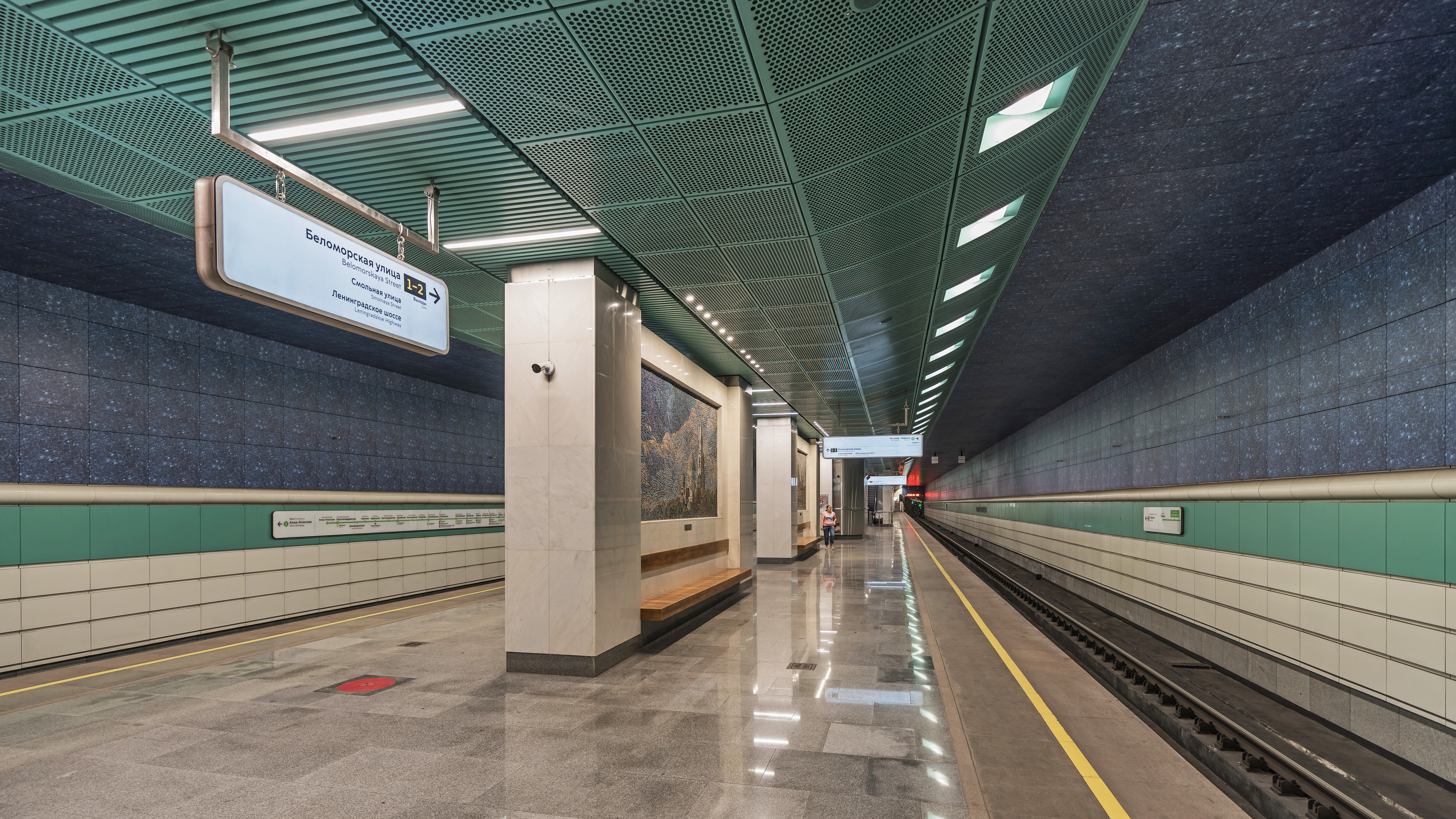

General information
- Location: Levoberezhny District; Northern Administrative Okrug; Moscow; Russia
- Coordinates: 55.865833°N 37.476388°E
- System: Moscow Metro station
- Owner: Moskovsky Metropoliten
- Line: Zamoskvoretskaya line
- Platforms: 1 island platform
- Tracks: 2

Construction
- Structure type: Shallow column station
- Depth: 39.6 metres (130 ft)
- Platform levels: 1

History
- Opened: 20 December 2018; 7 years ago

Services
Preceding station	Moscow Metro	Following station
Khovrino Terminus	Zamoskvoretskaya line	Rechnoy Vokzal towards Alma-Atinskaya
Route map
Location
- Location within Moscow Metro

Belomorskaya (Russian: Беломорская) is a station on the Zamoskvoretskaya line of the Moscow Metro. It was opened on 20 December 2018. It is located between Rechnoy Vokzal (south) and Khovrino (north). Belomorskaya was completed while the stretch between Rechnoy Vokzal and Khovrino was already in operation.

== Name ==
It is named after Belomorskaya Street (Belomorskaya Ulitsa) in Moscow. The street is named after White Sea (Белое море, Byeloye morye) because of locating on the north of Moscow.

== History ==
The station first appeared in plans to extend the Zamoskvoretskaya line in 1957. In 1959, the plan to extend the line was confirmed by the Council of Ministers of the Soviet Union, but the terminus of the Gorkovsko–Zamoskvoretskaya line was set at Rechnoy Vokzal.

In 1970, the system considered extending the line to Levoberezhnaya, a stop on the October Railway. A 1973 plan proposed three new stations: Belomorskaya, Ulitsa Dybenko and Levoberezhnaya. A separate idea emerged in 1978 to add the extension on the Serpukhovsko-Timiryazevskaya Line rather than the Gorkovsko–Zamoskvoretskaya line.

Eventually, by the 1990s the initial plan to extend the line to Levoberezhnaya was scrapped; however an extension to Ulitsa Dybenko (now Khovrino) remained under consideration.

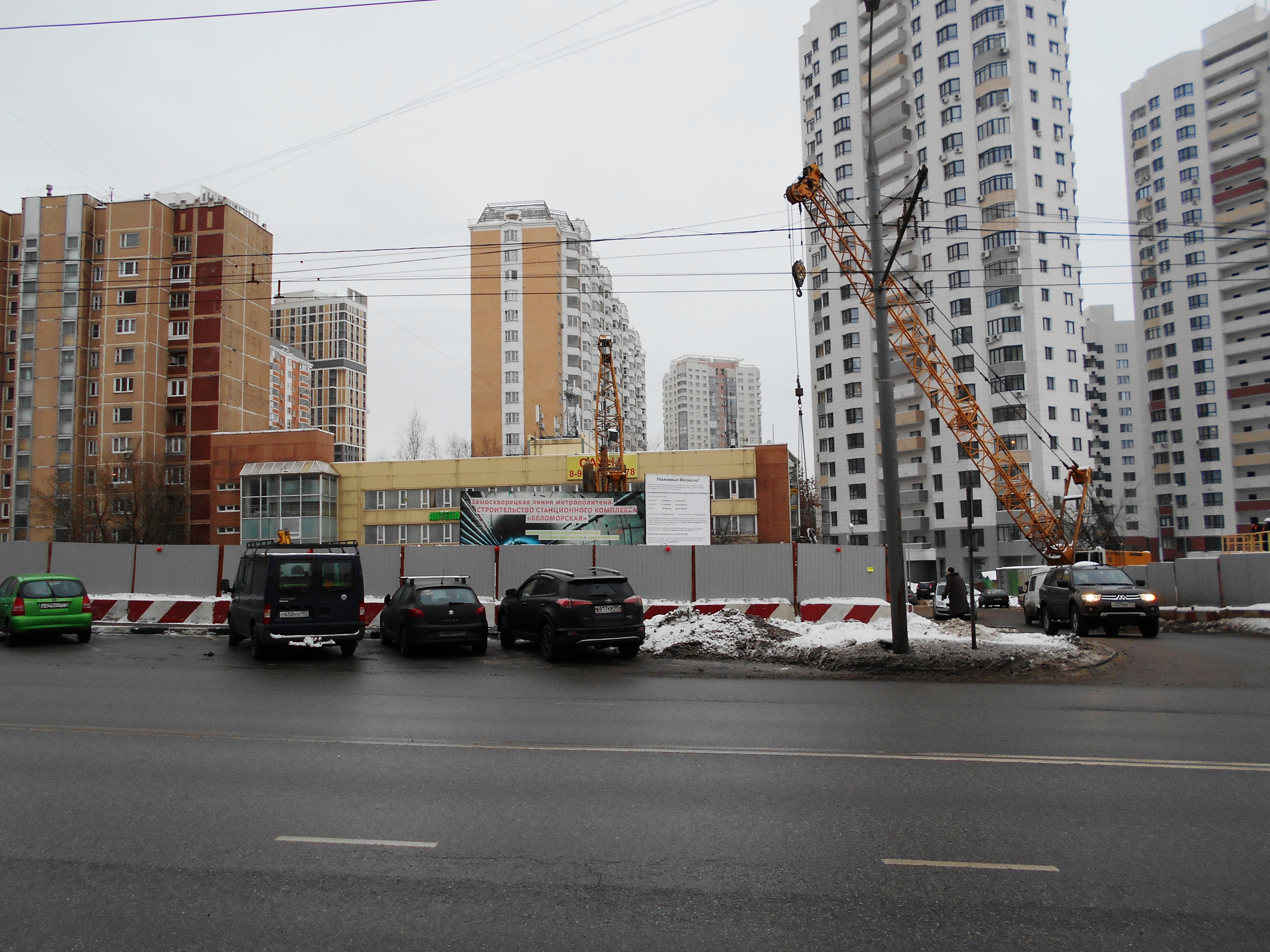
Station under construction in January 2017

It was not until 2011 that the Mayor of Moscow, Sergey Sobyanin, announced that the extension would go ahead for 2014 to 2017. The municipal authorities believed that adding Belomorskaya station could solve transport problems in outlying areas of the northern part of Moscow. Initial plans projected that the station would open in 2016.

In 2014, the Deputy Mayor for Urban Development and Construction, Marat Khusnullin, terminated plans for Belomorskaya, citing inconvenience for local residents. In addition, with the distance from Rechnoy Vokzal at only two kilometers, he determined that the Metro would remain within walking distance for residents. After the decision by Khusnullin, local residents submitted a petition to the authorities to continue with construction of the station. The city met with the residents who asked for construction to continue and ultimately reversed its decision.
