= Baltiyskaya (Moscow Central Circle) =

Station on the Moscow Central Circle

Baltiyskaya Балтийская
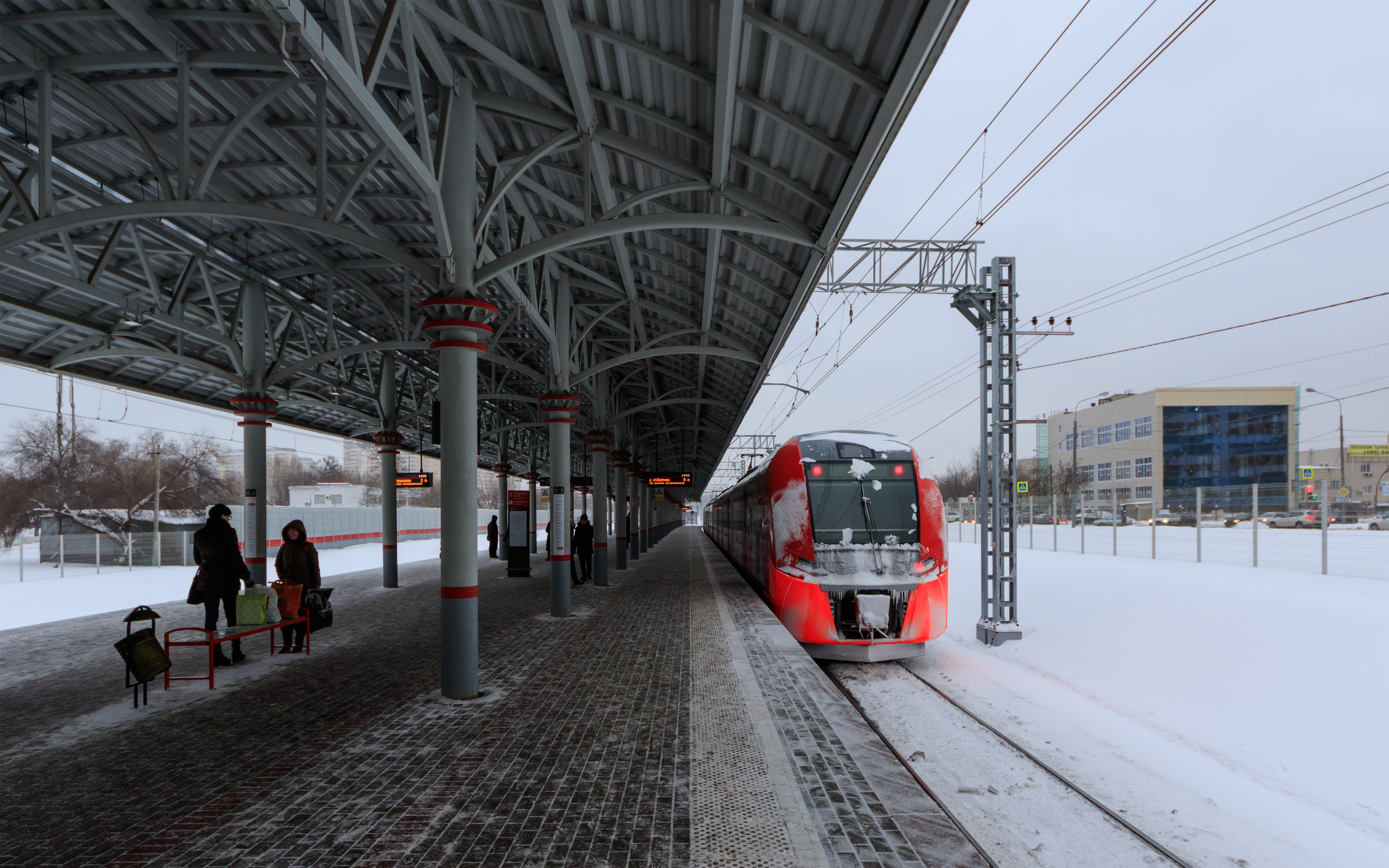

General information
- Coordinates: 55.8259°N 37.4965°E
- System: Moscow Metro
- Line: Moscow Central Circle
- Platforms: 1 island platform
- Tracks: 2

History
- Opened: 10 September 2016; 9 years ago

Services
Preceding station	Moscow Metro	Following station
Streshnevo anticlockwise / outer	Moscow Central Circle	Koptevo clockwise / inner
Out-of-station interchange
Vodny Stadion towards Khovrino	Zamoskvoretskaya line transfer at Voykovskaya	Sokol towards Alma-Atinskaya
Route map
Location
- Location within Moscow Metro

Baltiyskaya (Russian: Балтийская) is a station on the Moscow Central Circle of the Moscow Metro that opened in September 2016. Passengers may make out-of-station transfers to Voykovskaya on the Zamoskvoretskaya Line.

== Name ==
Originally the working name was Glebovo after a local park in the area; however, a proposal to rename the station Voykovskaya for the nearby Metro station generated controversy and opposition, in particular from the Russian Orthodox Church. Voikovskaya station is named for Pyotr Voykov, a Soviet revolutionary who was involved in the murder of the Tsar's family in 1917.

The controversy over the name led to an effort to rename the Voykovskaya Metro station that was ultimately unsuccessful after a public survey. Despite this, the concern over naming a new station after Voykov remained. Moscow Mayor Sergei Sobyanin indicated in 2016 that the decision on the station was still an open question and that the issue would be put to citizens via a separate survey.

A survey conducted by the city in July 2016 only showed support for the name Voykovskaya at 19% out of over 173,000 responses. This led to a decision to include Baltiyskaya as one of 15 name changes prior to the opening of the line in September.
