= Vodny Stadion (Moscow Metro) =

Moscow Metro station

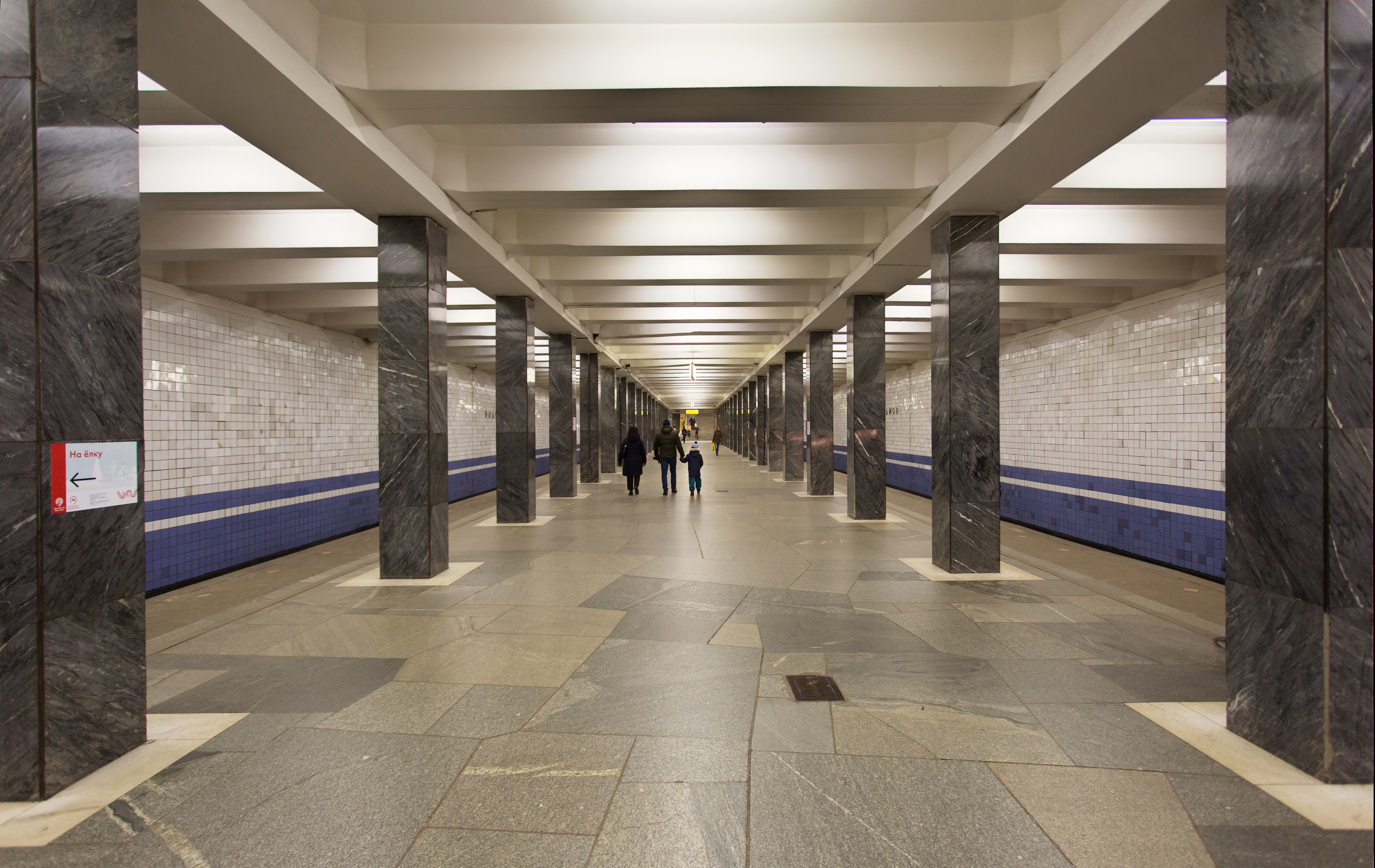

General information
- Location: Golovinsky District; Voykovsky District; Northern Administrative Okrug; Moscow; Russia
- Coordinates: 55.8398°N 37.4867°E
- System: Moscow Metro station
- Owner: Moskovsky Metropoliten
- Line: Zamoskvoretskaya line
- Platforms: 1 island platform
- Tracks: 2
- Connections: Bus: 65, 70, 72, 123, 440, 698

Construction
- Depth: 6 metres (20 ft)
- Platform levels: 1
- Parking: No

Other information
- Station code: 040

History
- Opened: 31 December 1964; 61 years ago

Passengers
- 2002: 24,747,000

Services
Preceding station	Moscow Metro	Following station
Rechnoy Vokzal towards Khovrino	Zamoskvoretskaya line	Voykovskaya towards Alma-Atinskaya
Route map
Location
- Location within Moscow Metro

Vodny Stadion (Russian: Во́дный стадио́н, Water Stadium) is a Moscow Metro station on the Zamoskvoretskaya Line. It was built in 1964 according to the standard pillar-trispan design. The pillars are clad in bluish marble and the walls are tiled in white with two stripes of blue at the base. The two entrances to the station are located near the intersection of Kronshtadtsky Boulevard and the Golovinskoye highway. The architects for this station were N. Demchinsky, Yu. Kolesnikova, and M. Markovsky.

The stadium is currently mostly abandoned.

== Name ==
The station is named for the Dinamo Water Stadium at the nearby Khimki Reservoir (Moskva River).

== Gallery ==
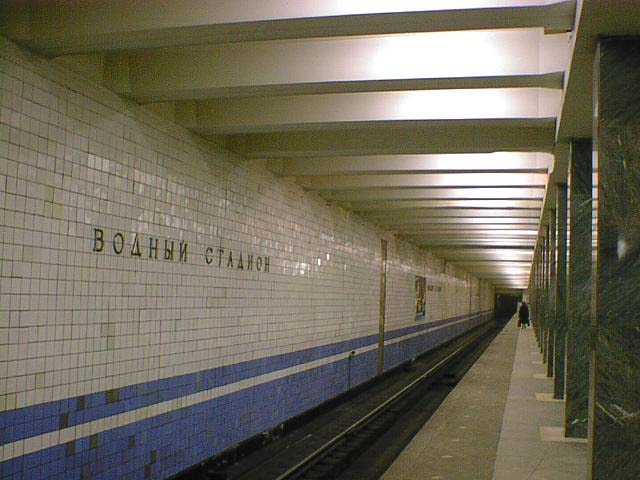
Platform
