= South River Terminal =

River terminal in Moscow, Russia

Coordinates: 55°41′20″N 37°40′24″E

- Южный речной вокзал
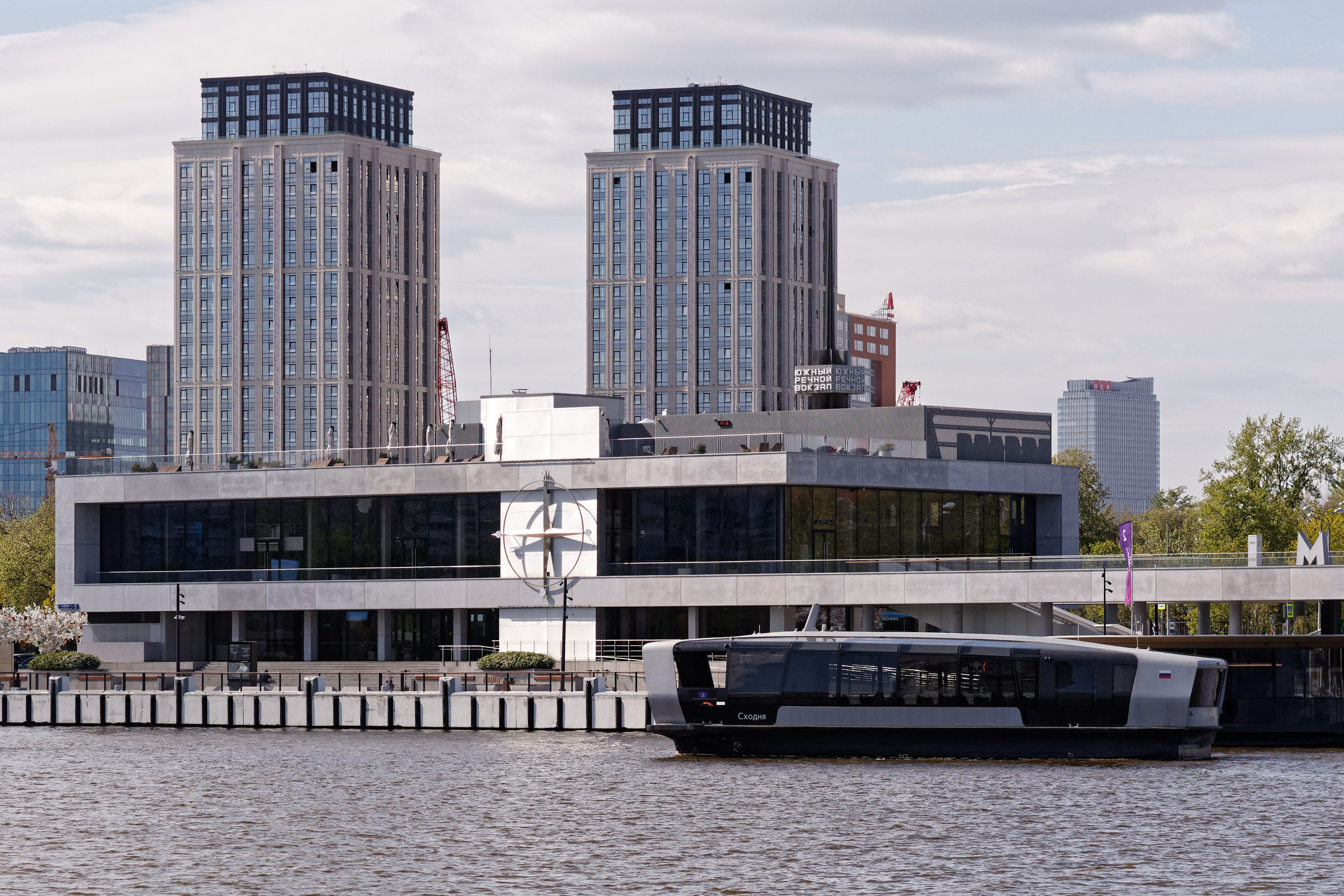
- Interactive map of the South River Terminal area

General information
- Architectural style: Pre-renovation: Soviet architectural modernism Post-renovation: Neomodern
- Location: Nagatinsky Zaton District, Moscow, Russia
- Groundbreaking: 1985
- Opened: 1986
- Renovated: 2023

Other information
- Public transit access: Tekhnopark; Moscow Regular River Transport

The South River Terminal (Russian: Южный речной вокзал) is one of two river transport passenger terminals in Nagatinsky Zaton District, Moscow. Together with the North River Terminal, it serves as both a hub for long range services, as well as contains connections to the Moscow Regular River Transport network. It is also linked to the Moscow Metro via the nearby Tekhnopark Station.

The present terminal was opened in 1986. From 2021 the building was completely reconstructed, opening once more in 2023 with significant architectural changes.

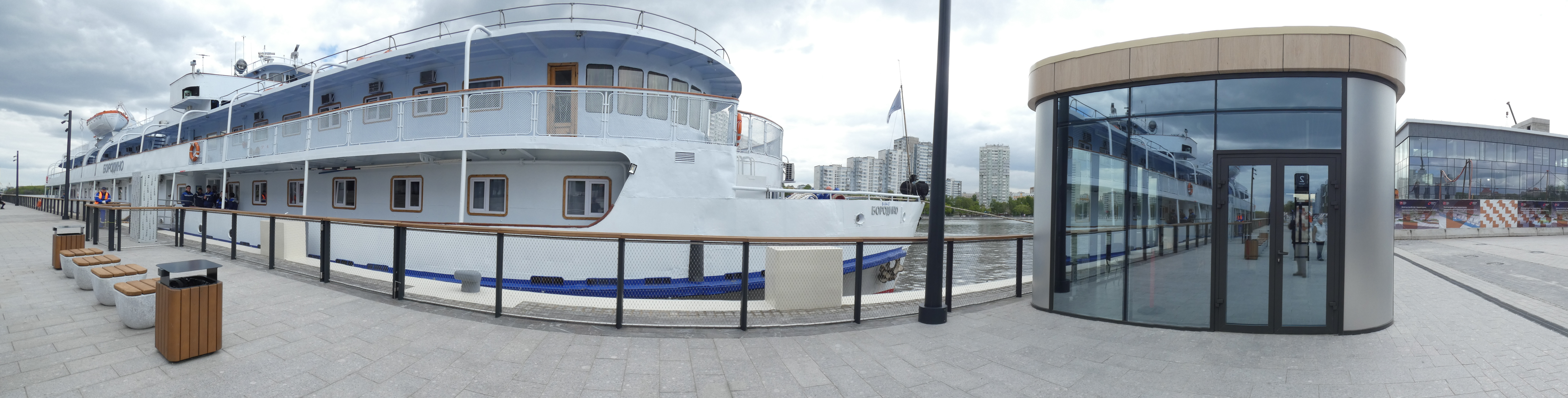
The first river cruise after terminal building repair arrived at the Southern River Station

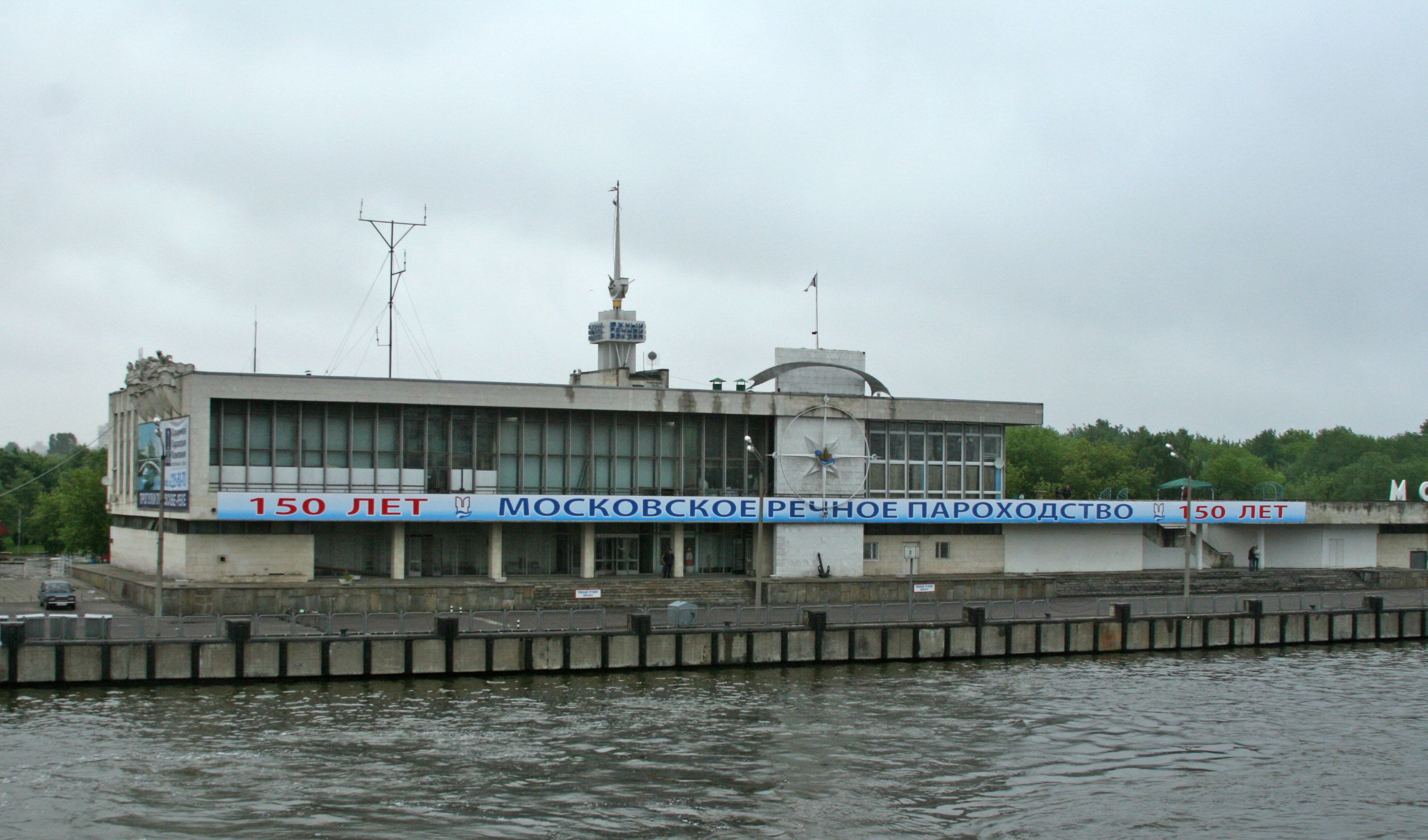
South river terminal (old view)

== See also ==
- Moscow Canal
- Moskva River
- North River Terminal
