= North River Terminal =

Coordinates: 55°51′03.93″N 37°28′00.94″E

North river terminal
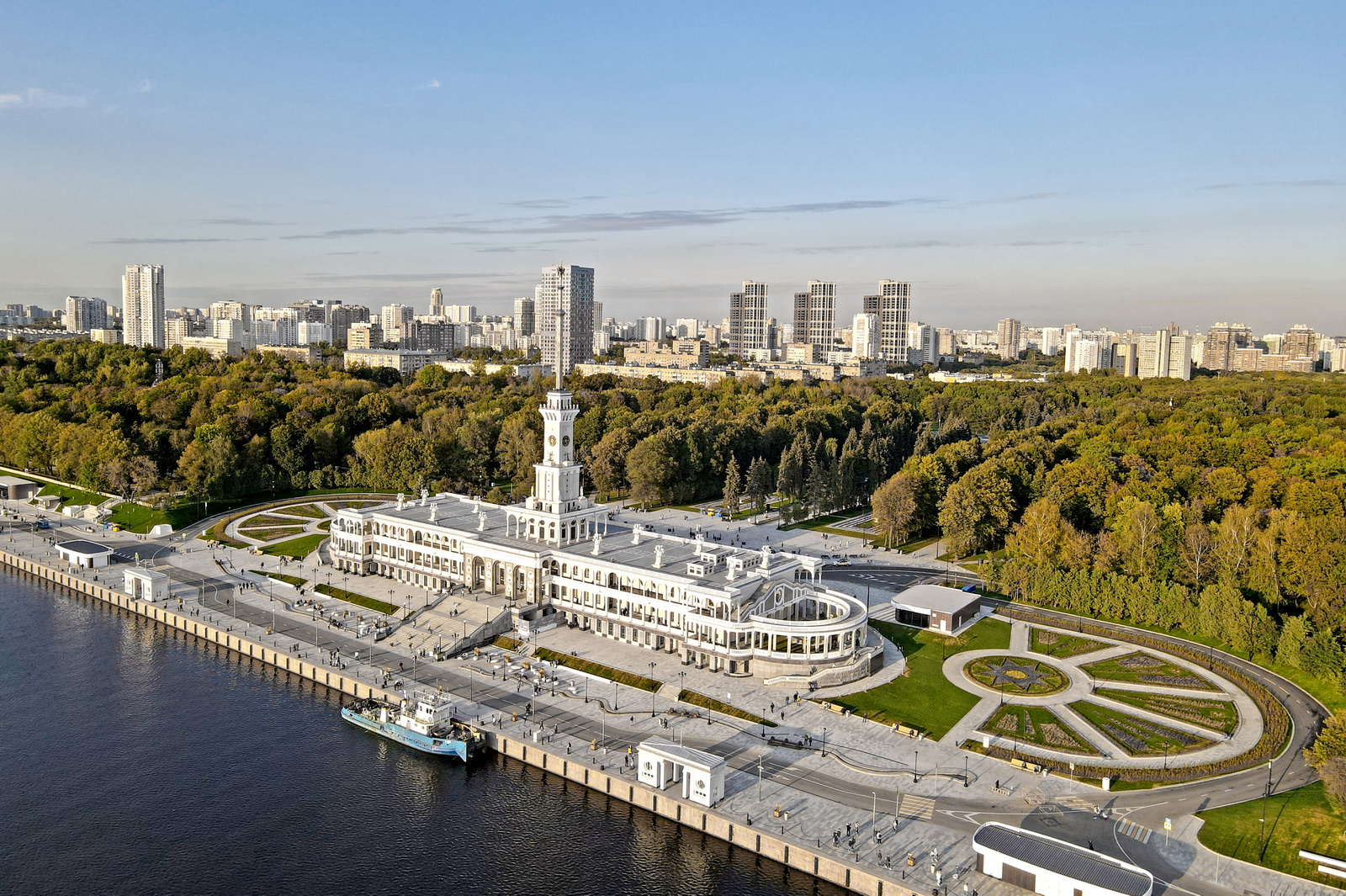
- Interactive map of the North river terminal area

General information
- Architectural style: Stalinist architecture
- Location: 51, Leningradskoye Highway, Moscow, Russia
- Opened: 1937

Height
- Height: 75 m

Design and construction
- Architects: Alexei Rukhlyadev, Vladimir Krinsky

Other information
- Public transit access: Rechnoy Vokzal

The North River Terminal or Rechnoy Vokzal (Russian: Речной вокзал, meaning "River Station"), is one of two passenger terminals of river transport in Moscow. It is also the main hub for long-range and intercity routes. The terminal was built in 1937. The facility was renovated and upgraded from 2018 to 2020.

== See also ==
- Moscow Canal
- Moskva River
- South River Terminal
