= Voykovsky District =

Voykovsky District Войковский район (Russian)
- District
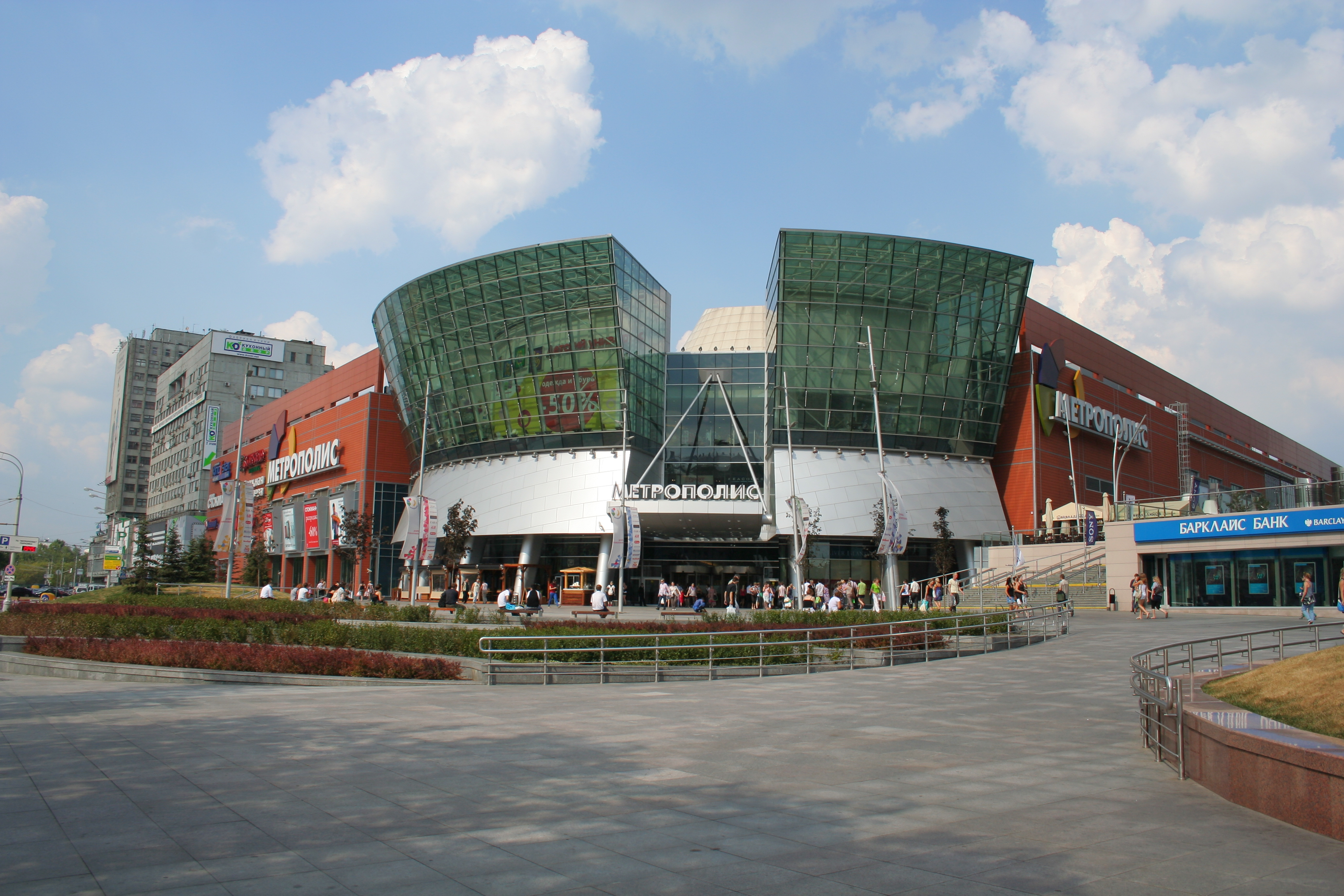
- A shopping center in Voykovsky District

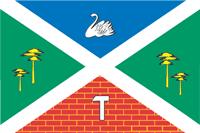
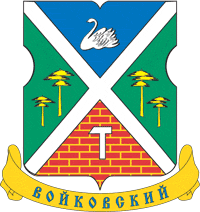
- Flag Coat of arms
- Location of Voykovsky District in Moscow (pre-2012 map)
- Coordinates: 55°49′40″N 37°30′00″E
- Country: Russia
- Federal subject: federal city of Moscow

Area
  - Total: 6.6 km^{2} (2.5 sq mi)

Population (2010 Census)
  - Total: 64,933
  - Density: 9,800/km^{2} (25,000/sq mi)

Municipal structure
  - Municipally incorporated as: Voykovsky Municipal Okrug
- Time zone: UTC+
- OKTMO ID: 45336000
- Website: http://voykovsky.mos.ru

Population of Voykovsky District
- 2010 Census: 64,933
- 2002 Census: 67,470

Voykovsky District (Russian: Во́йковский райо́н) is an administrative district (raion), one of the sixteen in Northern Administrative Okrug of the federal city of Moscow, Russia. It is located 10 km northwest of the Moscow city center. The area of the district is 6.6 square kilometres (2.5 mi^{2}) As of the 2010 Census, the total population of the district was 64,933.

== Municipal status ==
As a municipal division, it is incorporated as Voykovsky Municipal Okrug.

== History ==
The territory of the present area "Voikovsky" was inhabited by people in ancient times, as evidenced by archaeological excavations in 1932-34. However, multi-storey construction began only under Soviet rule. The main highway of the district is the Leningrad Highway which has a long history. The former Petrograd Highway in 1924 became Leningrad and is the main thoroughfare on the way to St. Petersburg. In the 15th-17th centuries through the village of Nakhinskoe, later Nikolskoe, there was a large trade road to Tver, along it there were trade people, numerous convoys with goods, drove cattle. In the 18th century, when Peter I moved the capital to St. Petersburg, the road connected the two largest cities of Russia.

The metro station "Voykovskaya" got its name from the settlement Voikovets located in this part of Moscow at the plant named after. Behind the second lobby of the "Voykovskaya" metro station in 1970, the "Warsaw" cinema was built with a large concert hall for 1200 seats, which at the moment does not work, and the room is rented to a restaurant.

The present appearance of the Voykovsky district began to form in the 1930s, when together with the Khimki Reservoir, the first multi-storey residential buildings, appeared on its territory. After 1945, mass housing and industrial construction began, new neighborhoods appeared (for example, the micro district "Lebed" that was famous in the 1970s). Now the reconstruction of a dilapidated housing stock and vast territories of industrial enterprises is in full swing in the region, objects of social and cultural life are being built. On the territory of the district there will be a section of the Fourth Ring Road (Moscow) with a network of large interchanges and flyovers, as well as a high-speed track for the Leningrad highway.
