= Khovrino (Moscow Metro) =

Moscow Metro station

Khovrino Ховрино
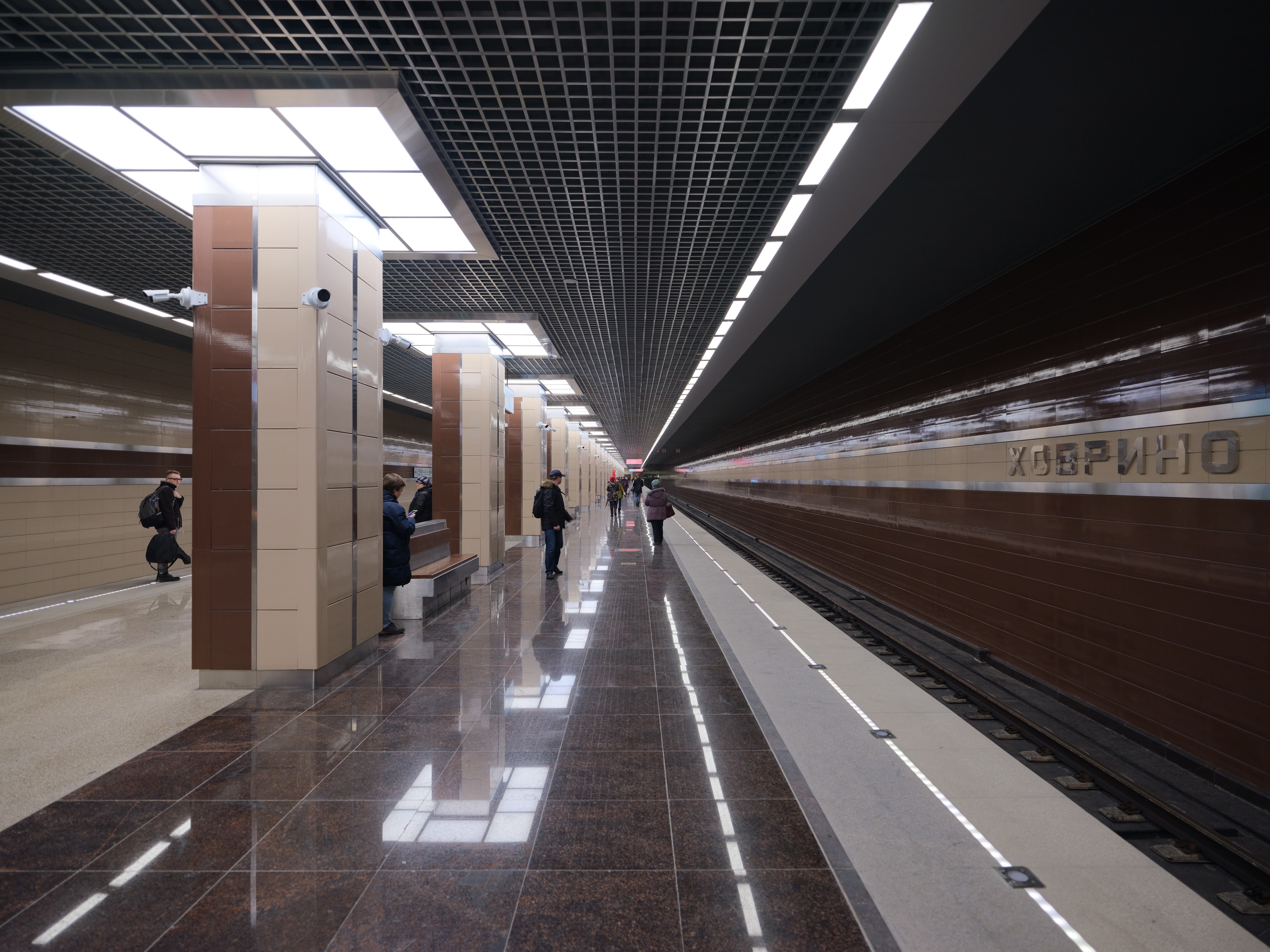
- The Khovrino metro station on its opening day.

General information
- Location: Khovrino District, Northern Administrative Okrug; Moscow; Russia
- Coordinates: 55.879167°N 37.482222°E
- System: Moscow Metro station
- Owner: Moskovsky Metropoliten
- Line: Zamoskvoretskaya line
- Platforms: 1 island platform
- Tracks: 2

Construction
- Structure type: Two-span shallow-column station
- Depth: 12 metres (39 ft)
- Platform levels: 1

History
- Opened: 31 December 2017

Services
Preceding station	Moscow Metro	Following station
Terminus	Zamoskvoretskaya line	Belomorskaya towards Alma-Atinskaya
Route map
Location
- Location within Moscow Metro

Khovrino (Russian: Ховрино) is a station on the Zamoskvoretskaya line of the Moscow Metro. The station opened on 31 December 2017. It is the northern terminus of the line, and the closest subway station to the Sheremetyevo International Airport.

== Name ==
The working name of the station was originally Ulitsa Dybenko for the street on which the station is situated. In 2013, the city changed the official name to Khovrino, to reflect the name of the municipal district, Khovrino Municipal Okrug.

== History ==
Various plans have existed throughout the history of the line to extend it northward. The boring of 2.2 km (1.4 mi) of tunnels north from the former terminus, Rechnoy Vokzal, was completed in December 2014 by tunnel boring machine. The station was originally planned to open in December 2016, but, despite construction being largely completed in 2016, the opening of Khovrino was postponed a year because of the decision to construct an intermediate station Belomorskaya. In July 2019 Bellingcat researcher Aric Toler reported that the station received an online bomb threat that was posted on Twitter.

== Gallery ==
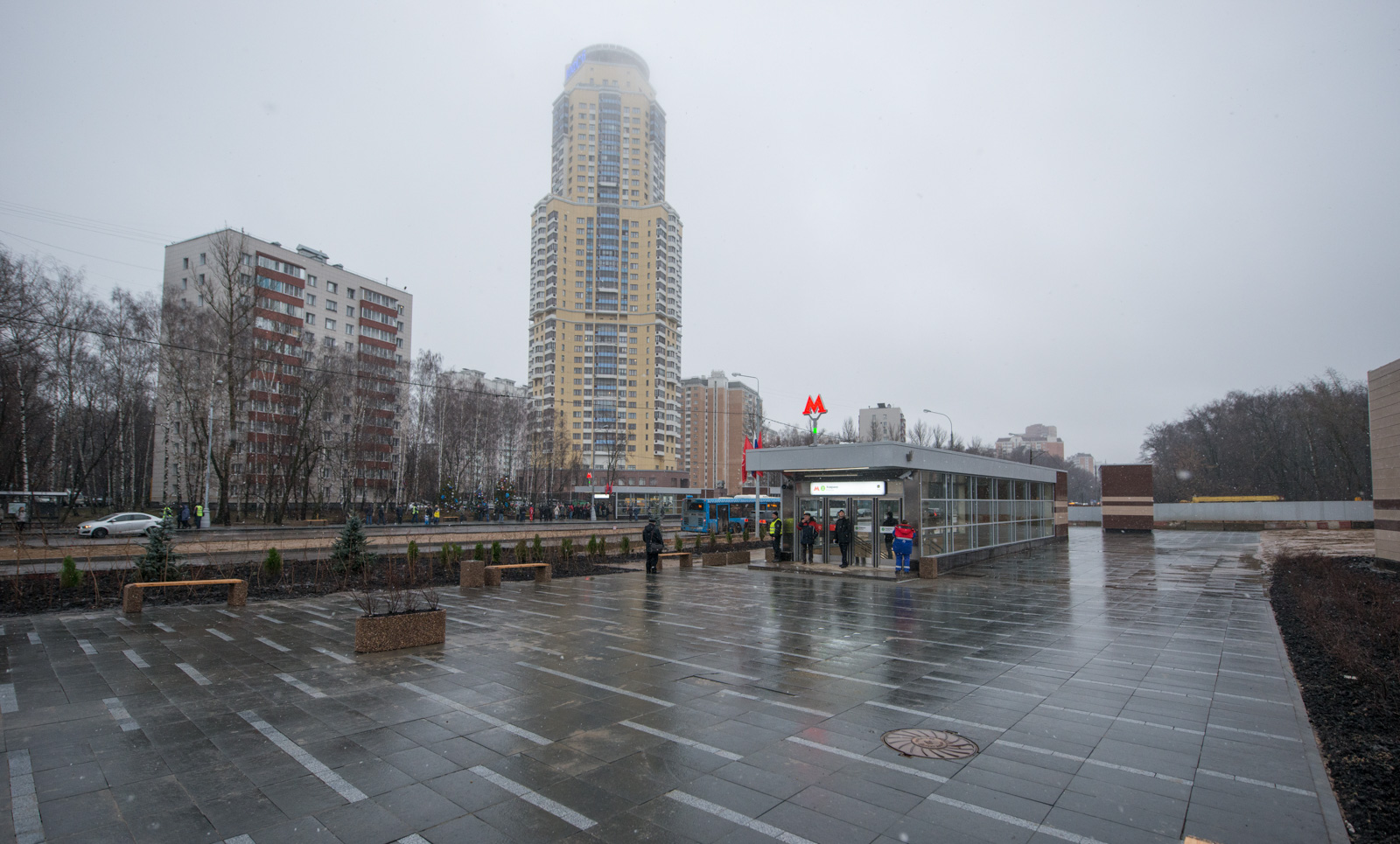
Entrance vestibule

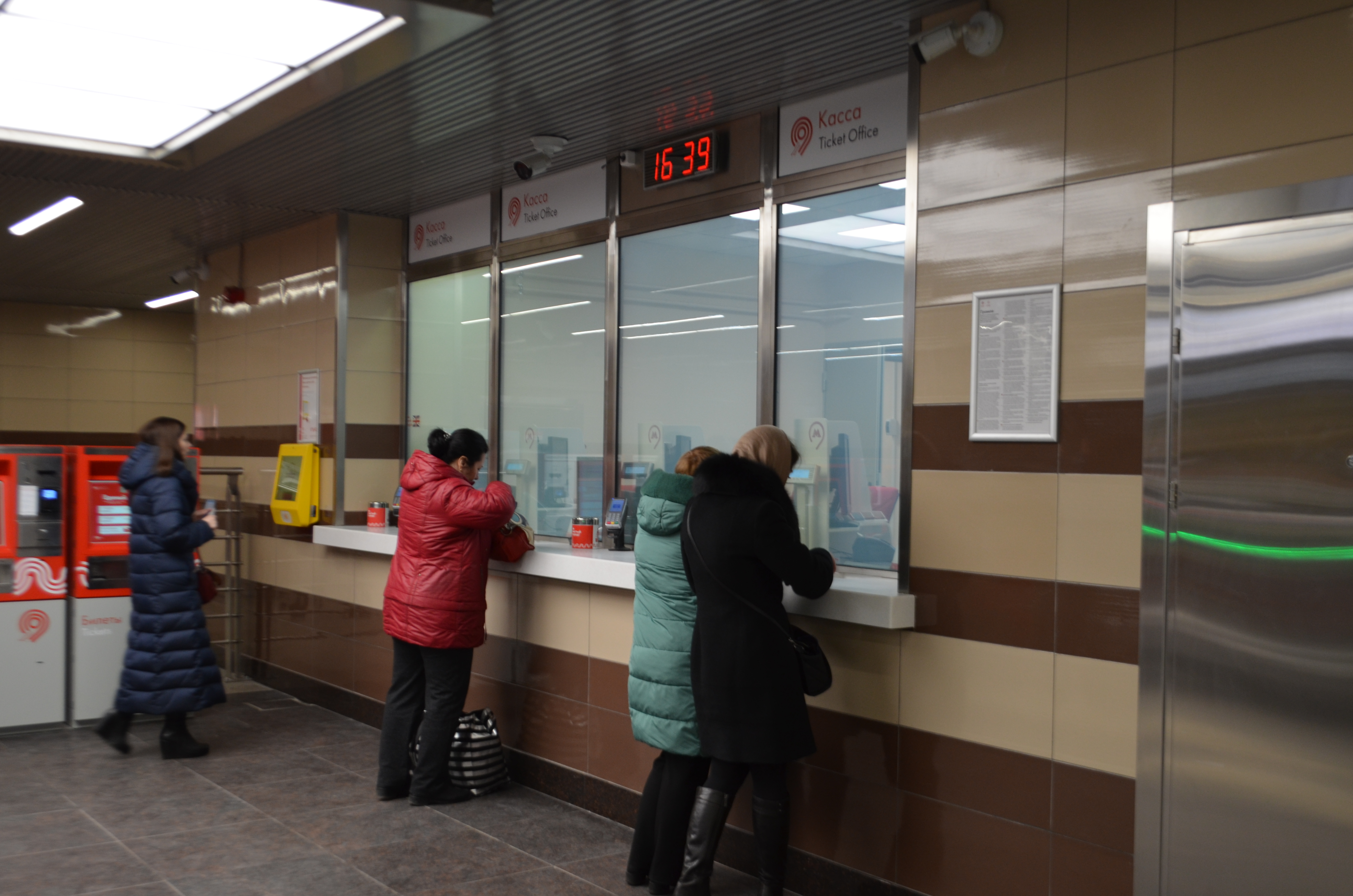
Ticket office

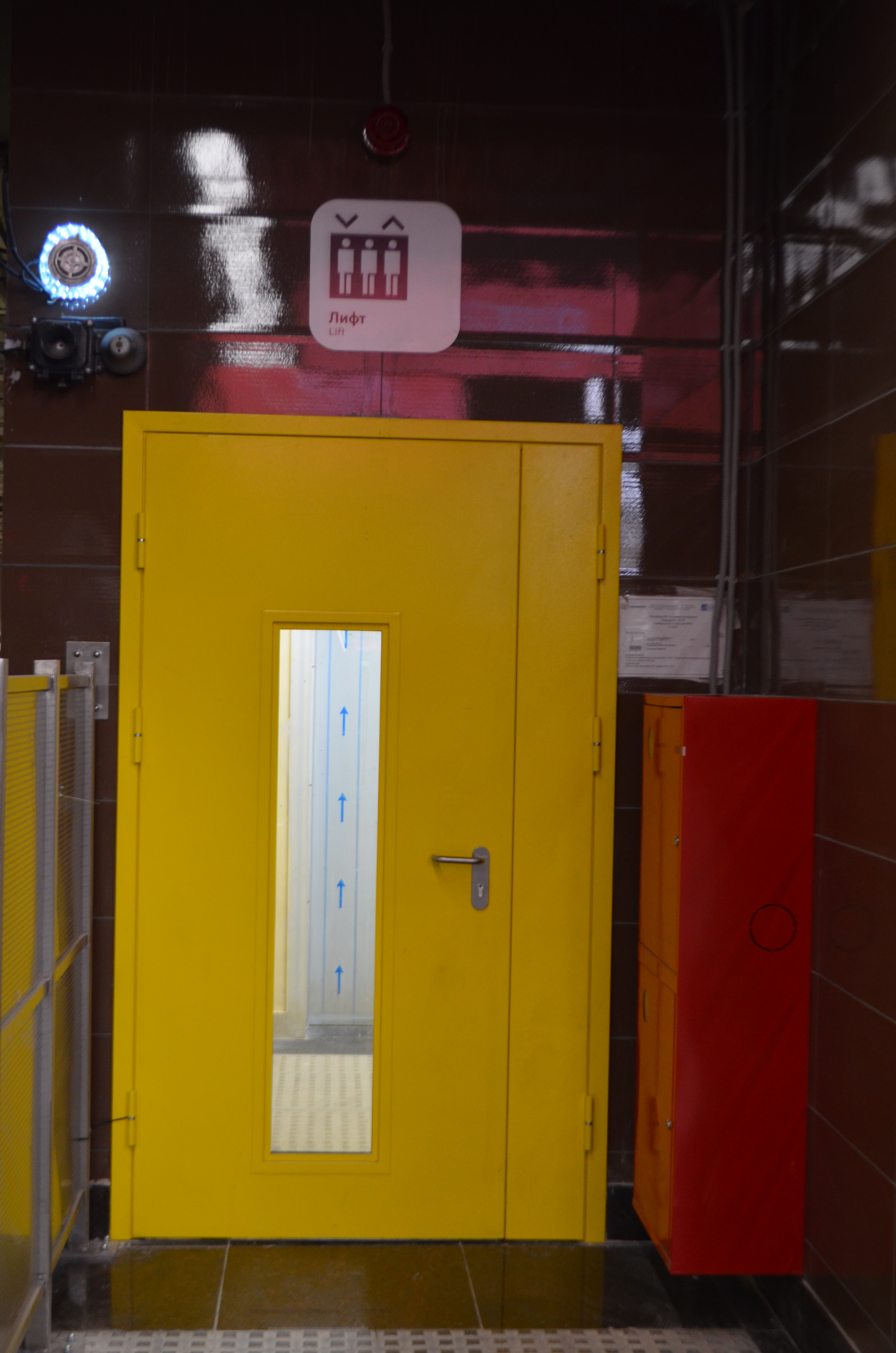
Lift on the station
