= Rechnoy Vokzal (Moscow Metro) =

Moscow Metro station

Rechnoy Vokzal Речной вокзал
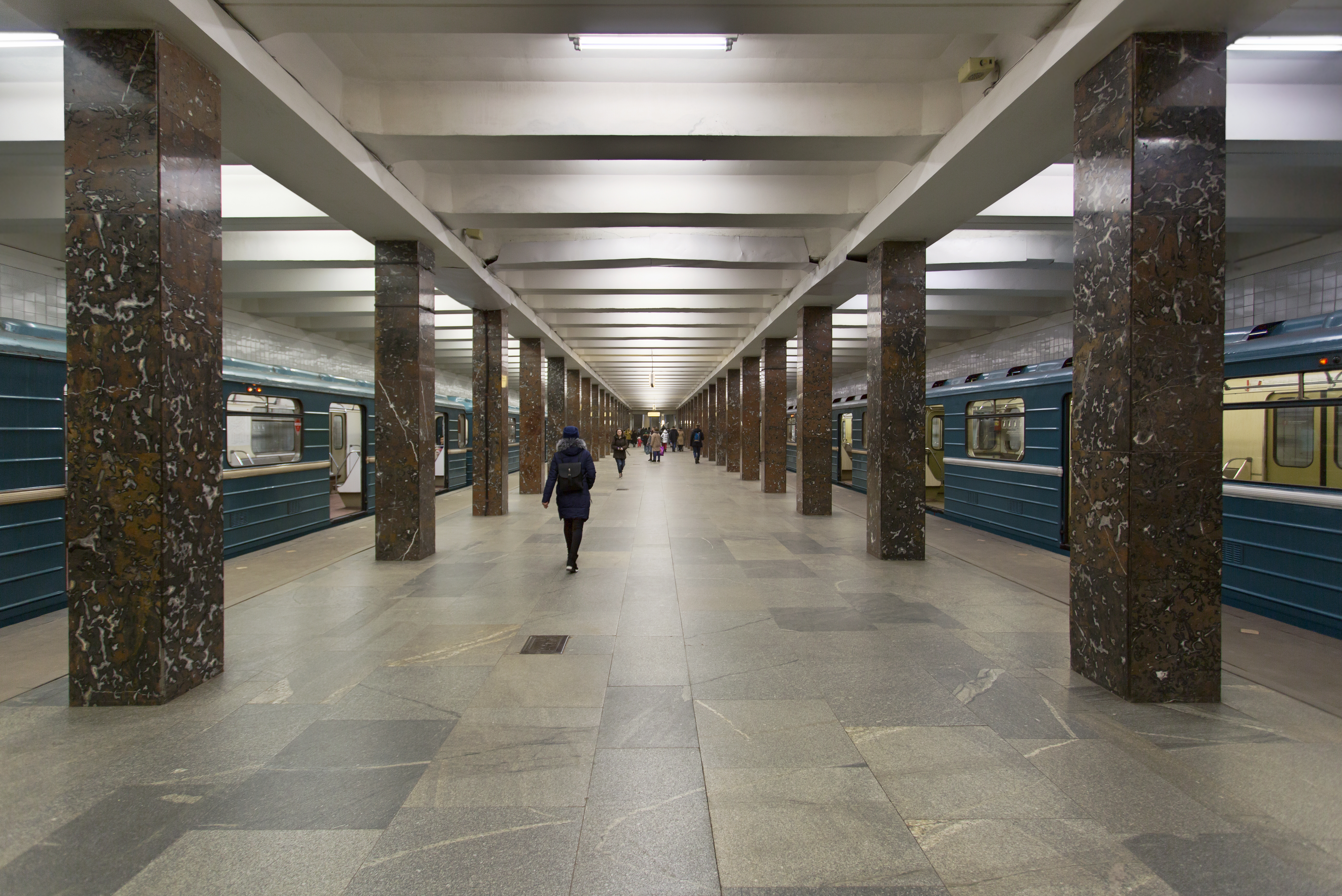

General information
- Location: Levoberezhny District; Northern Administrative Okrug; Moscow; Russia
- Coordinates: 55.8549°N 37.4761°E
- System: Moscow Metro station
- Owner: Moskovsky Metropoliten
- Line: Zamoskvoretskaya line
- Platforms: 1 island platform
- Tracks: 2
- Connections: Bus: 90, 138, 173, 188, 199, 200, 233, 270, 400, 673, 739, 745, 801, 851, 851s Trolleybus: 58

Construction
- Depth: 6 metres (20 ft)
- Platform levels: 1
- Parking: No

Other information
- Station code: 041

History
- Opened: December 31, 1964; 61 years ago

Services
Preceding station	Moscow Metro	Following station
Belomorskaya towards Khovrino	Zamoskvoretskaya line	Vodny Stadion towards Alma-Atinskaya
Route map
Location
- Location within Moscow Metro

Rechnoy Vokzal (Russian: Речной вокзал, River Terminal) is a station on the Zamoskvoretskaya line of the Moscow Metro. It was opened on the New Year's Eve of 1965 and, until 2017, was the northern terminus of the line. It is named after the North River Terminal located nearby.

The design follows the standardized pillar-trispan design featuring white-flecked, brown marble pillars and tiled walls. The architects were N. Demchinsky and Yu. Kolesnikova. It has two identical vestibules, located at the intersection of Festivalnaya Street and the M10 highway.

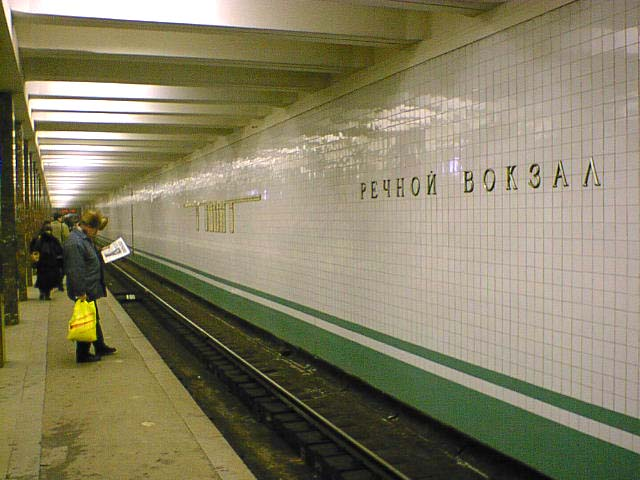
Platform

Being one of the two closest subway stations to the Sheremetyevo International Airport (along with Planernaya, on the Tagansko-Krasnopresnenskaya line), Rechnoy Vokzal is connected to the airport by frequent bus and passenger van service. The bus and van terminal may move to Khovrino once the transport hub is completed there.

Until 1975, it was the northernmost station on the metro system and, until 2017, was the terminus of the line. Both Khovrino, which opened in December 2017, and Belomorskaya, which opened in 2018, have been completed, pushing the line further north.
