= Kolomenskaya (Moscow Metro) =

Metro station in Russia

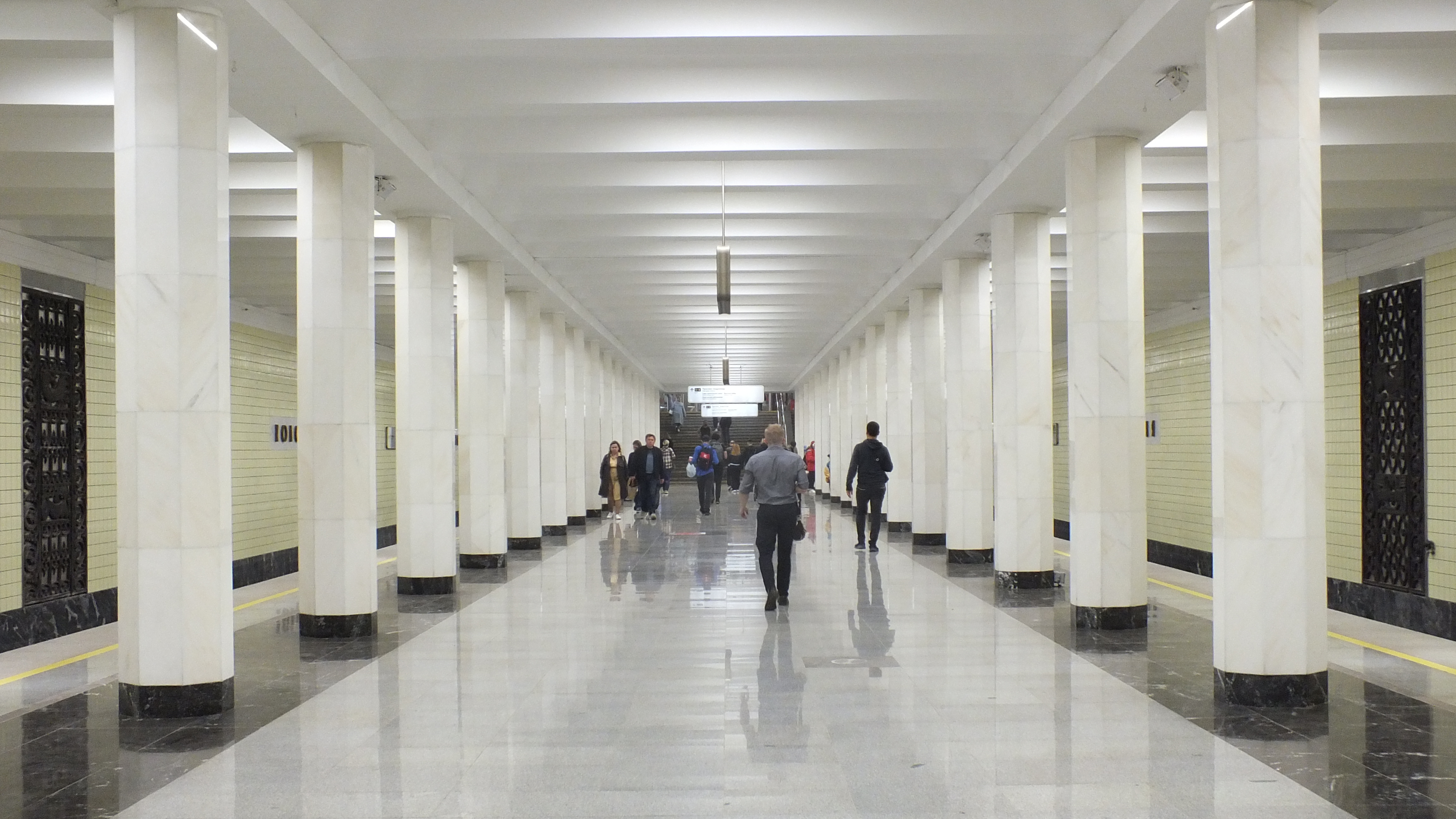

General information
- Location: Nagatino-Sadovniki District; Nagatinsky Zaton District; Southern Administrative Okrug; Moscow; Russia
- Coordinates: 55.6785°N 37.6638°E
- System: Moscow Metro station
- Owner: Moskovsky Metropoliten
- Line: Zamoskvoretskaya line
- Platforms: 1 island platform
- Tracks: 2
- Connections: Bus: м19, е80, с811, с820, 824, с856, 888, 888к, 899, с951. Night routes: н13; Tram: 47, 49.

Construction
- Depth: 9 metres (30 ft)
- Platform levels: 1
- Parking: No

Other information
- Station code: 028

History
- Opened: 11 August 1969; 57 years ago

Services
Preceding station	Moscow Metro	Following station
Tekhnopark towards Khovrino	Zamoskvoretskaya line	Kashirskaya towards Alma-Atinskaya
Route map
Location
- Location within Moscow Metro

Kolomenskaya (Russian: Коло́менская) is an underground metro station on the Zamoskvoretskaya Line of the Moscow Metro in Moscow, Russia. It was named after the nearby Kolomenskoye museum-park. The station is situated at the intersection of Andropov avenue, Nagatinskaya and Sudostroitelnaya (literally Shipbuilding) streets

== History ==
Kolomenskaya Station was opened on 11 August 1969 as a part of the southern line extension of the Moscow Metro system.

The stations was closed from 12 November 2022 to May 2023 due to the reconstruction works.

== Design ==
Octagonal pillars of the station hall are lined with grey marble and the floor is riveted with red granite in the centre and grey granite at the sides. The track walls are faced with yellow ceramic tiles with a stripe of grey marble at the base. The station is adorned with copper plaques on the theme How Motherland began (sculptor E.Ladygin).

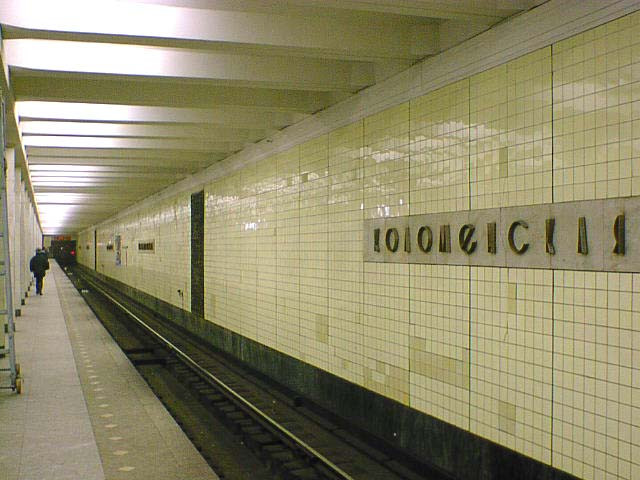
Station platform in 2000

== Exits ==
The station has two underground vestibules, located on the intersection between the Andropova avenue and the Nagatinskaya/Novinki street. Both vestibules are interlinked with underpasses that offer exits to the surface level which covered glazed pavilions.

== Surrounding area ==
The construction of the station is a typical example of Soviet urban development, as the apartment blocks that were built around it are contemporary with the station. The region that it is located in, Nagatino became part of Moscow only a few years prior to the construction of the station. Part of the track from Avtozavodskaya is above ground, and it passes over the Moskva River on the Nagatinsky Metro Bridge which was opened simultaneously with the new segment. Plans for a new station, Tekhnopark (alternative name, Prospekt Andropova) to be added in the future remains unfulfilled.
