= Yuri Luzhkov Park =

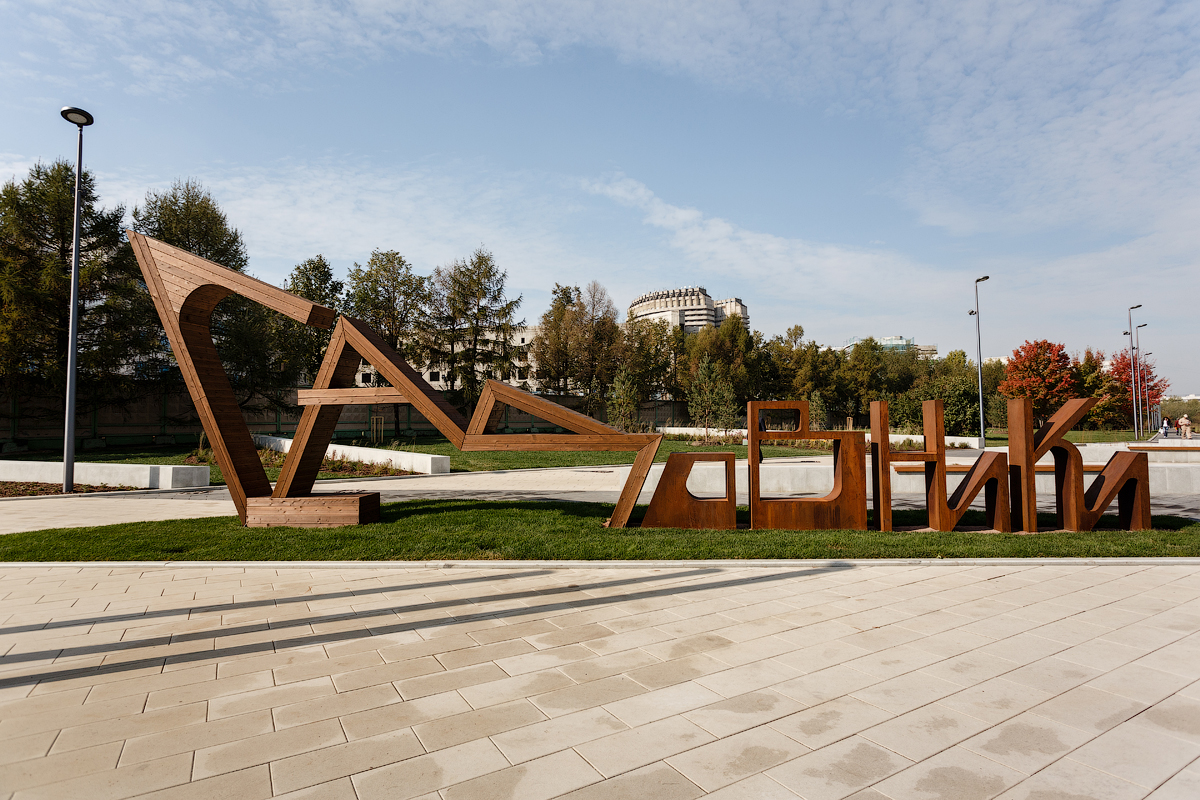
- Park from the direction of Kashirskaya metro station
- Location in Moscow
- Location: Moscow, Russia
- Coordinates: 55°39′43″N 37°39′14″E
- Area: 34.5 ha (85 acres)
- Owner: State autonomous institution of culture Park of Culture and Recreation "Kuzminki"
- Public transit: Kolomenskaya; Kashirskaya

Yuri Luzhkov Park (Russian: Парк имени Ю. М. Лужкова) is located in Nagatino-Sadovniki District (raion), Southern Administrative Okrug of Moscow. It was founded in 1989.

Governing body is State autonomous institution of culture Park of Culture and Recreation "Kuzminki".

September 21, 2021 was renamed in honor of Moscow Mayor Yuri Luzhkov.

== Gallery ==
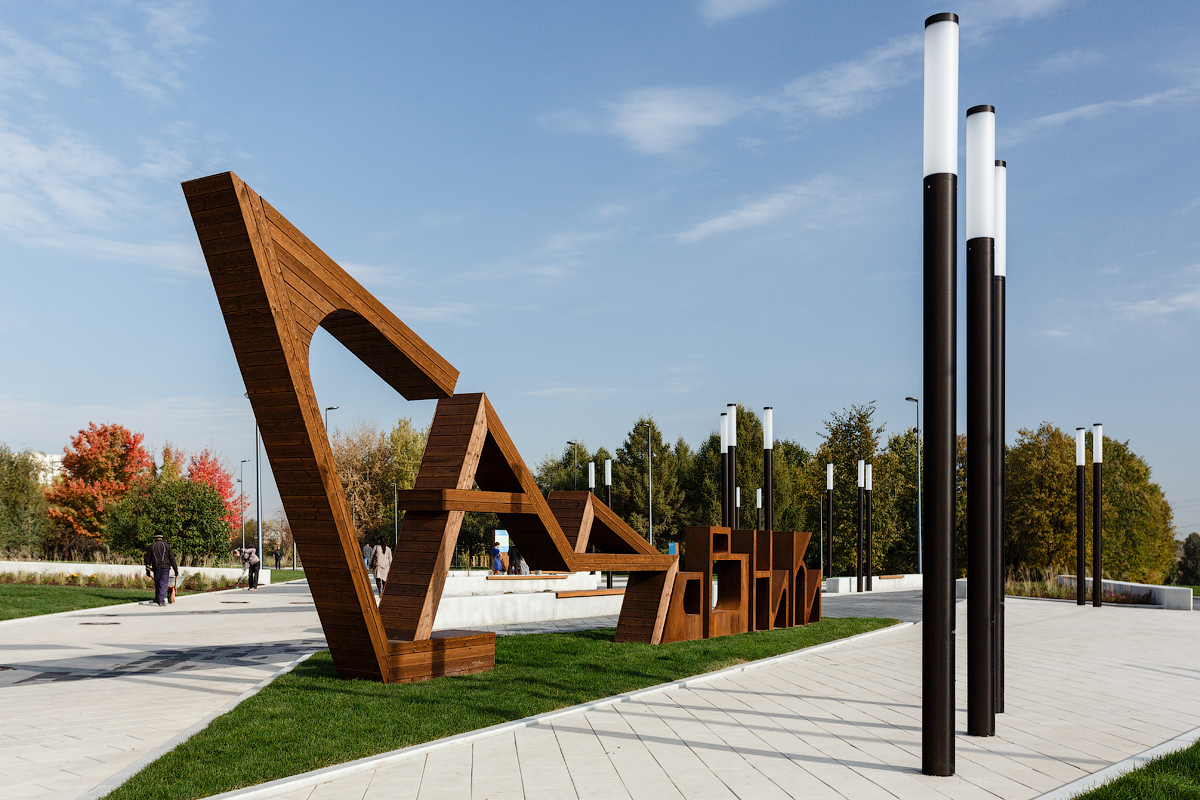

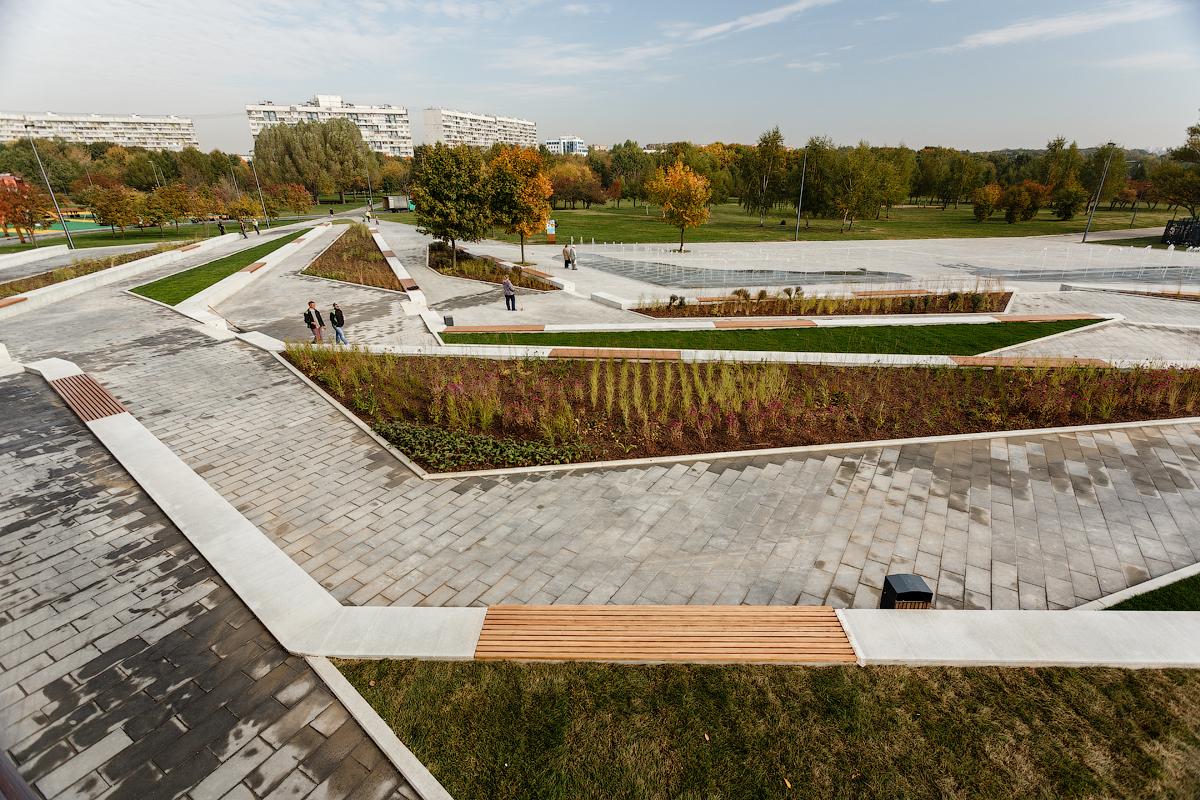

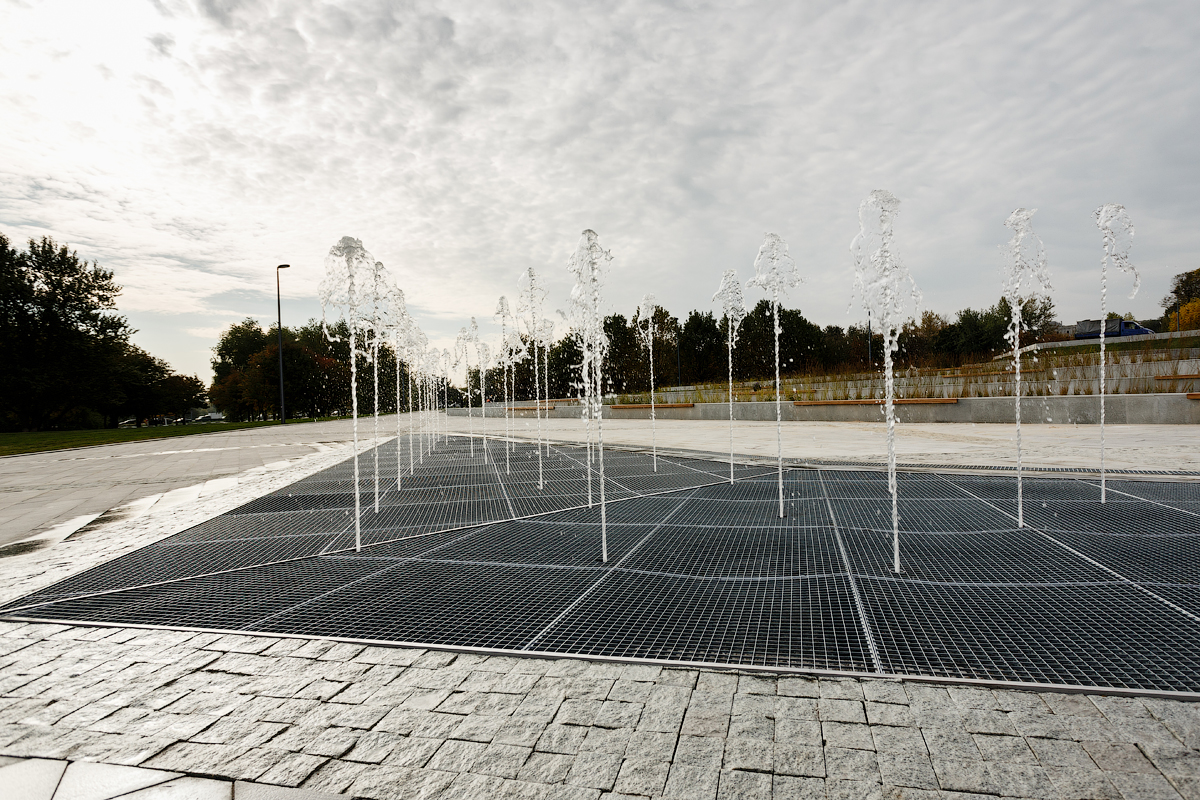

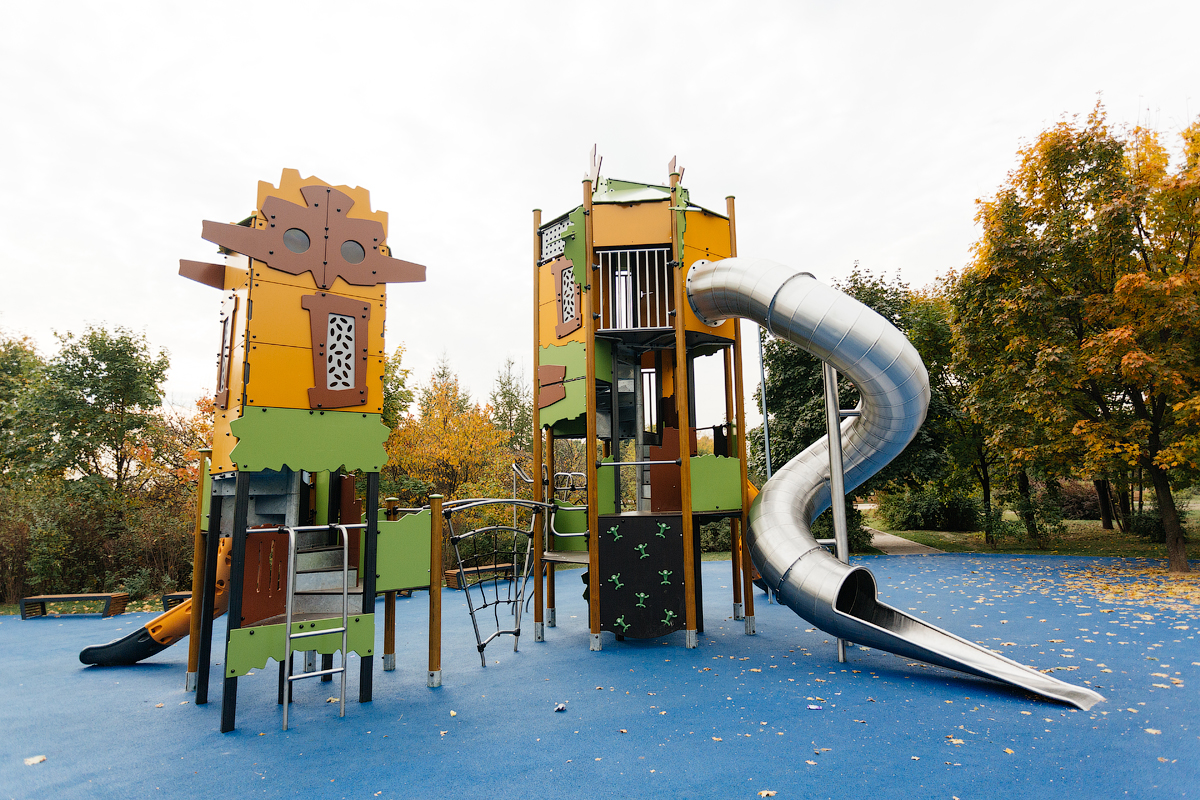

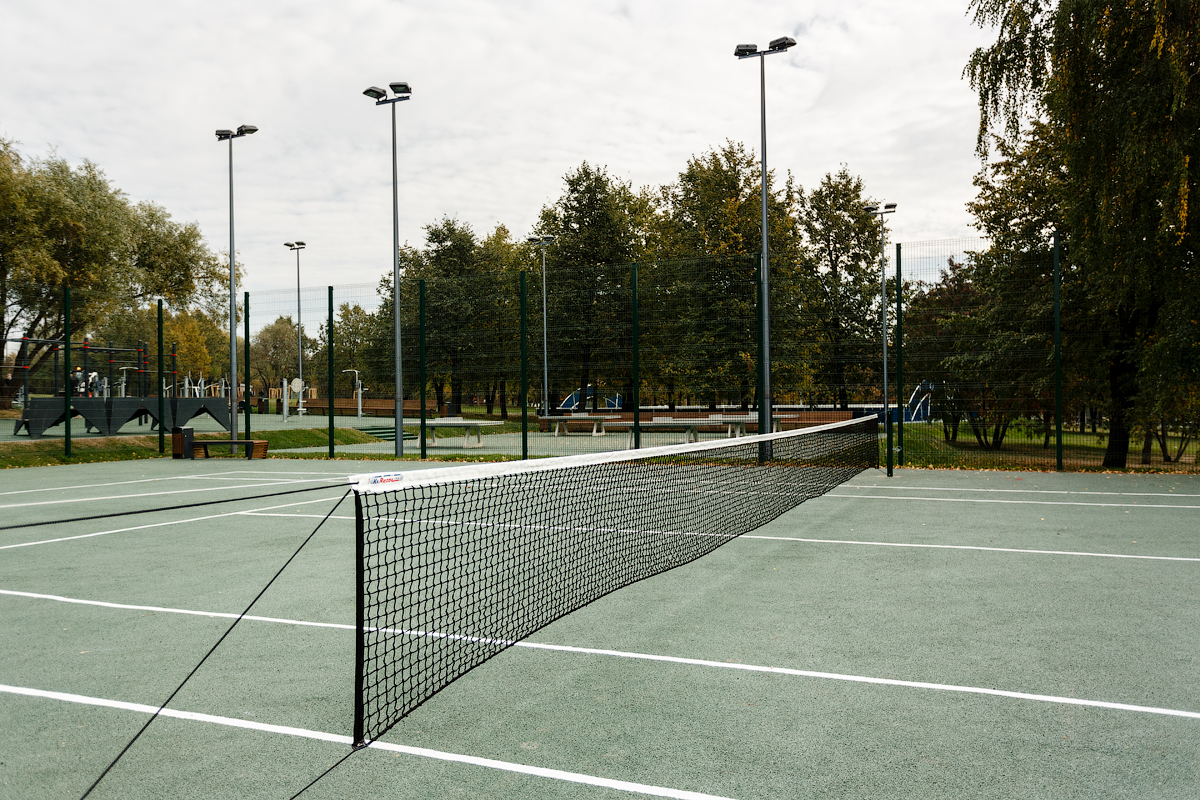

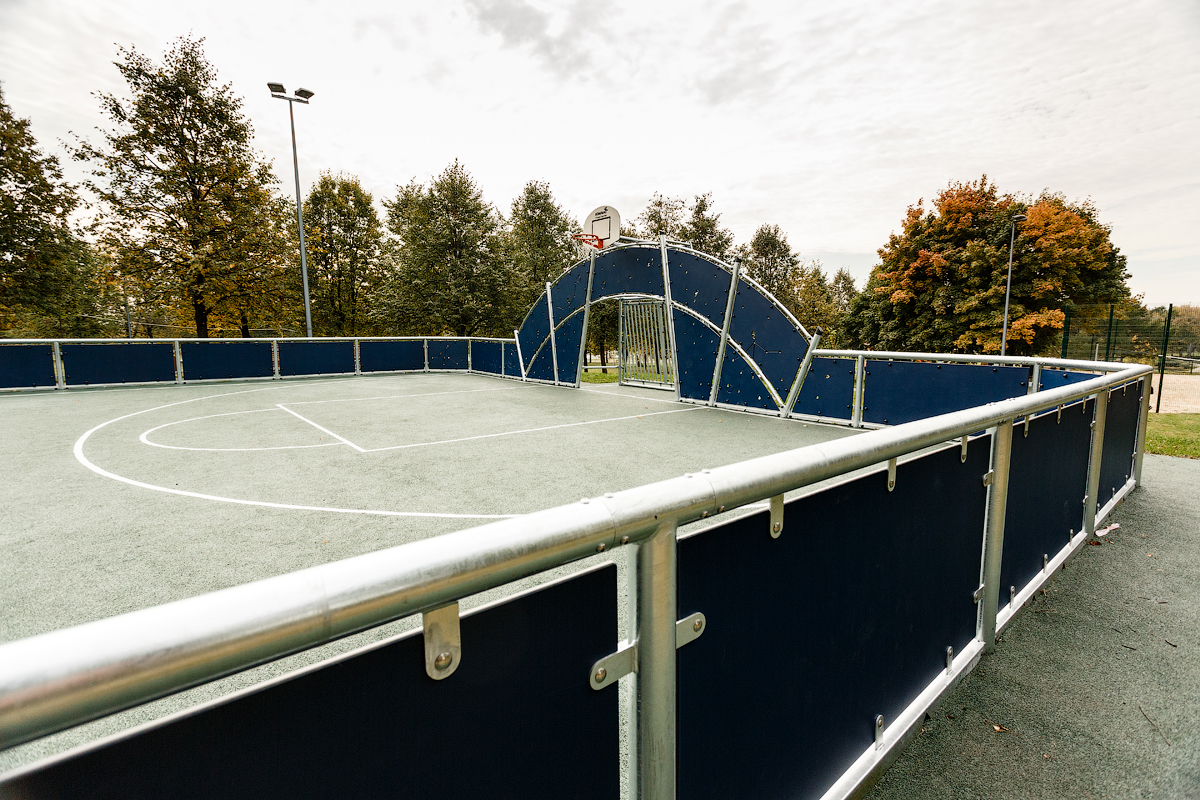

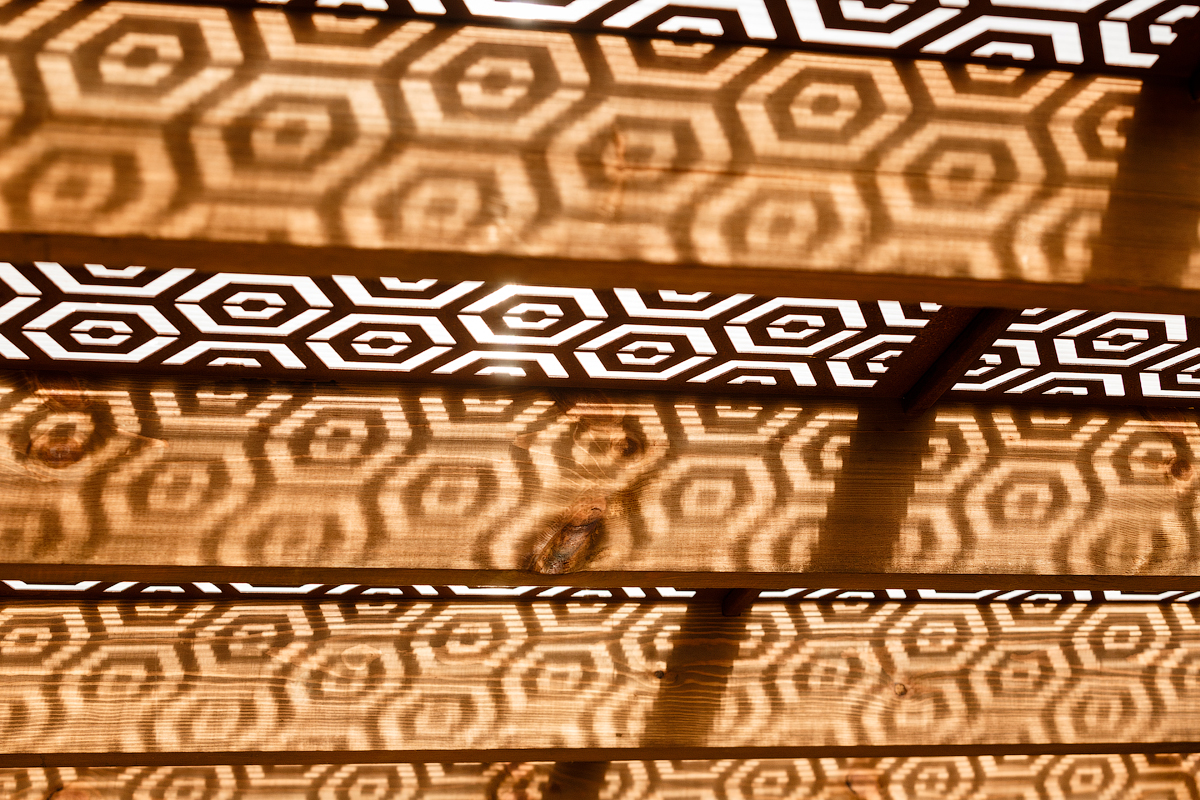

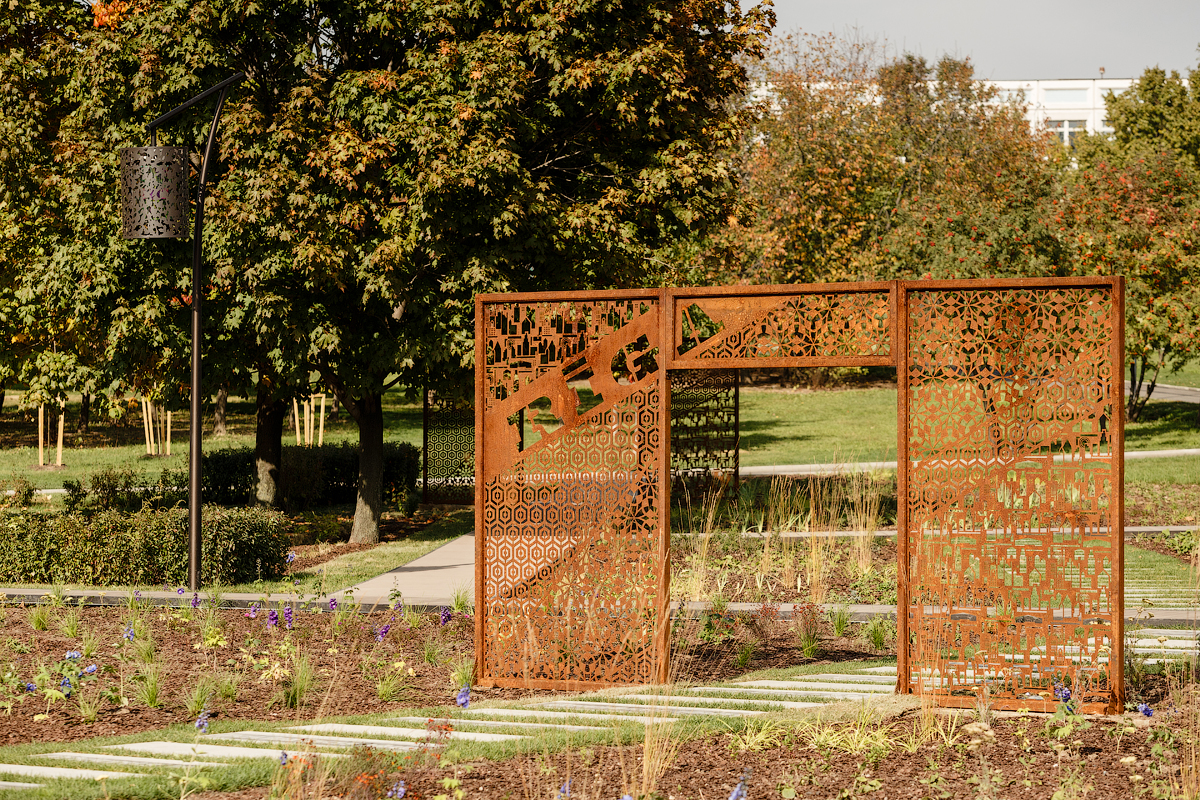

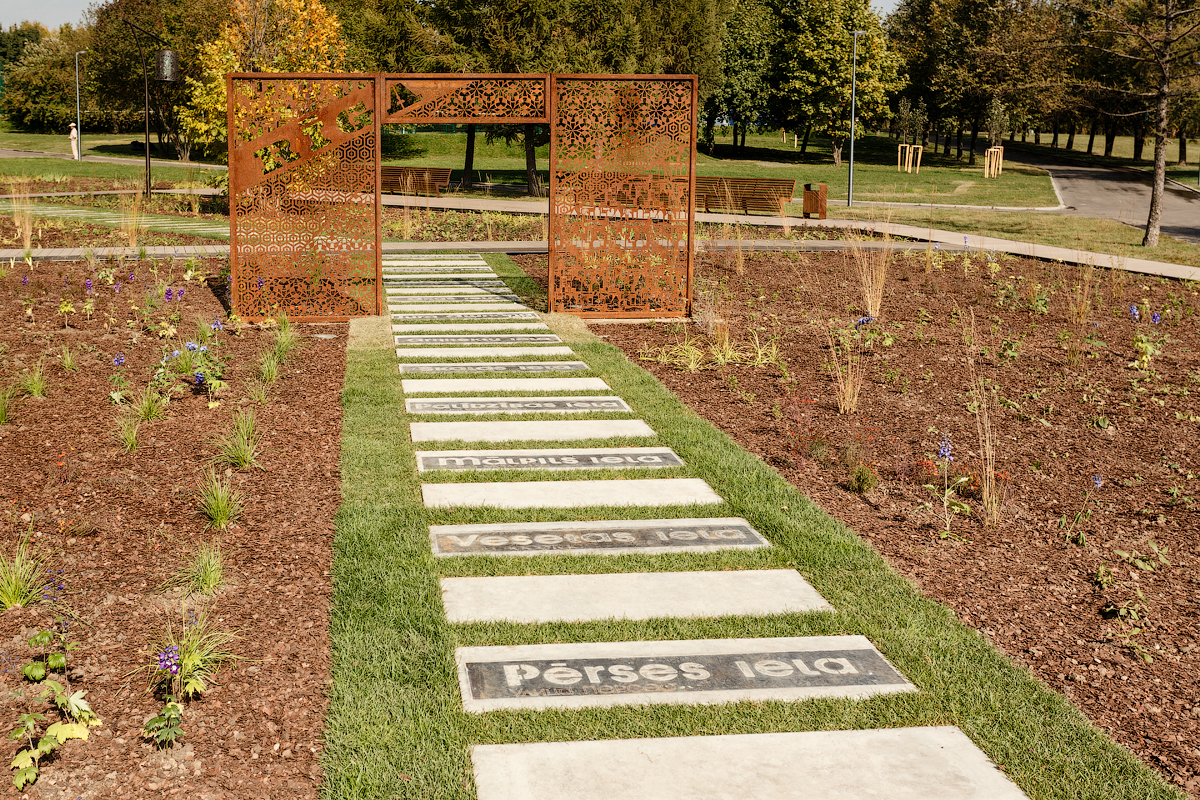

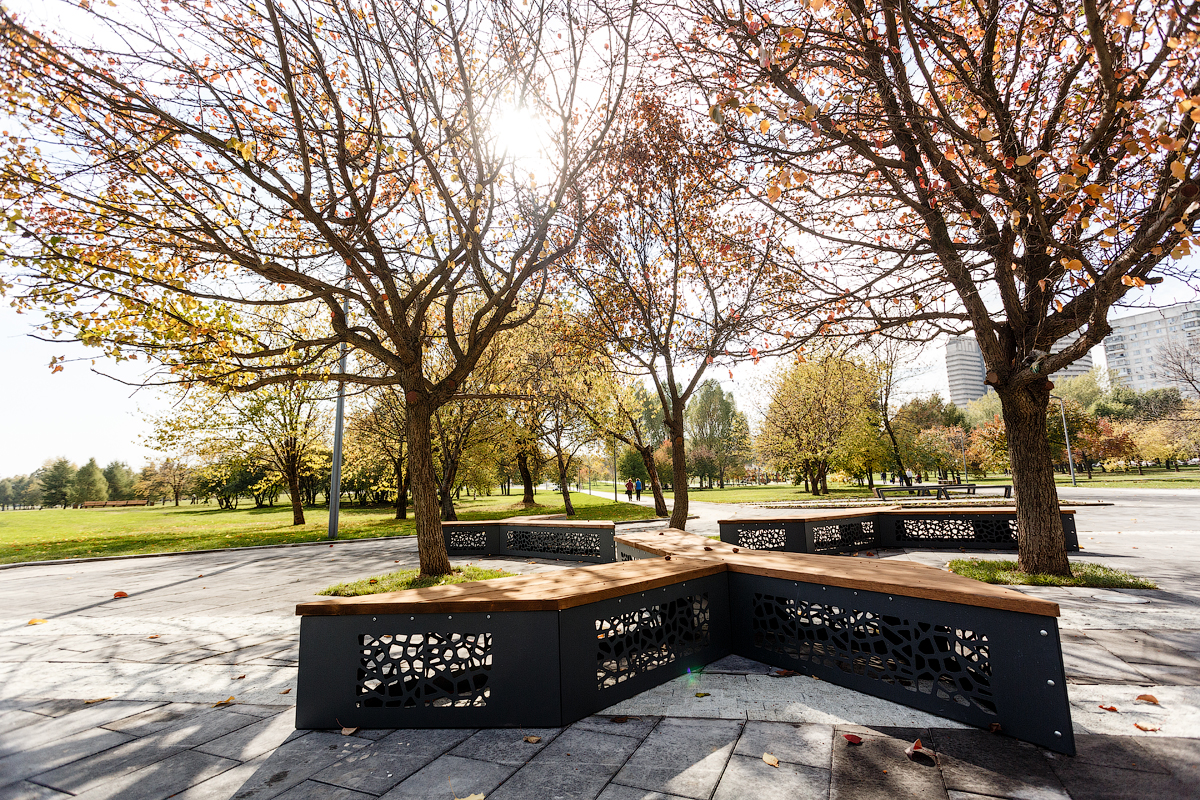

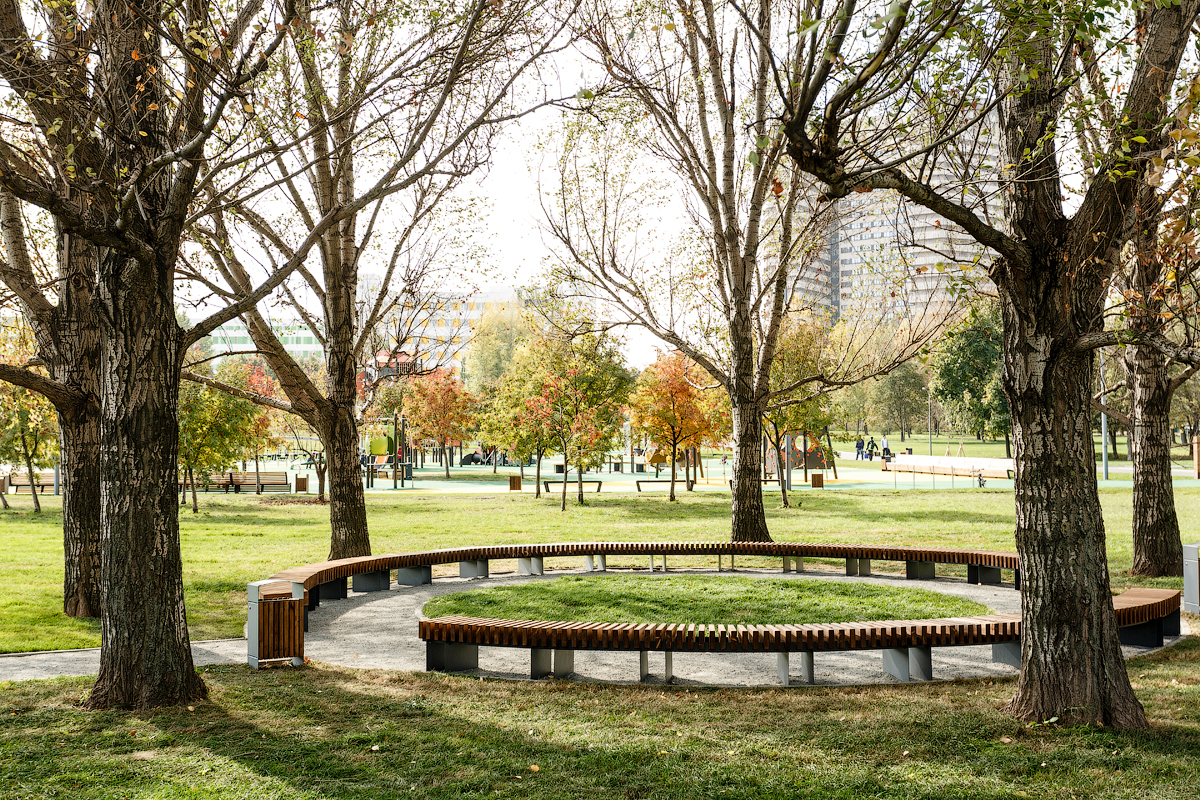

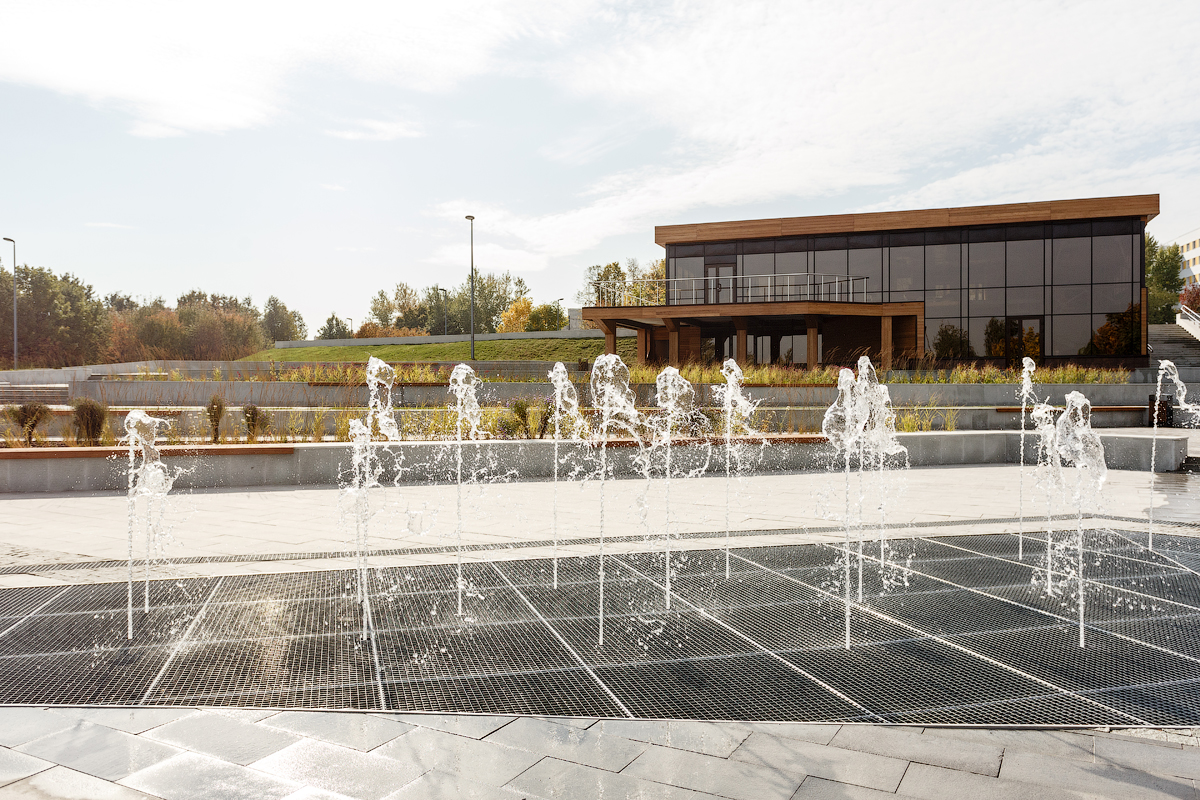

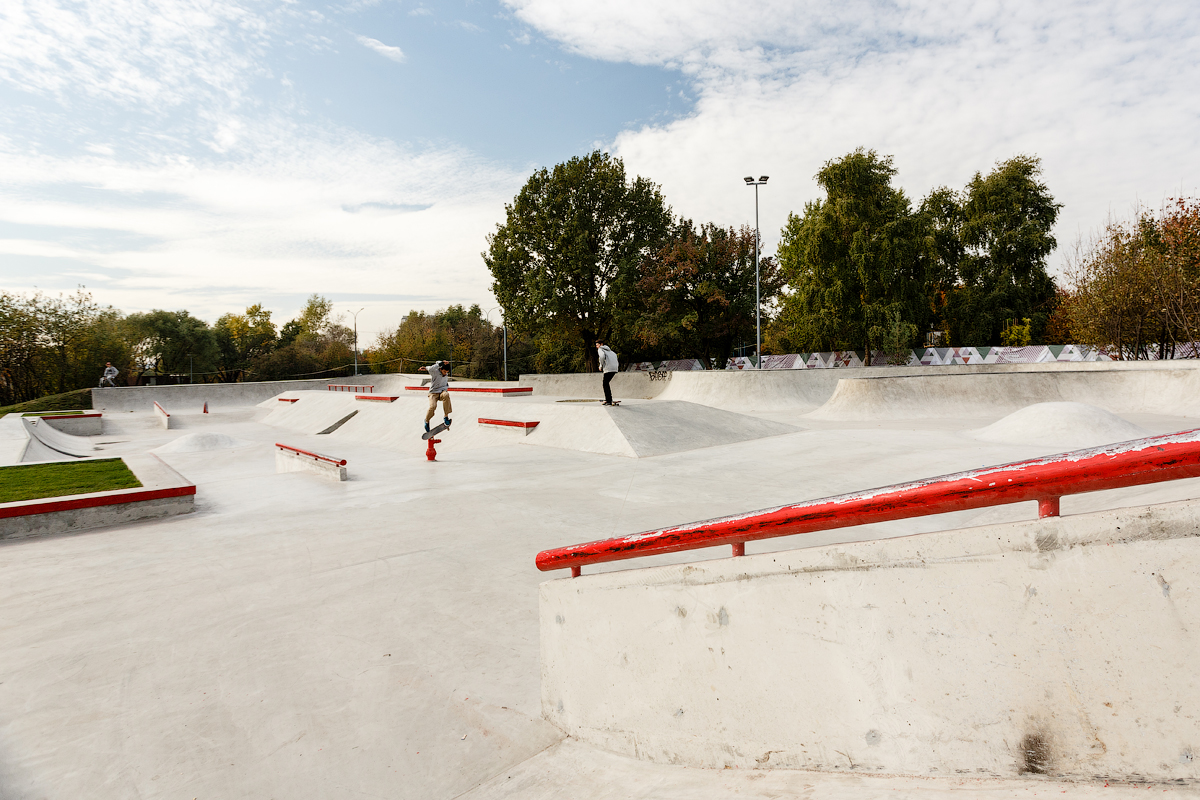

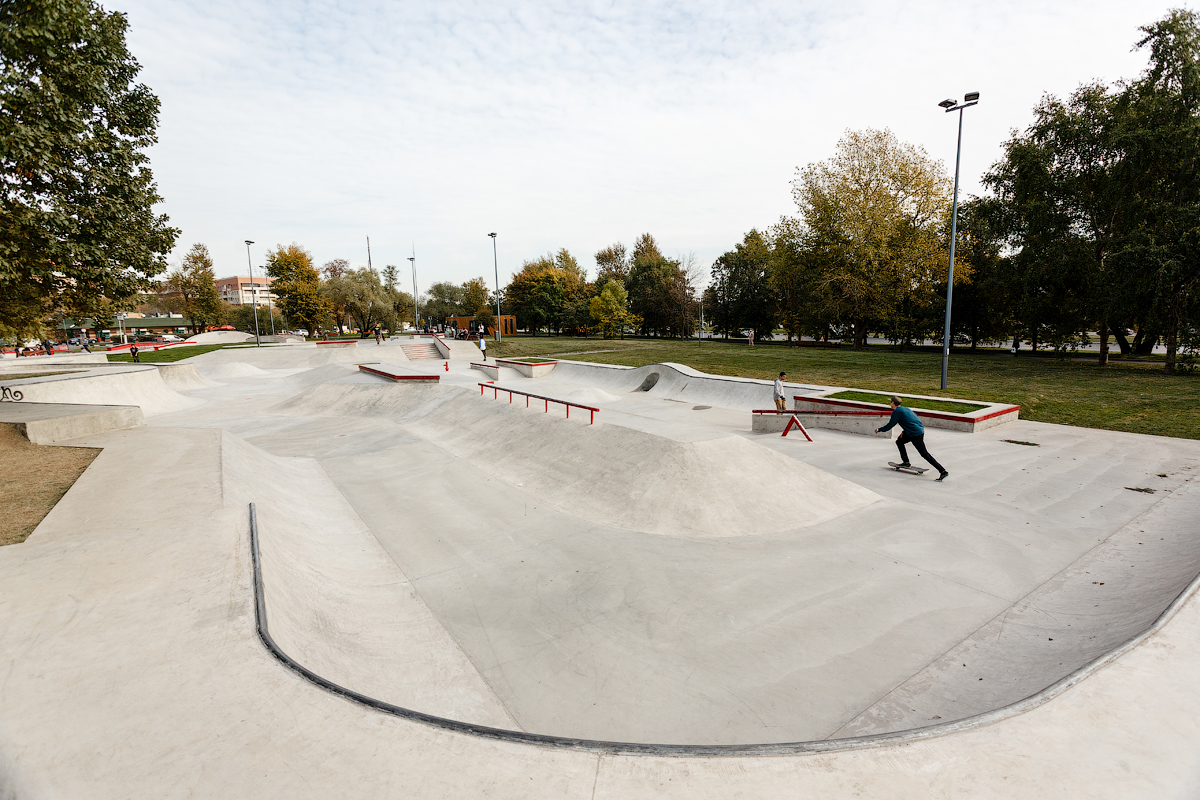
