= Avtozavodskaya (Moscow Central Circle) =

Station on the Moscow Central Circle

Avtozavodskaya Автозаводская
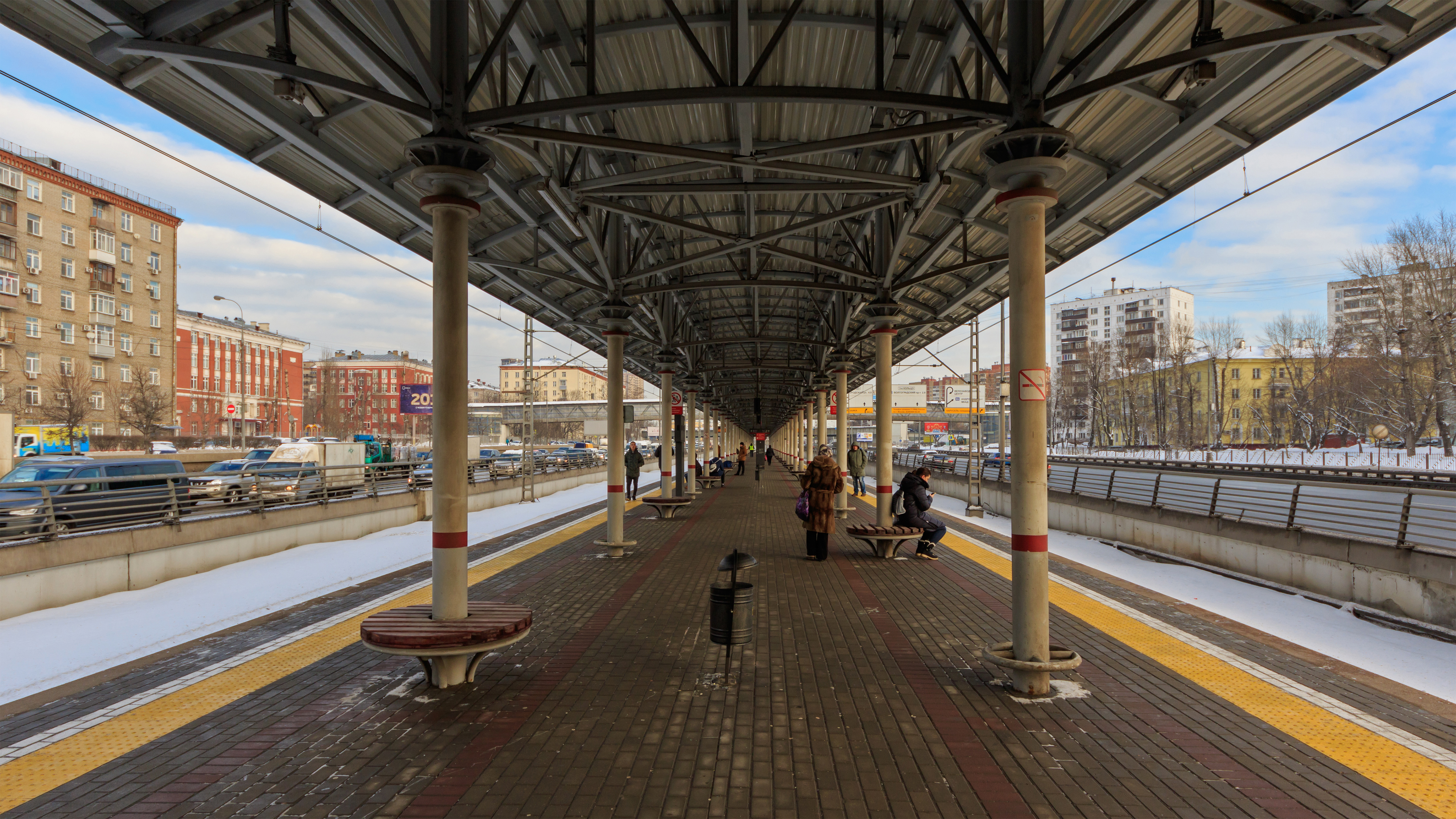

General information
- Coordinates: 55.7066°N 37.6636°E
- System: Moscow Metro
- Line: Moscow Central Circle
- Platforms: 1 island platform
- Tracks: 2

History
- Opened: 10 September 2016; 9 years ago

Services
Preceding station	Moscow Metro	Following station
Dubrovka anticlockwise / outer	Moscow Central Circle	ZIL clockwise / inner
Out-of-station interchange
Paveletskaya towards Khovrino	Zamoskvoretskaya line transfer at Avtozavodskaya	Tekhnopark towards Alma-Atinskaya
Route map
Location
- Location within Moscow Metro

Avtozavodskaya (Russian: Автозаво́дская, lit. auto factory) is a station on the Moscow Central Circle of the Moscow Metro that opened in September 2016. It offers out-of-station transfers to Avtozavodskaya on the Zamoskvoretskaya Line.

== Gallery ==
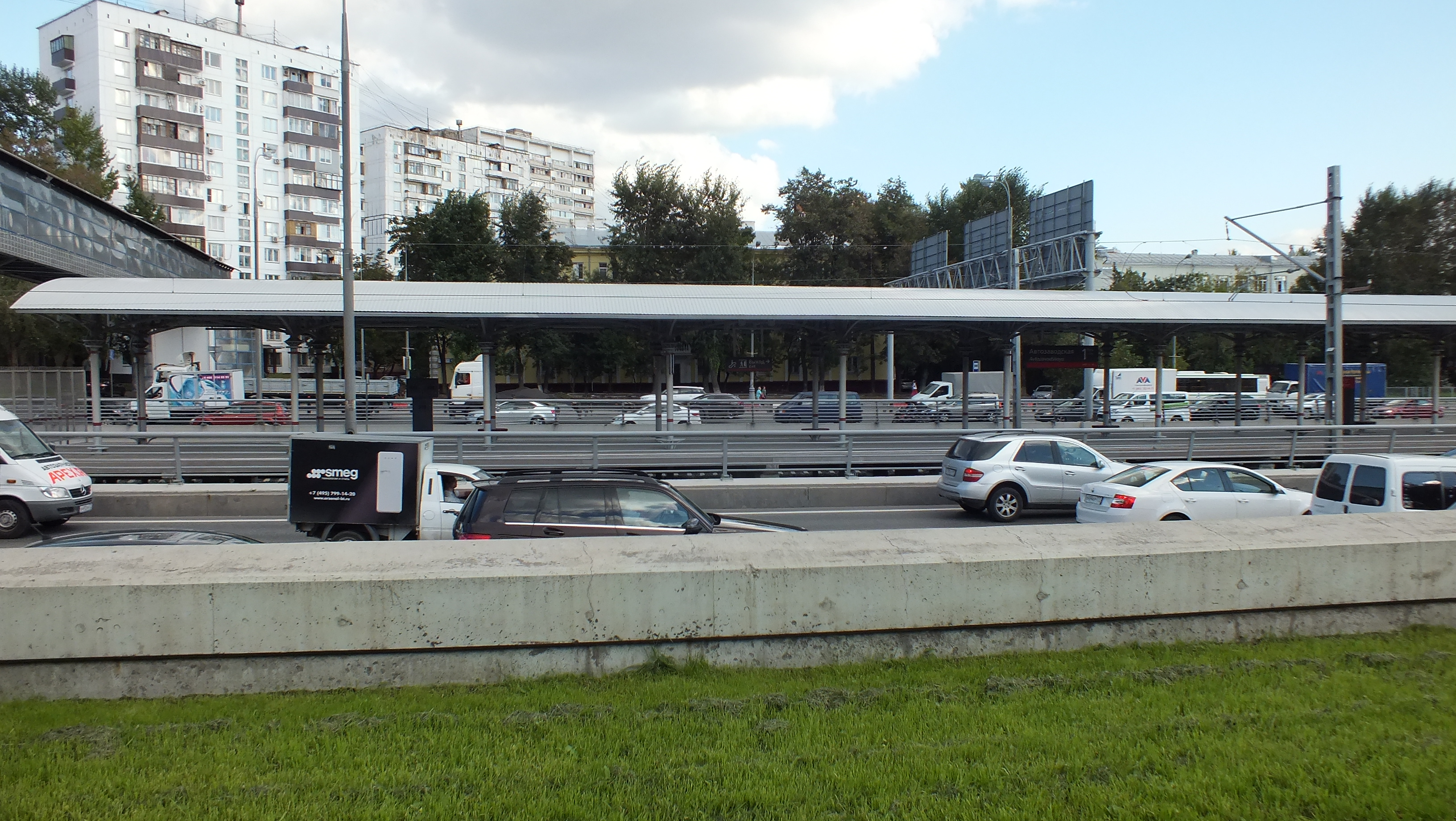
Construction in August, 2016

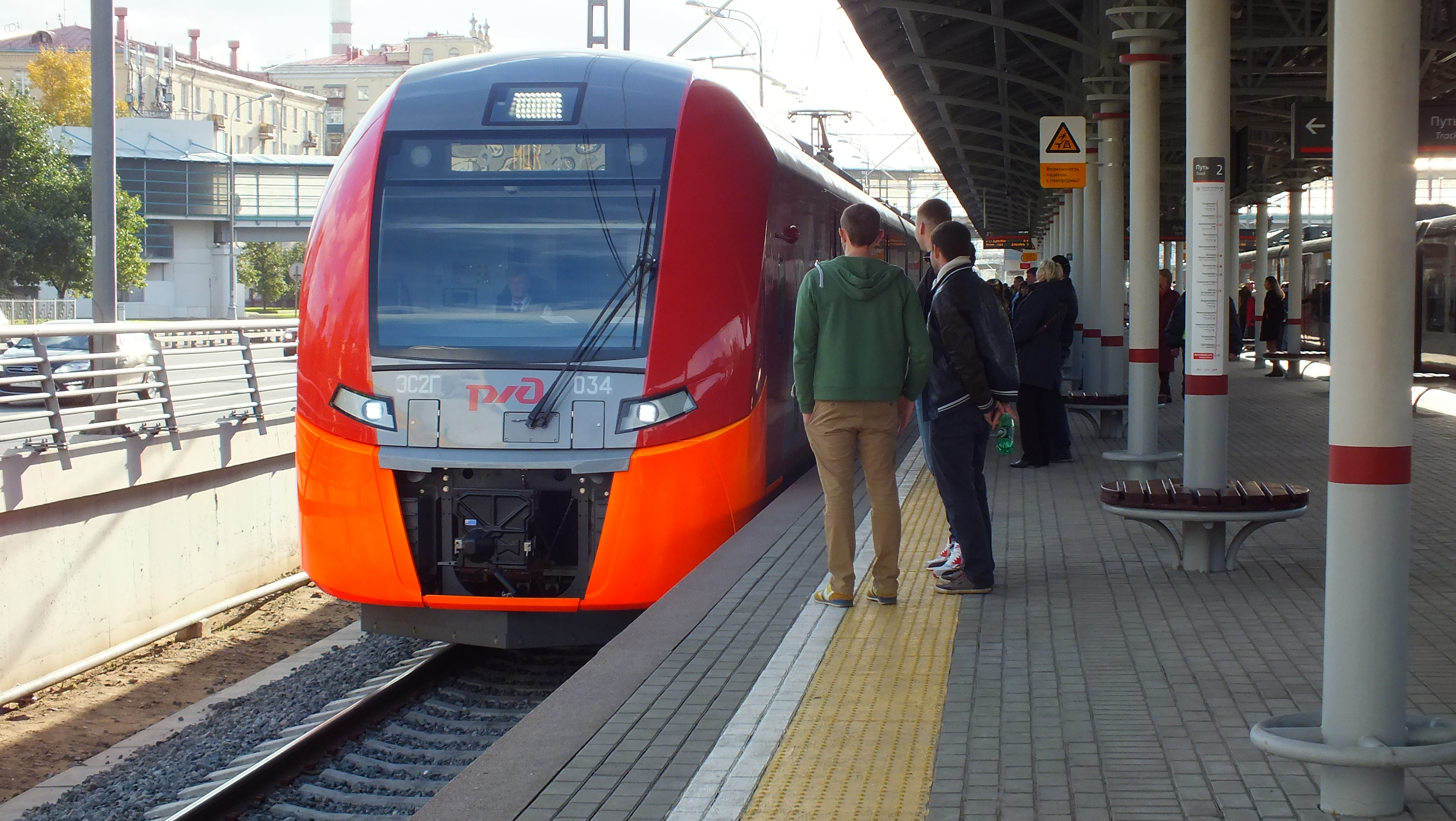
Train on station

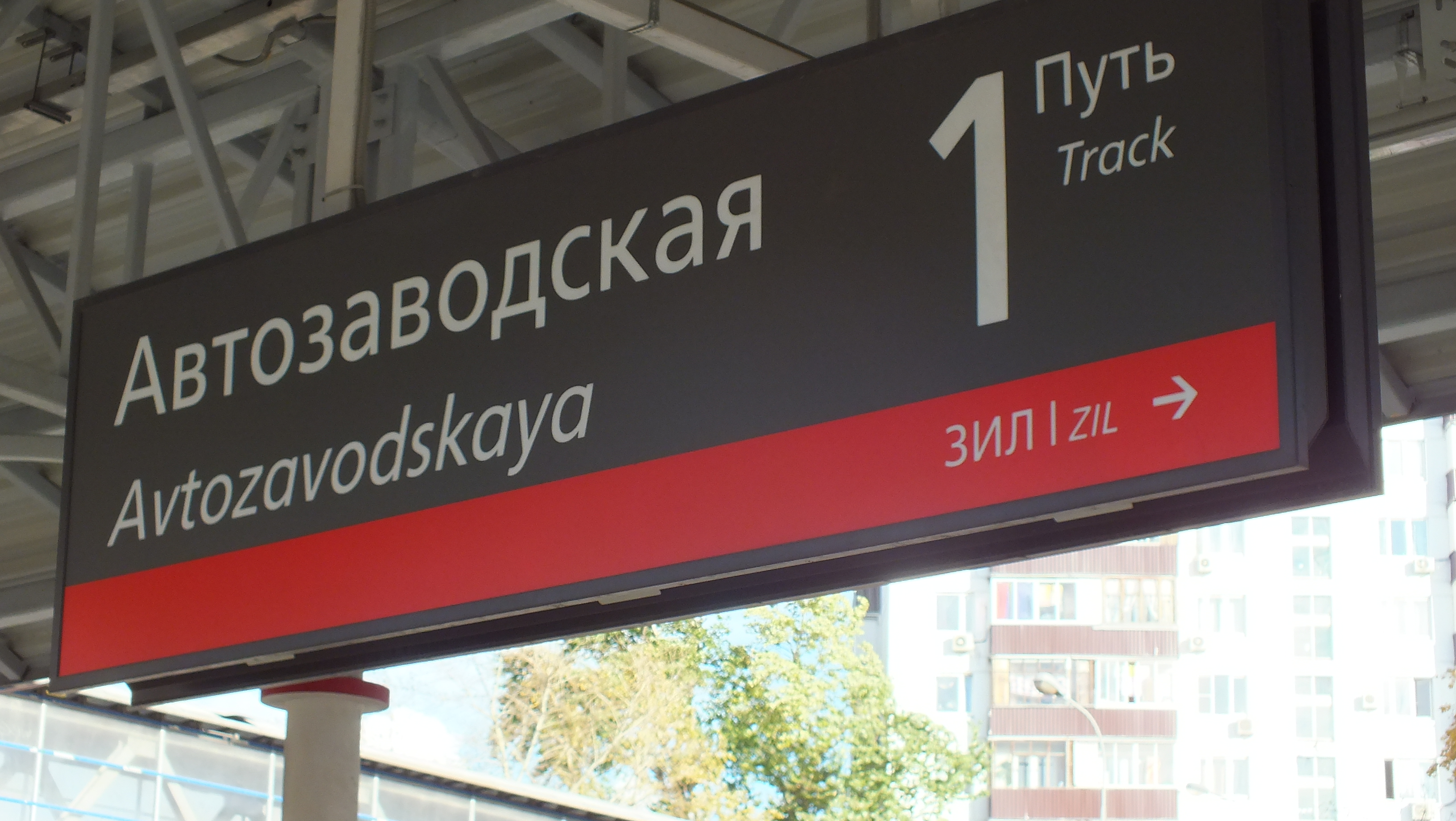
Station table
