= Tekhnopark (Zamoskvoretskaya line) =

Moscow Metro station

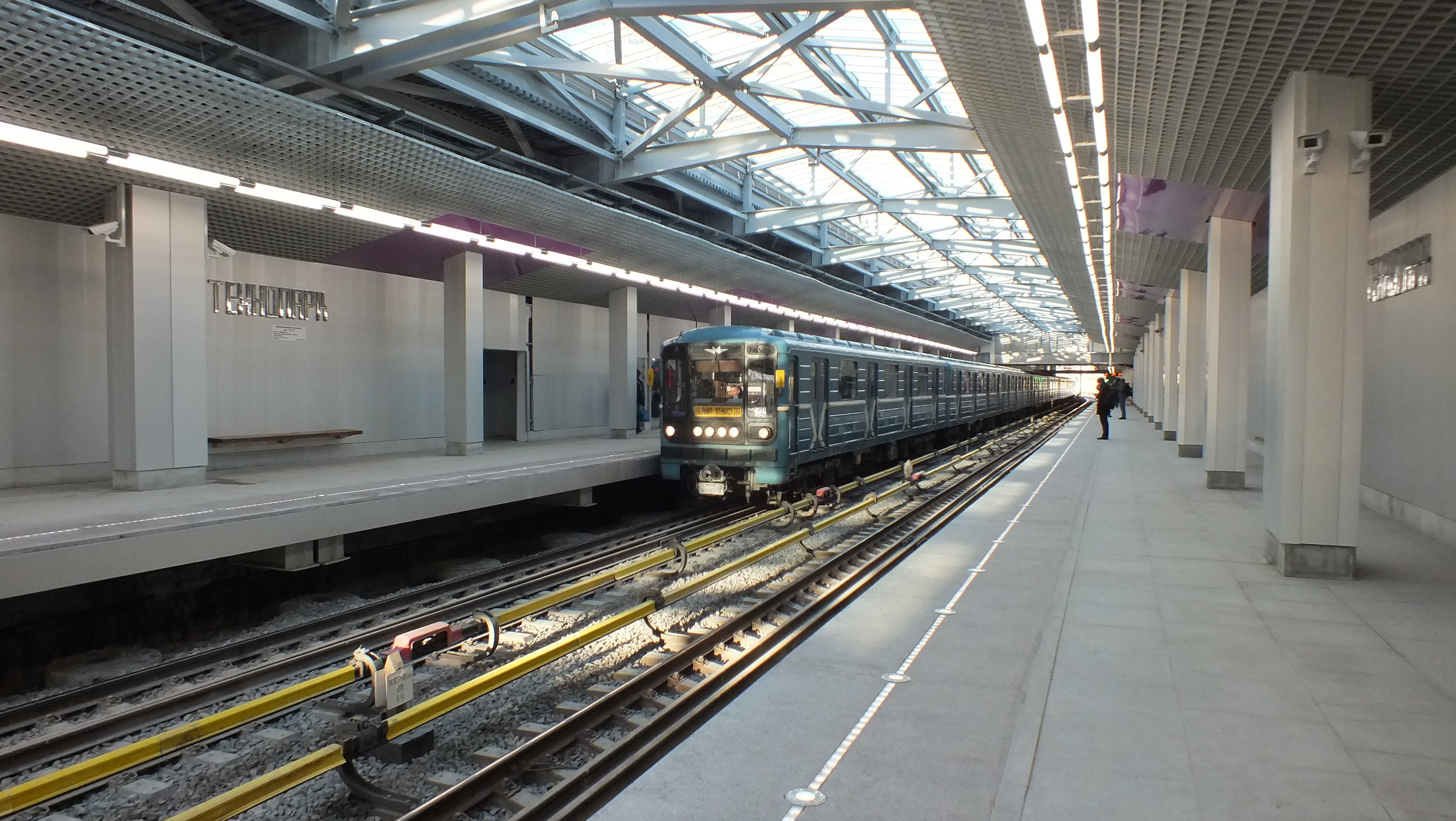

General information
- Location: Danilovsky District; Southern Administrative Okrug; Moscow; Russia
- Coordinates: 55.6933°N 37.6645°E
- System: Moscow Metro station
- Owner: Moskovsky Metropoliten
- Line: Zamoskvoretskaya line
- Platforms: 2 side platforms
- Tracks: 2
- Connections: Bus: е80, 831, с856, 888. Night routes: н13

Construction
- Structure type: Open
- Depth: ground level
- Platform levels: 1
- Parking: No

History
- Opened: 28 December 2015; 10 years ago

Services
Preceding station	Moscow Metro	Following station
Avtozavodskaya towards Khovrino	Zamoskvoretskaya line	Kolomenskaya towards Alma-Atinskaya
Out-of-station interchange
Avtozavodskaya anticlockwise / outer	Moscow Central Circle transfer at ZIL	Verkhniye Kotly clockwise / inner
Dubrovka anticlockwise / outer	Moscow Central Circle transfer at Avtozavodskaya	ZIL clockwise / inner
Route map
Location
- Location within Moscow Metro

Tekhnopark (Russian: Технопарк) is a station on the Moscow Metro's Zamoskvoretskaya Line, between Avtozavodskaya and Kolomenskaya stations. The station was opened on 28 December, 2015. It was constructed in the middle of a metro stretch already in operation. It has entrances to the Dream Island amusement park, Andropov and Likhachov avenues and Mustay Karim street.

== History ==
Construction began in February 2013. However, construction dates have changed, with construction begun in 2012.

The grade-level station is primarily supposed to serve the Nagatino i-Land technopark (Science park).

The stations was closed from 12 November 2022 to May 2023 due to the reconstruction works. A transfer to Ostov Mechty on the Biryulyovskaya line is planned in 2028.
