= Avtozavodskaya (Zamoskvoretskaya line) =

Moscow Metro station

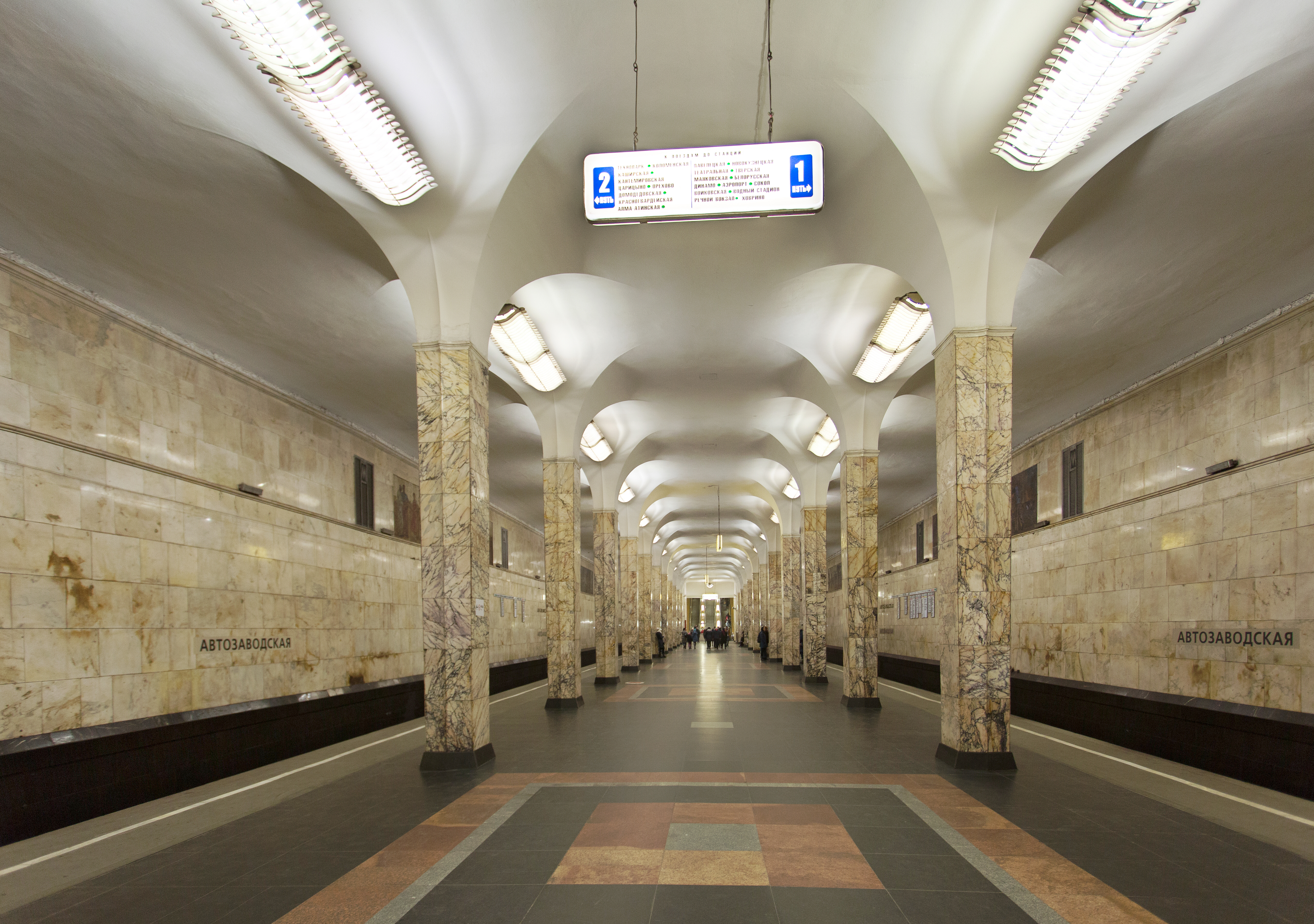

General information
- Location: Danilovsky District; Southern Administrative Okrug; Moscow; Russia
- Coordinates: 55.7074°N 37.6576°E
- System: Moscow Metro station
- Owner: Moskovsky Metropoliten
- Line: Zamoskvoretskaya line
- Platforms: 1 island platform
- Tracks: 2
- Connections: Bus: 766, c799, с835, 944.

Construction
- Depth: 11 metres (36 ft)
- Platform levels: 1
- Parking: No

Other information
- Station code: 029

History
- Opened: 1 January 1943; 83 years ago

Services
Preceding station	Moscow Metro	Following station
Paveletskaya towards Khovrino	Zamoskvoretskaya line	Tekhnopark towards Alma-Atinskaya
Out-of-station interchange
Dubrovka anticlockwise / outer	Moscow Central Circle transfer at Avtozavodskaya	ZIL clockwise / inner
Route map
Location
- Location within Moscow Metro

Avtozavodskaya (Russian: Автозаво́дская, lit. auto factory) is a station on the Zamoskvoretskaya line of the Moscow Metro. It is named for the nearby Zavod Imeni Likhacheva where ZIS and ZIL limousines were built. The train station was opened in 1943, a few months before Novokuznetskaya and Paveletskaya. The architect was Alexey Dushkin. From 1943 to 1969 when Kakhovskaya opened, it was the southern terminus of the line. The station has entrances to Avtozavodskaya and Masterkov streets.

== History ==
When the station was opened in 1943, it was named Zavod Imeni Stalina after the factory at the site. As part of the destalinization process, the factory's name changed to Zavod Imeni Likhacheva in 1956 and the station became Avtozavodskaya. Parts of the former factory have been demolished to accommodate the construction of a residential complex; however, the name remains in place.

Both the tall pillars and walls are faced with pinkish Oraktuoy marble. Additionally, Avtozavodskaya is decorated with eight mosaics depicting events of the Great Patriotic War.

On February 6, 2004, a suicide bomber set off an explosion between Avtozavodskaya and Paveletskaya in which 41 people were killed and 250 were injured.

There are future plans to construct a transfer station with the same name to the Nekrasovskaya and Troitskaya lines when they fusion together.
