= Nagatino-Sadovniki District =

Nagatino-Sadovniki District Район Нагатино-Садовники (Russian)
- District
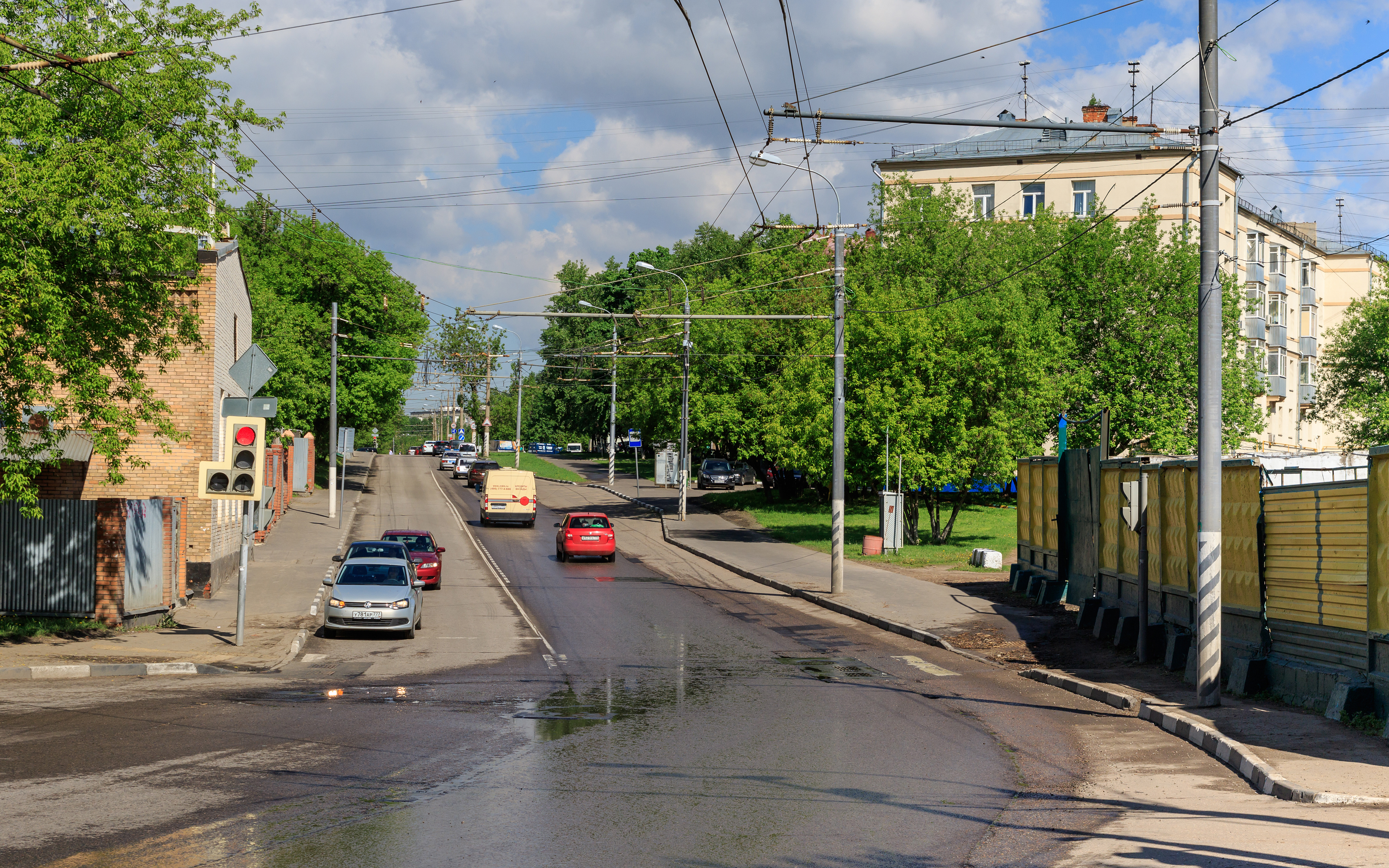
- Nagatino-Sadovniki Sadovniki Street, Nagatino-Sadovniki District

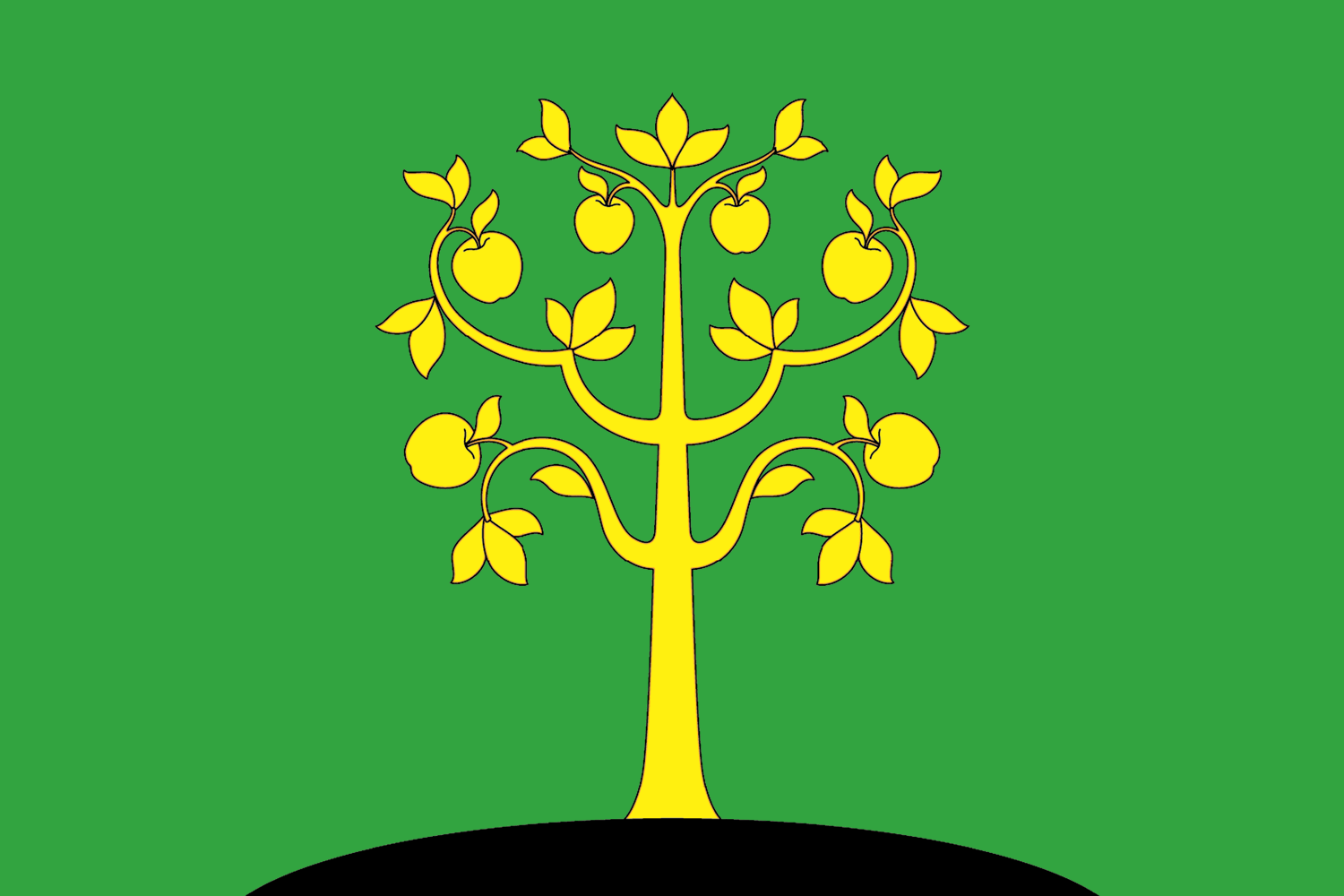
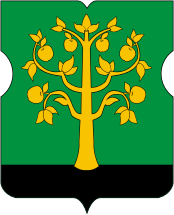
- Flag Coat of arms
- Location of Nagatino-Sadovniki District on the map of Moscow
- Coordinates: 55°40′30″N 37°39′00″E
- Country: Russia
- Federal subject: Moscow
- Time zone: UTC+
- OKTMO ID: 45918000
- Website: http://nagatino-sadovniki.mos.ru/

Nagatino-Sadovniki District (Russian: райо́н Нагатино-Садовники) is an administrative district (raion) of Southern Administrative Okrug, and one of the 125 raions of Moscow, Russia. The area of the district is 8.17 square kilometers (3.15 sq mi).

== District indicators ==
As of 2015, the area of the district is 817 hectares. The population is 83,390 people (2024). The population is 9213.6 people/km2, the area of the housing stock is nearly 960.4 thousand m2 (2015).

== The history of the district ==
In 1991, the old division into districts of Moscow was abolished. Instead, administrative districts were formed, among which the Southern Administrative District appeared. The Nagatino-Sadovniki temporary Municipal District was further created as part of the Southern Administrative District. On July 5, 1995, it was transformed into the Nagatino-Sadovniki district of Moscow.

== District boundaries ==
The boundaries of the Nagatino-Sadovniki district are determined by the law "On the Territorial Division of the City of Moscow" and according to it they run: along the axis of Andropov Avenue, then along the western borders of the territory of the Kolomenskoye Museum-Reserve, axes: Kashirskoye Highway, projected passage N 3689, axes of the allotment lanes of the Paveletsky railway branch of the Moscow Railway, the axis of the Warsaw Highway, the axes of the right-of-way of the Small Ring of the Moscow Railway, the axis of the Moscow riverbed, the axis of the Nagatinsky straightening of the Moskva River to Andropov Avenue.

== Parks and squares ==
Veterans Square is located at the intersection of Sadovniki and Nagatinskaya streets. After landscaping in 2019, a walking alley with canopies, a pergola, a summer stage where artists and musicians perform, a recreation area and tables for board games were created here. The "Walk of Fame" was opened — a memorable place with photos and stories of war veterans who live in Nagatin-Sadovniki.

The apple Orchard is located along Kolomenskoye Passage. During the landscaping, a pedestrian zone was created here, lighting was carried out, benches, urns were installed, pedestrian paths were equipped, terraces were made for recreation, information stands were installed on which information about the history of the district is posted. An art object in the form of an apple tree was also installed.

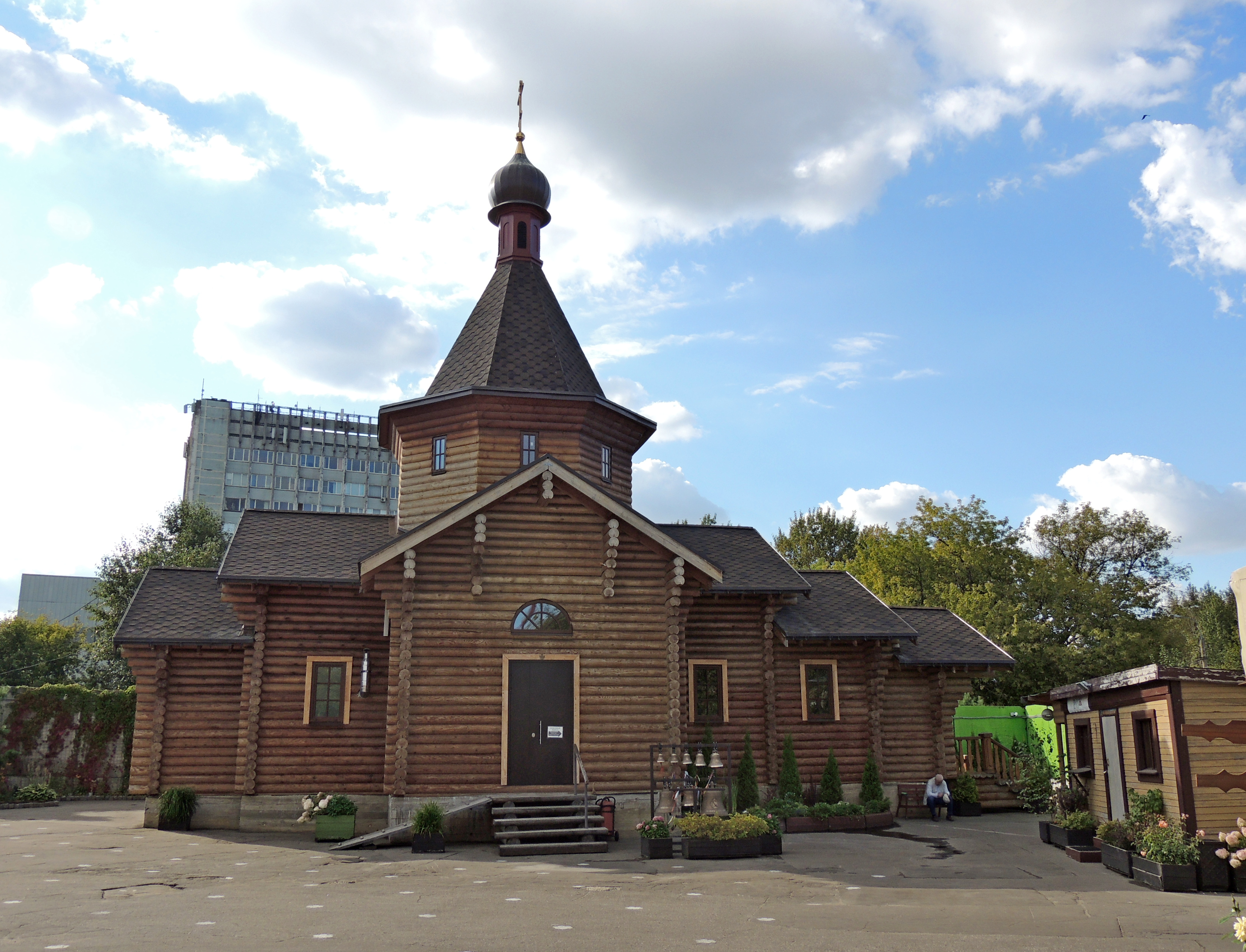
The Church of Saint Alexius in Sadovniki

Yu. M. Luzhkov Park (formerly "Sadovniki") is located on Andropov Avenue. The road and path network has been repaired in the park, landscaping has been carried out, benches, urns, gazebos, bicycle parking have been installed. The park also has three modern playgrounds for children of different ages, sports grounds (a multifunctional playground, two volleyball courts, a tennis court, a ping-pong court, a workout), a chess club pavilion, running and cycling routes, a dance floor and a dog walking area. In addition, a concrete skate park with an area of 2,750 square meters has been created here.

== Population ==
Year	Population
2002	69 031
2010	▲76 284
2012	▲76 907
2013	▲77 263
2014	▲78 432
2015	▲79 416
2016	▲81 400
2017	▲82 064
2018	▲82 836
2019	▲83 607
2020	▲83 607
2021	▼83 046
2023	▲83 658
2024	▼83 390

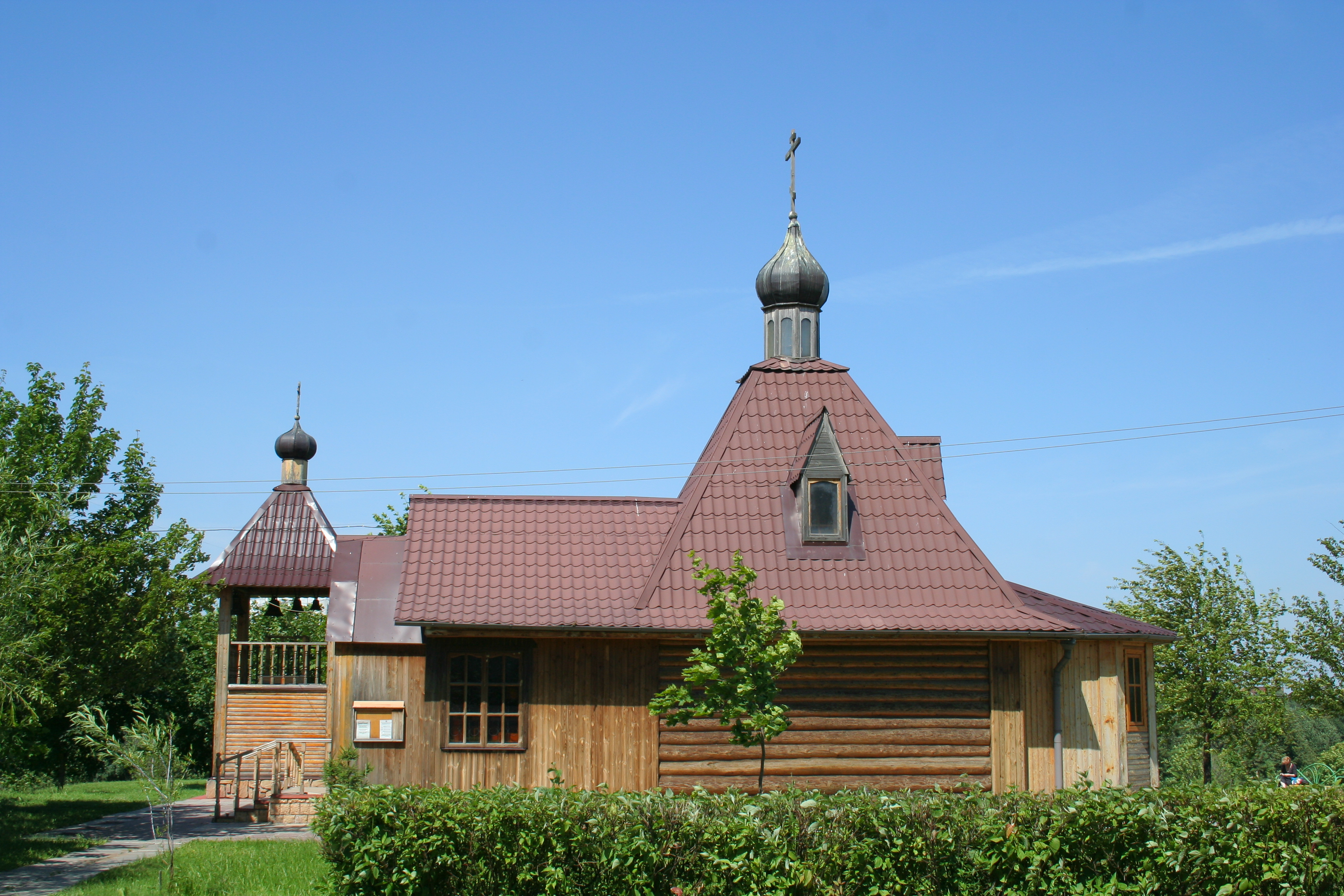
The Church of the Prince Dimitri Donskoy in Sadovniki

== See also ==
- Administrative divisions of Moscow
- Sadovniki (park)
