= Preobrazhensky Metro Bridge =

Bridge in Moscow, Russia

Coordinates: 55°47′48″N 37°42′07″E

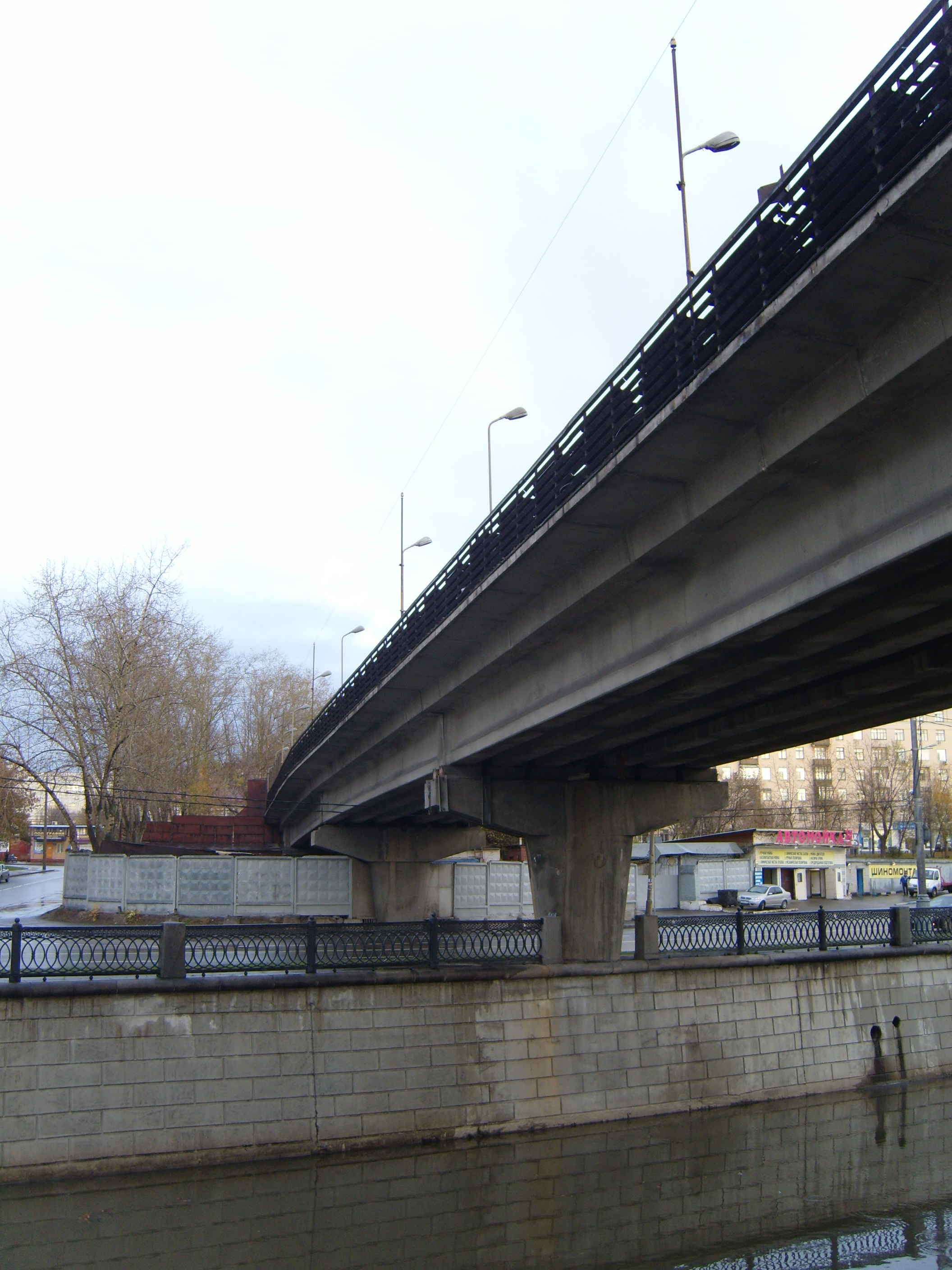
Preobrazhenskiy Metro Bridge

Preobrazhenskiy Metro Bridge is the shortest (330 metres) of four rail bridges in Moscow, Russia. It is located in the Eastern Administrative Okrug of the city. It spans over Yauza River and is a part of the Sokolnicheskaya Line of Moscow Metro. It connects the stations Preobrazhenskaya Ploshchad and Sokolniki.

Metro Bridge was opened on 31 December 1965 together with the Preobrazhenskaya Ploshchad metro station.
