= German Getsevich =

Russian writer (1961–2021)

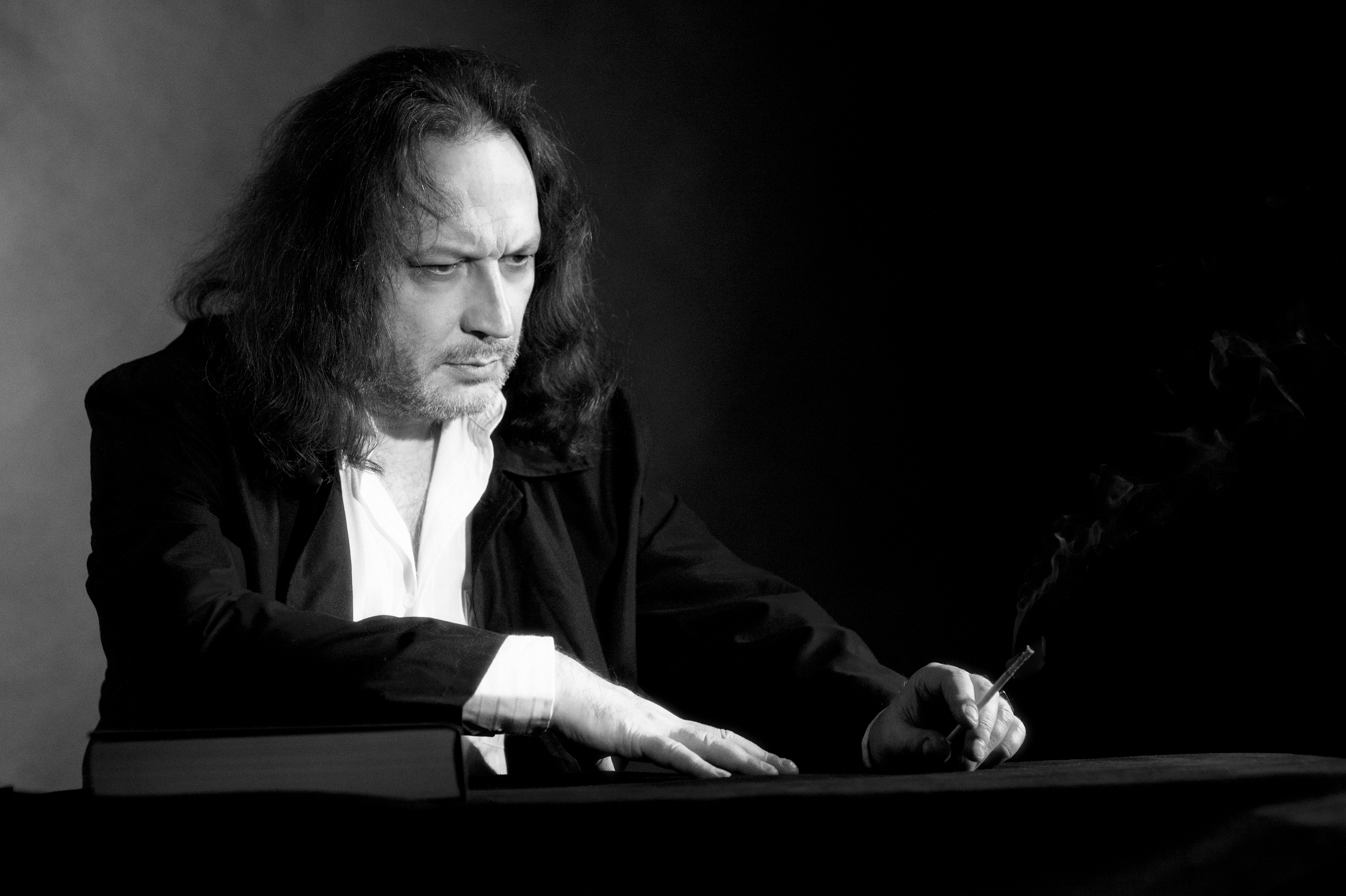
- Getsevich in 2016
- Born: October 28, 1961; Moscow, Russian SFSR, Soviet Union
- Died: September 1, 2021 (aged 59); Moscow, Russia
- Writing career
- Genres: poetry children's literature

German Alexandrovich Getsevich (Russian: Герман Александрович Гецевич; October 28, 1961, Moscow — September 1, 2021, ib.) was a Russian poet, prose writer, translator.

== Biography ==
Getsevich was born on October 28, 1961, in Moscow in a family of employees. His mother was Rimma Vasilievna Getsevich, a chemical engineer (1938-2008), and father Alexander Iosifovich Kogan (1921–2019), a military dermatologist, candidate of medical sciences, and participant of the Great Patriotic War. His stepfather was Boris Grigorievich Milovanov (1925-2010), a master pastry chef and head of the shop. German spent his childhood and youth in Sokolniki District. From 1981 to 1982 he served in the Soviet Army, in the Transcaucasian Military District. Received a medical degree, from 1981 to 2009 he worked for emergency medical services. He tried to enter the Maxim Gorky Literature Institute, but was not accepted. For the first time, Getsevich's poems were published in 1992.

According to Getsevich, the first poet he knew and fell in love with was Sergei Yesenin. For the first time, Getsevich's poems were published in 1992.

Andrei Voznesensky gave a capacious definition to the work of German Getsevich: He has sunk into the word. He scalps the word, tries to figure out the code of the language, and therefore of life. Even in the traditional poem about the fly, the humming of the spirit is encoded.
