= Sokolniki (Bolshaya Koltsevaya line) =

Metro station in Moscow, Russia

Sokolniki Сокольники
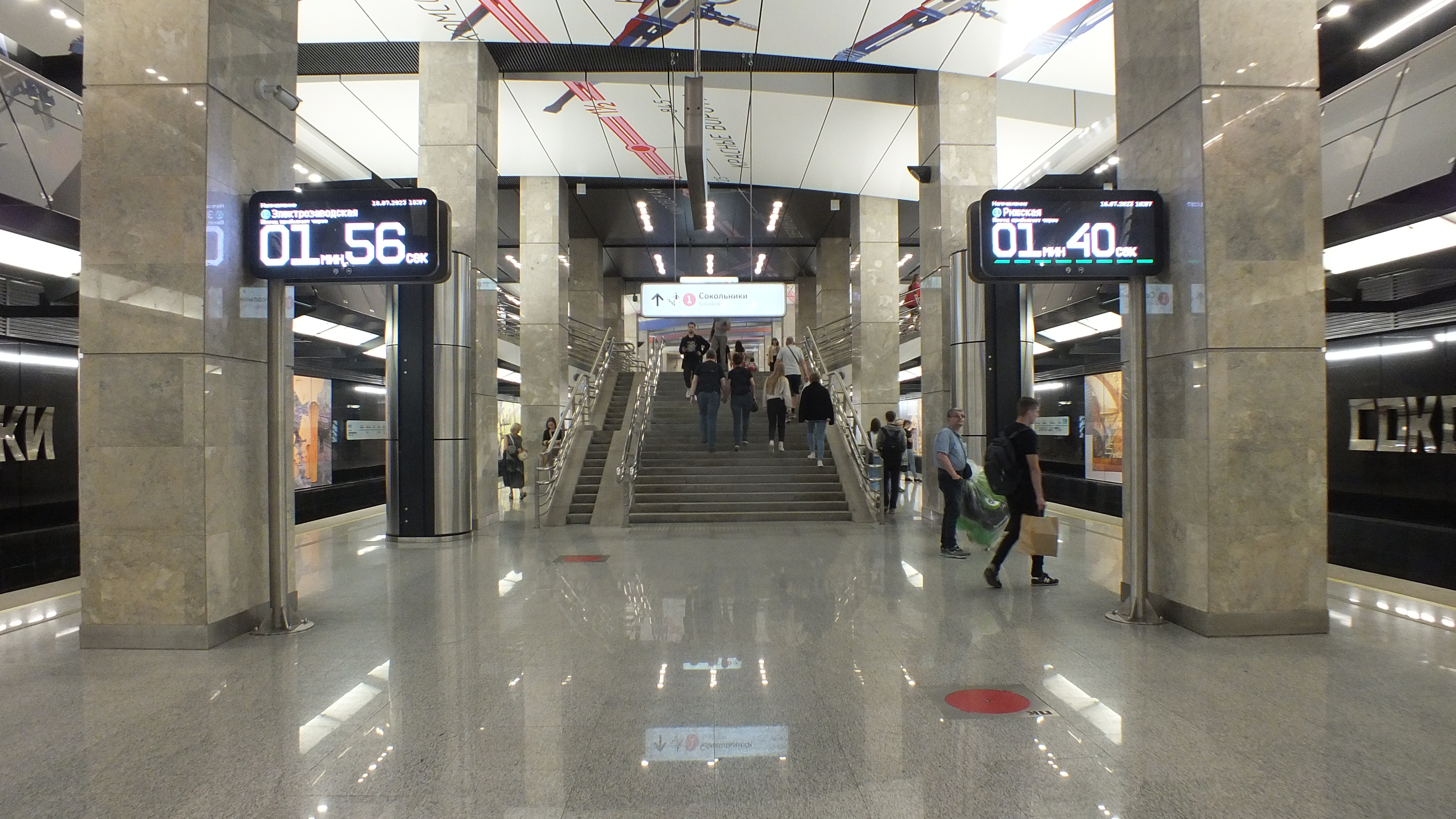

General information
- Location: Moscow; Russia
- System: Moscow Metro station
- Owner: Moskovsky Metropoliten

History
- Opened: 1 March 2023

Services
Preceding station	Moscow Metro	Following station
Rizhskaya anticlockwise / outer	Bolshaya Koltsevaya line	Elektrozavodskaya clockwise / inner
Krasnoselskaya towards Potapovo	Sokolnicheskaya line transfer at Sokolniki	Preobrazhenskaya Ploshchad towards Bulvar Rokossovskogo
Route map
Bolshaya Koltsevaya line
Location
- Location within Moscow Metro

Sokolniki (Russian: Сокольники) is a station on the Bolshaya Koltsevaya line of the Moscow Metro. A transfer to Sokolniki is planned. It was opened on 1 March 2023.

== Gallery ==
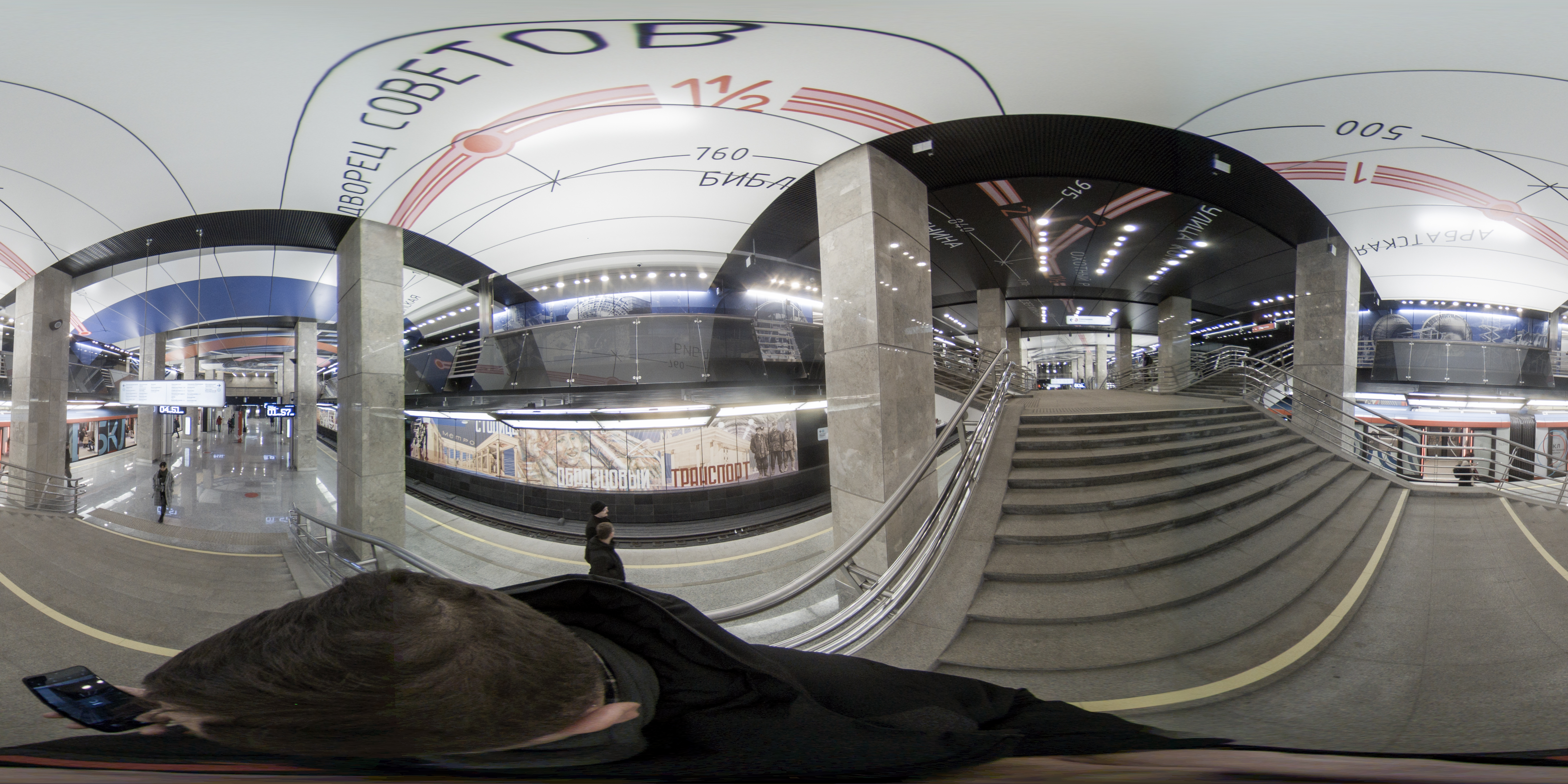
Station main hall with stairs to line 1 (view as a 360° interactive panorama)

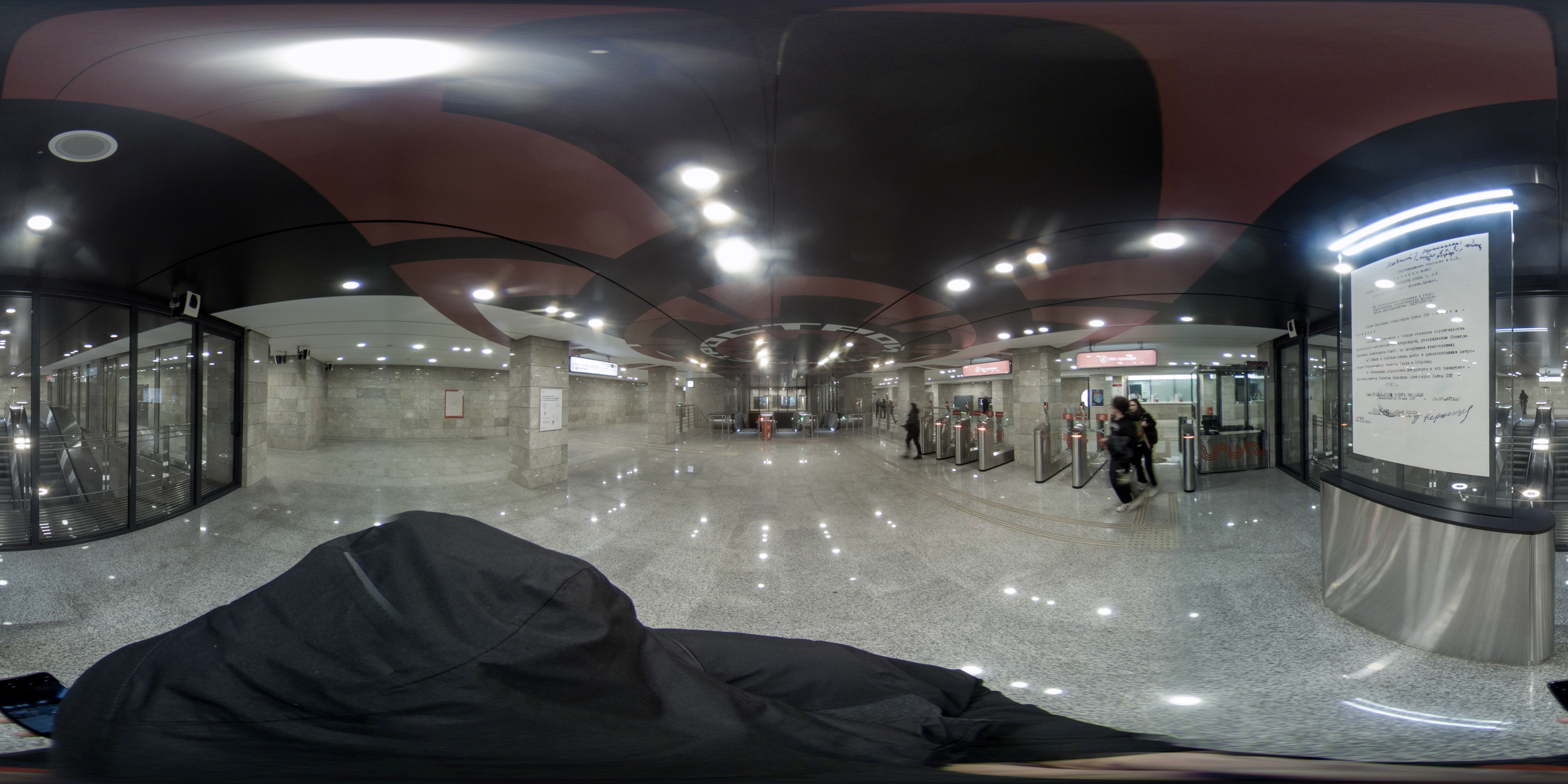
Upper hall (view as a 360° interactive panorama)

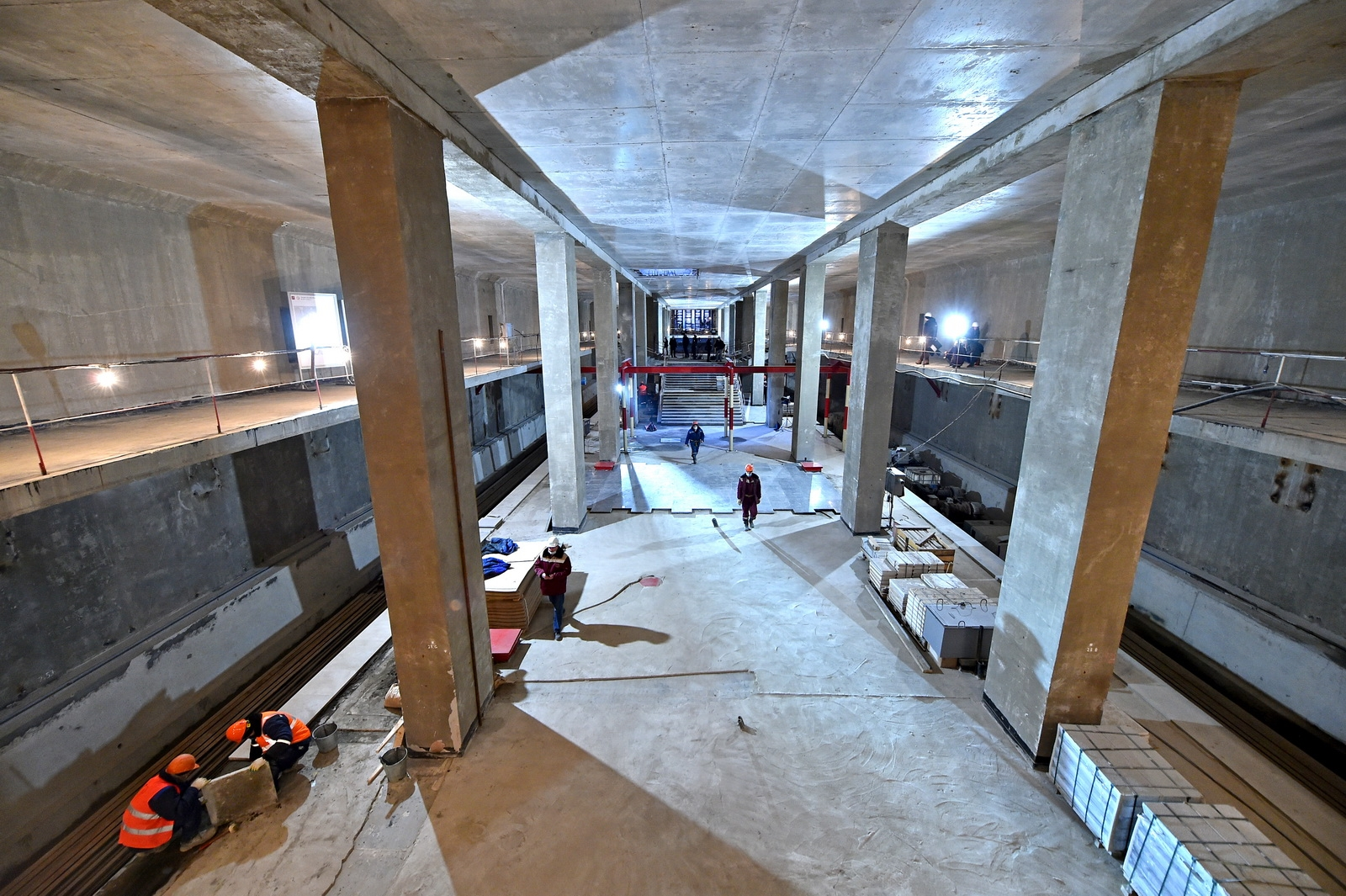
November 2020

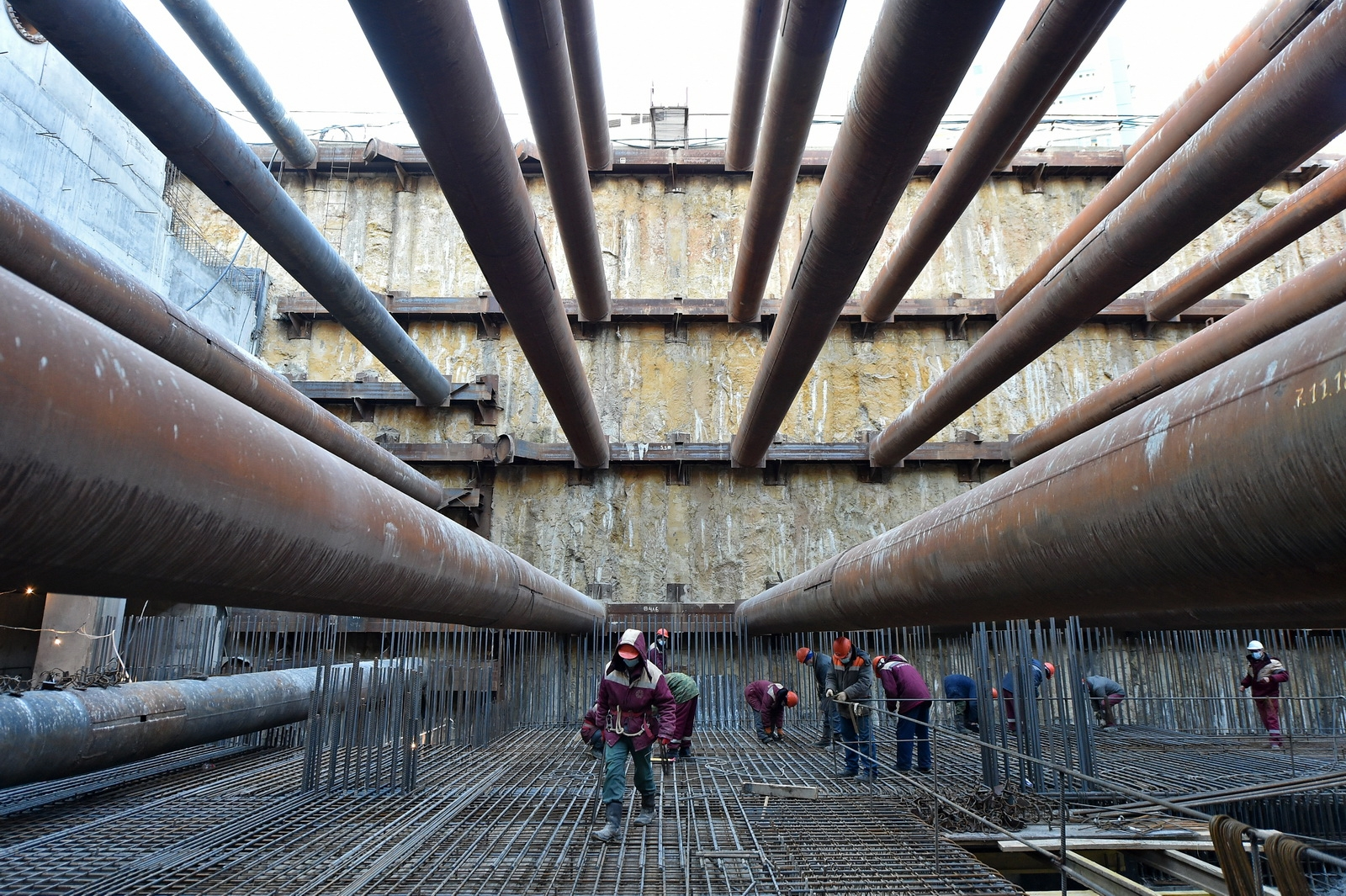
