= Sokolniki (Sokolnicheskaya line) =

Moscow Metro station

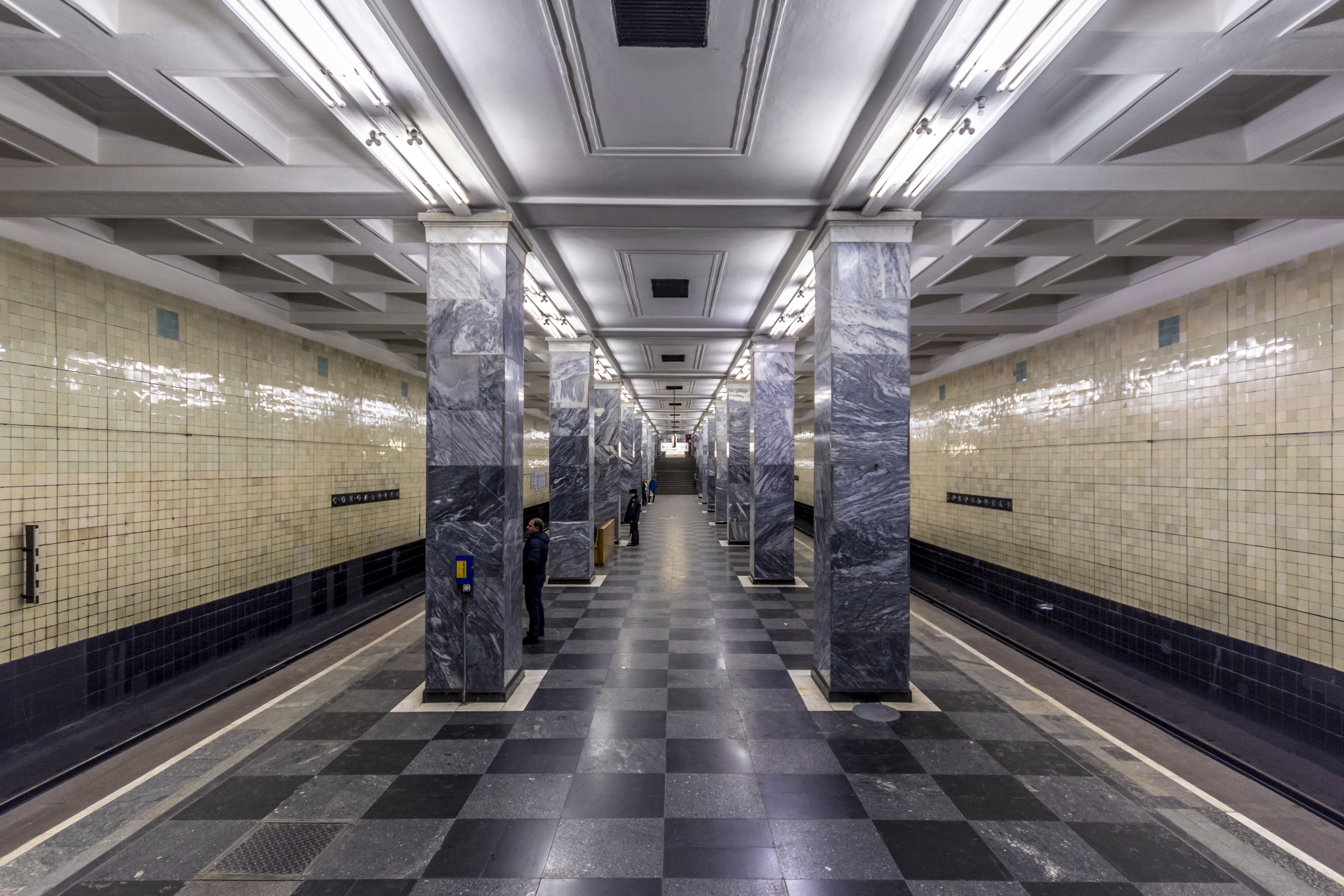

General information
- Location: Rusakovskaya Street; Sokolniki District; Eastern Administrative Okrug; Moscow; Russia
- Coordinates: 55.7888°N 37.6802°E
- System: Moscow Metro station
- Owner: Moskovsky Metropoliten
- Line: Sokolnicheskaya line
- Platforms: 1 island platform
- Tracks: 2
- Connections: Bus: 40, 75, 78, 122, 140, 239, 265, 716, 783; Trolleybus: 14, 32, 41; Tram: 4, 7, 13, 33, 45

Construction
- Structure type: Shallow column tri-vault
- Depth: 9 metres (30 ft)
- Platform levels: 1
- Parking: No
- Cycle facilities: No

Other information
- Station code: 004

History
- Opened: 15 May 1935; 91 years ago

Services
Preceding station	Moscow Metro	Following station
Krasnoselskaya towards Potapovo	Sokolnicheskaya line	Preobrazhenskaya Ploshchad towards Bulvar Rokossovskogo
Rizhskaya anticlockwise / outer	Bolshaya Koltsevaya line transfer at Sokolniki	Elektrozavodskaya clockwise / inner
Route map
Location
- Location within Moscow Metro

Sokolniki (Russian: Соко́льники) is a Moscow Metro station in the Sokolniki District, Eastern Administrative Okrug, Moscow. It is on the Sokolnicheskaya Line, between Krasnoselskaya and Preobrazhenskaya Ploshchad stations. It is located under Rusakovskaya street at the foot of Sokolnicheskaya Square and was part of the first Metro line. The station is named after the nearby Sokolniki Park. It has a transfer at its namesake on the Bolshaya Koltsevaya line.

== History ==
The northeastern end of the line, including Sokolniki, was built using the cut and cover method. The tunnels from Krasnoselskaya to Sokolniki were under construction as early as the summer of 1933, but work did not begin on the station itself until March 1934. The concrete shell of the station was completed in just five months, and Sokolniki opened along with the rest of the line on 15 May 1935. The first test run of the Metro took place in 1934 between Sokolniki and Komsomolskaya stations.

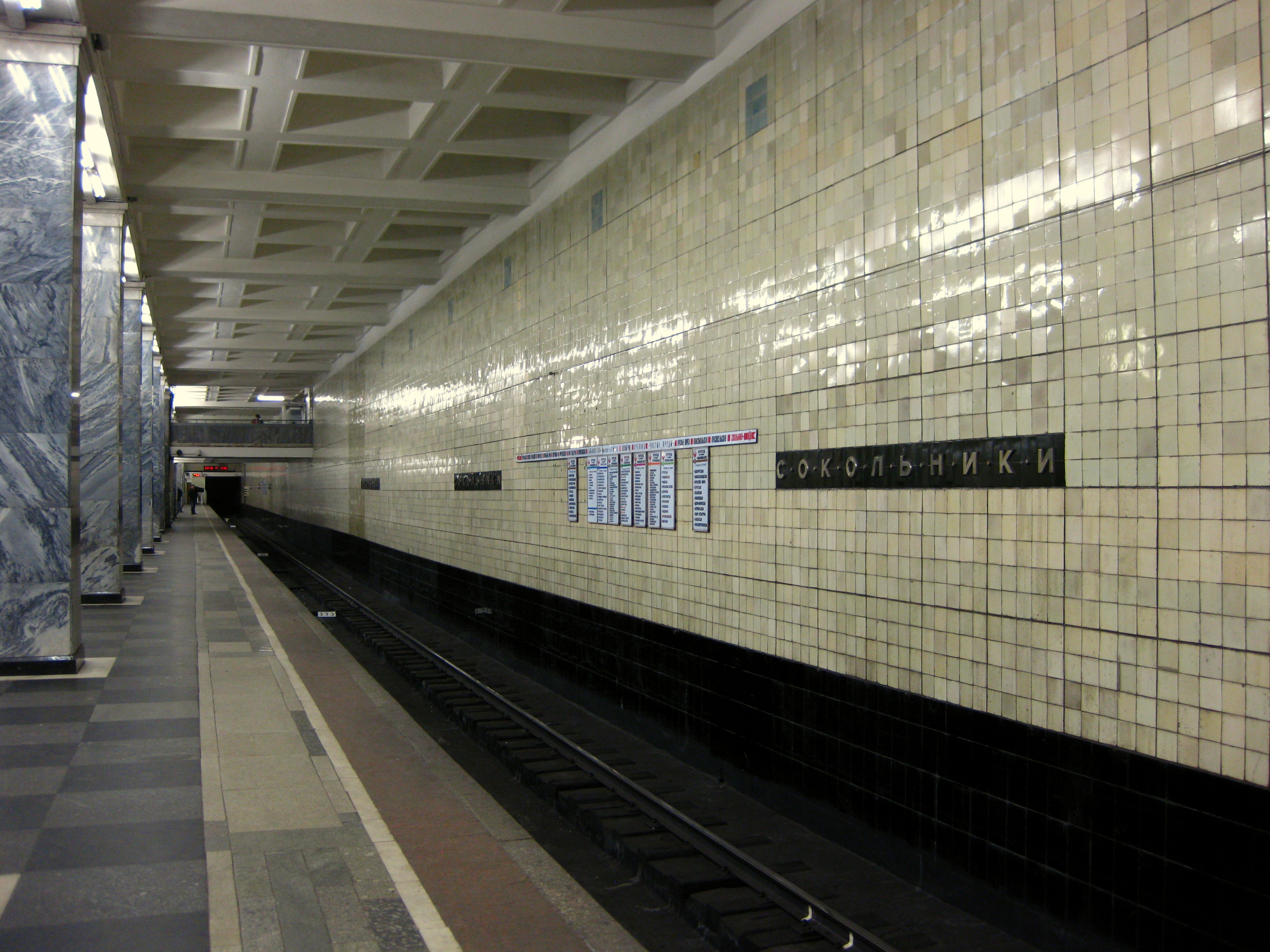
Station platform of Sokolniki

Sokolniki was the eastern terminus of the line for 30 years until the 1965 extension to Preobrazhenskaya Ploshchad was completed. The reversal sidings are still used for maintenance and overnight storage of trains.

== Design ==
Stereo image
Left frame
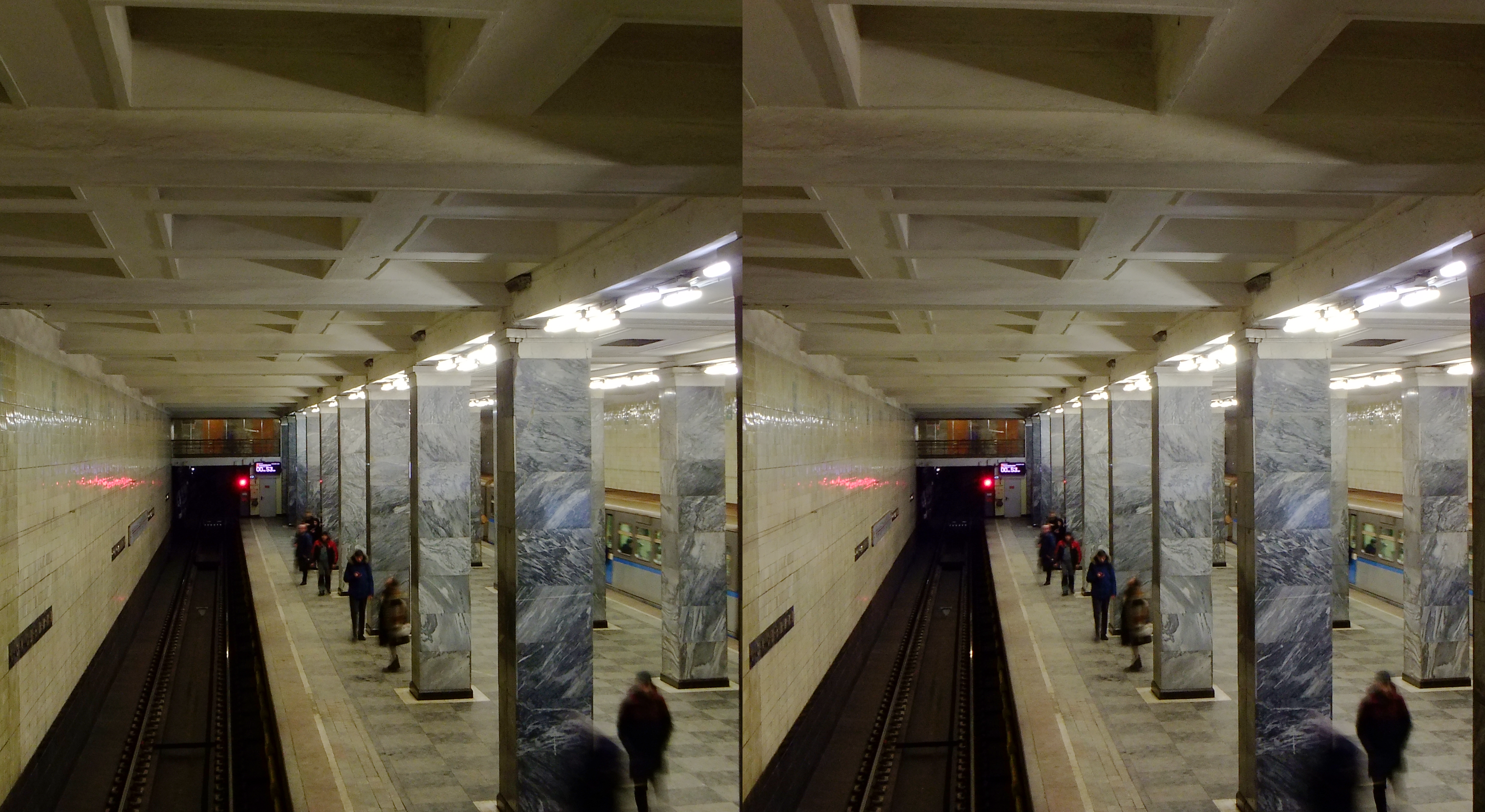
Right frame
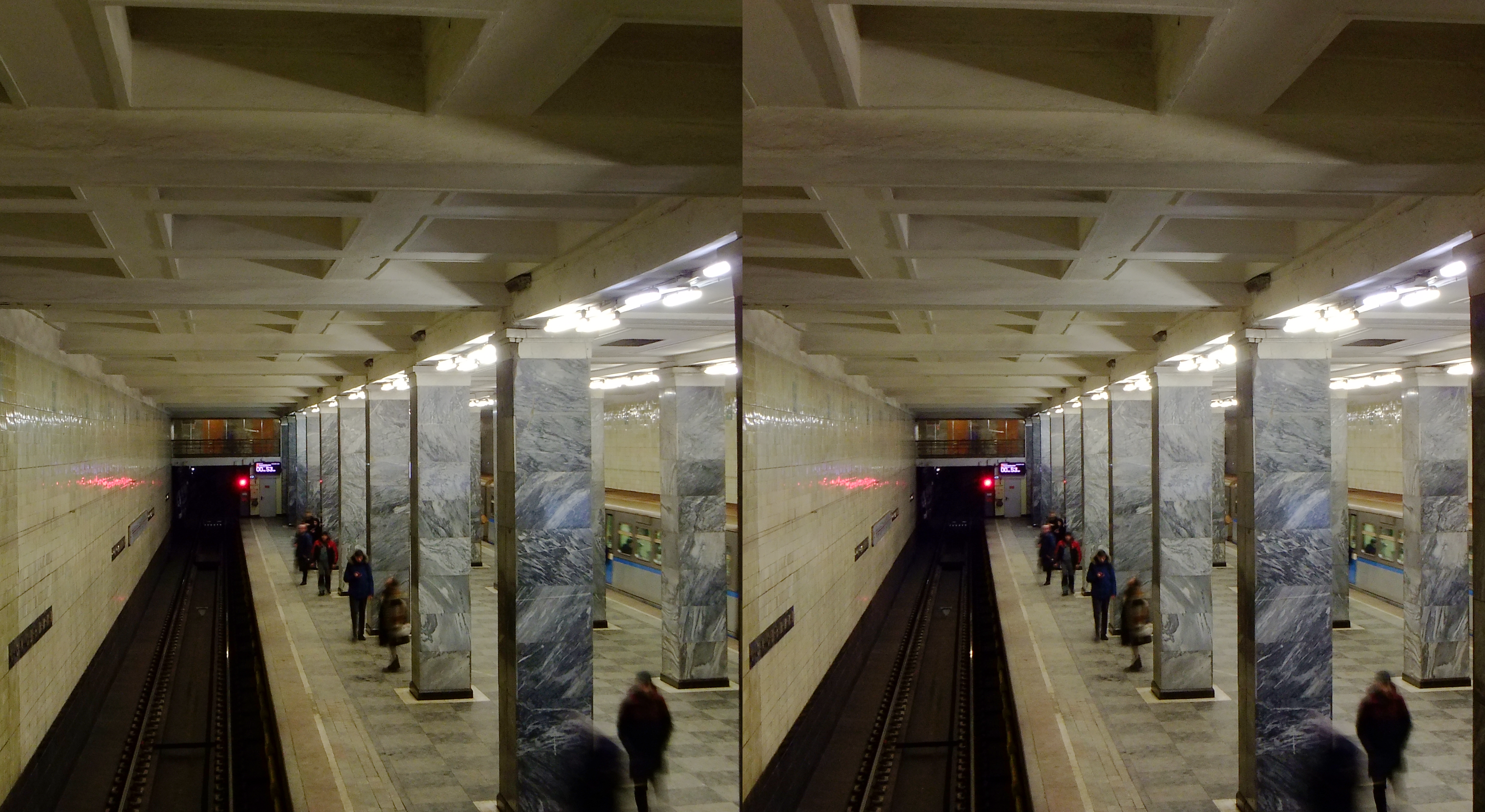
Parallel view
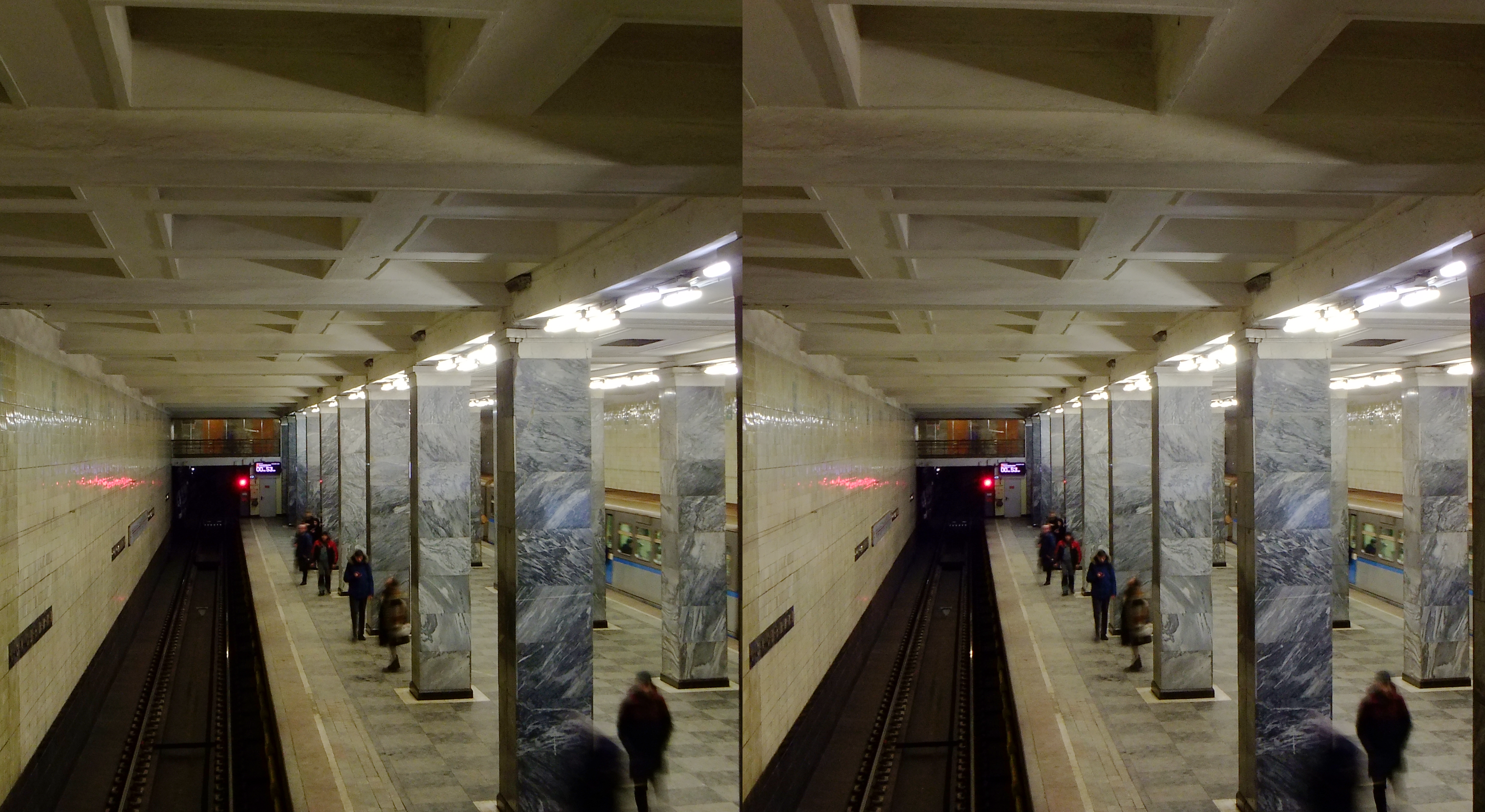
Cross-eye view
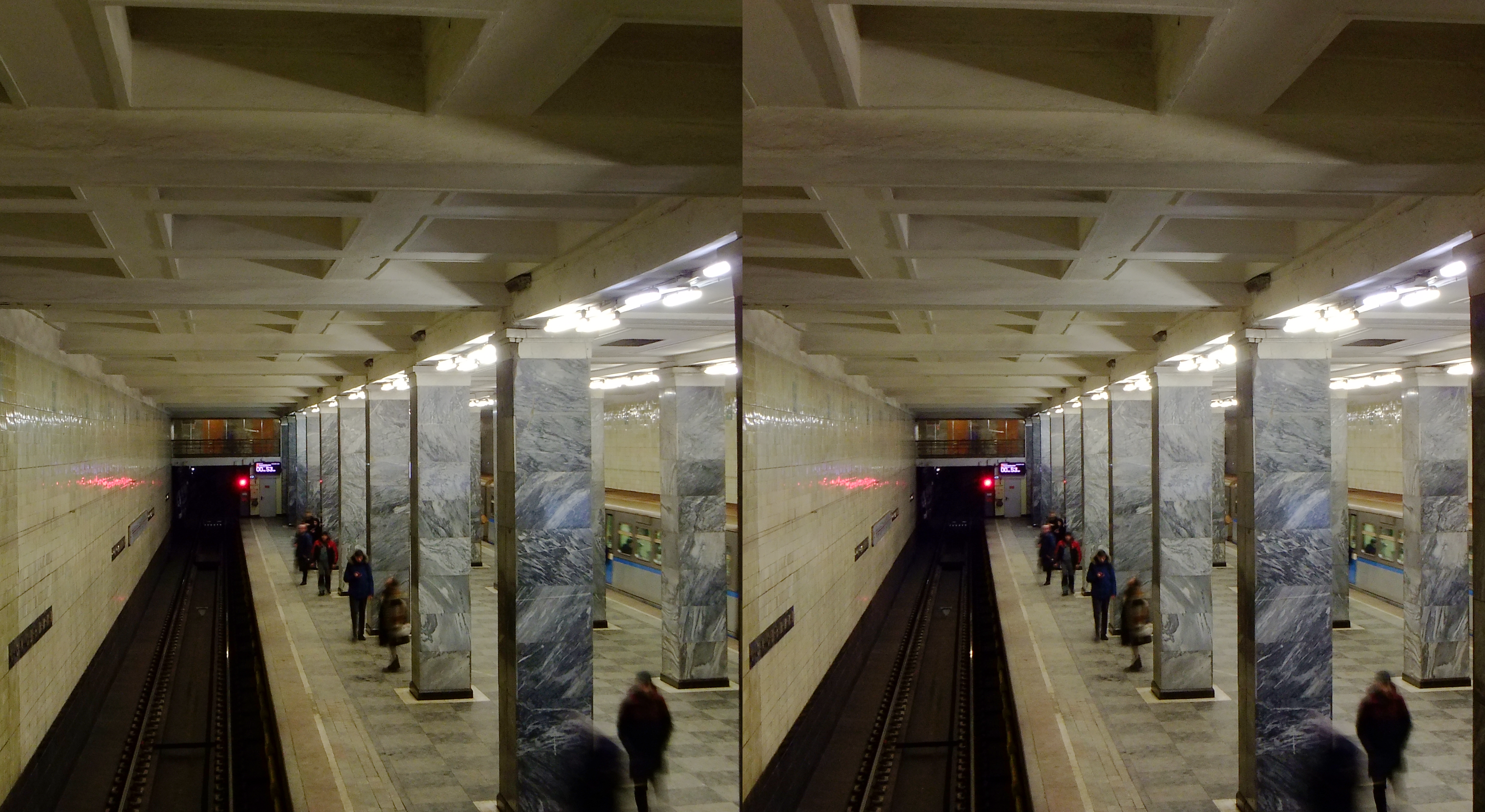

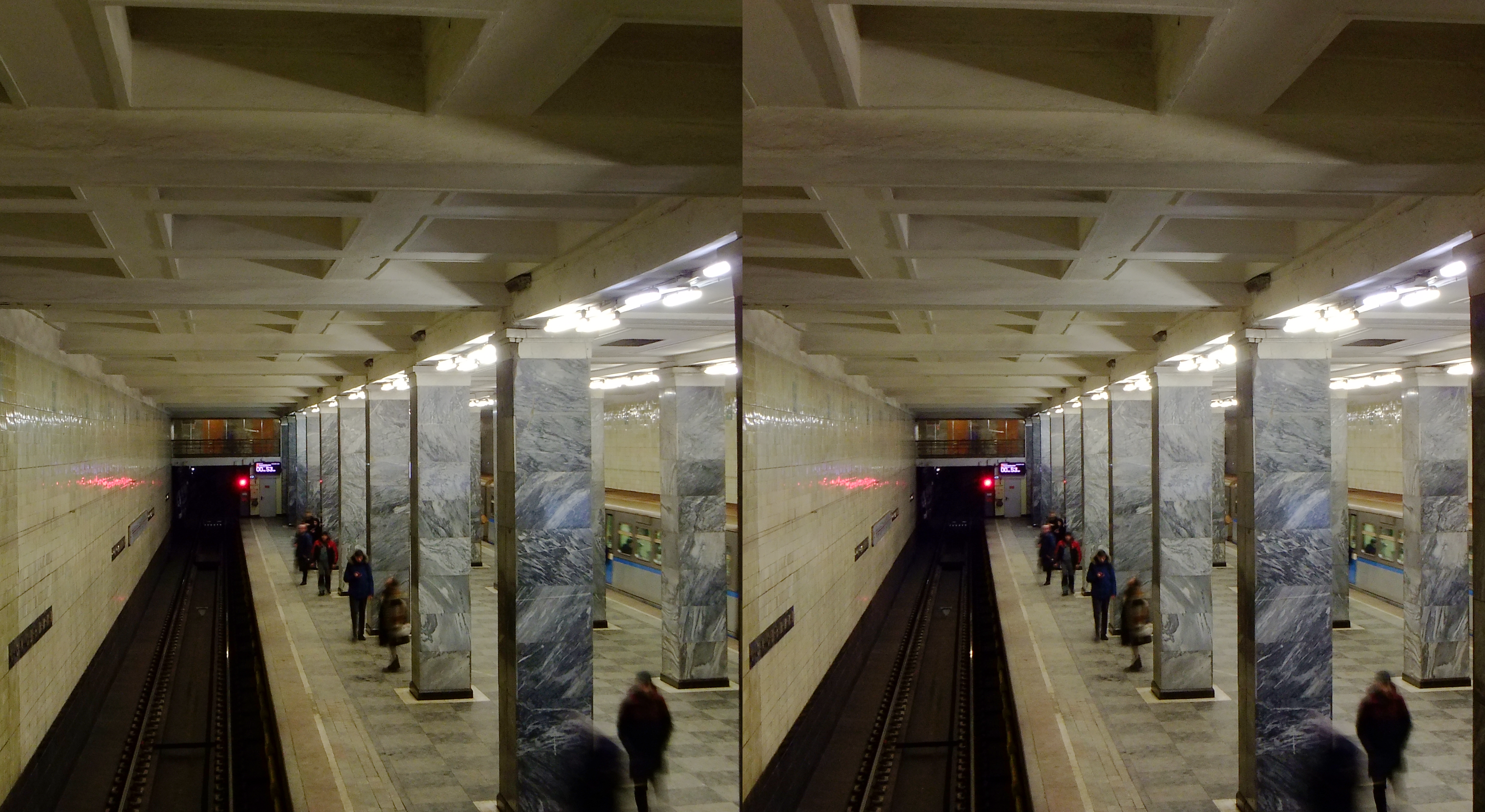
- Central hall of Sokolniki station.

The station was designed by architects Ivan Taranov and Nadezhda Bykova and features tiled walls and pillars faced with grey-blue Ufaley marble. A model of the station was awarded a Grand Prix at the 1937 Paris World's Fair.
