= Maryina Roshcha (Bolshaya Koltsevaya line) =

Metro station in Moscow, Russia

Maryina Roshcha Марьина Роща
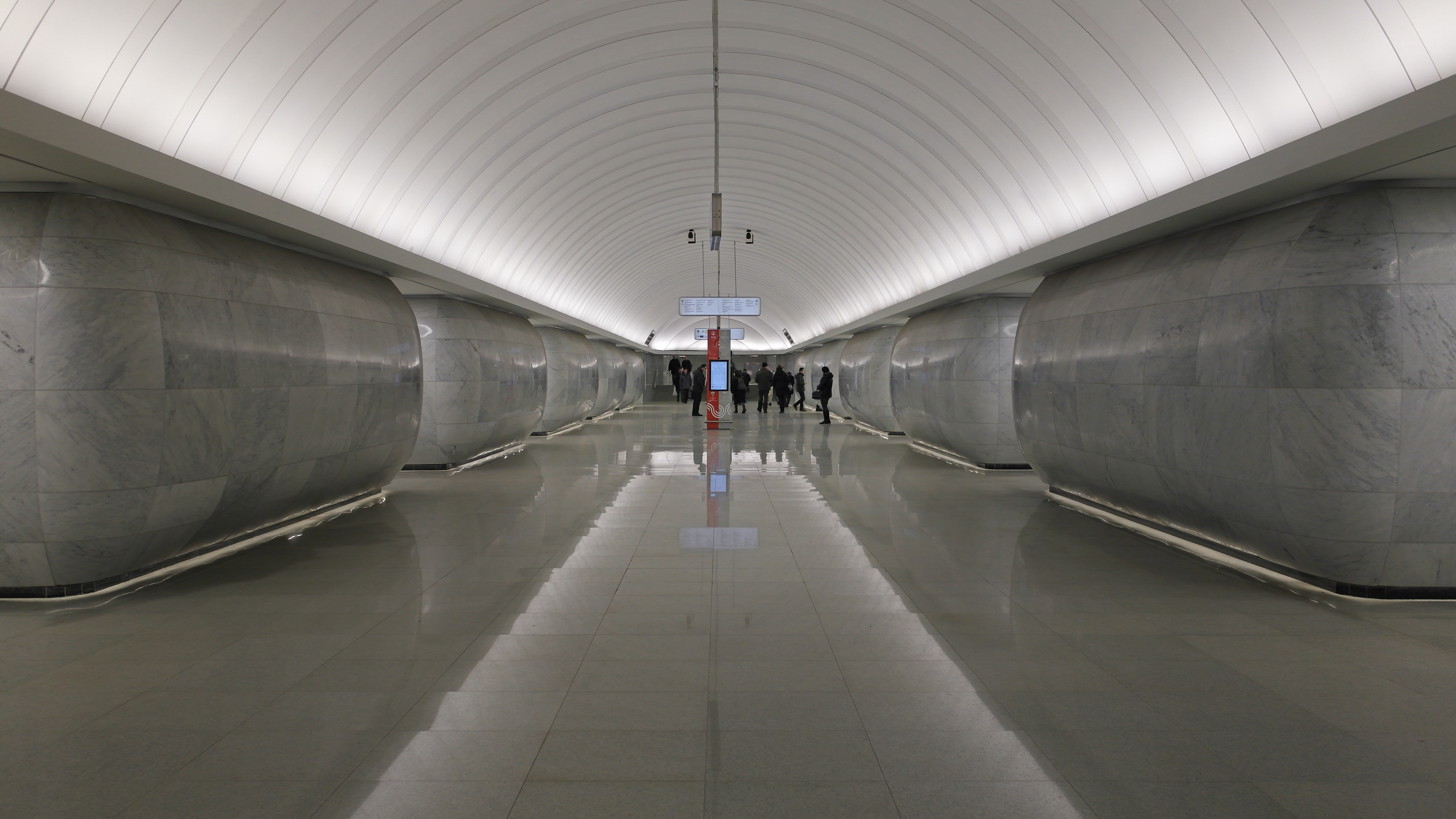

General information
- Location: Maryina Roshcha District; North-Eastern Administrative Okrug; Moscow; Russia
- Coordinates: 55.798°N 37.618°E
- Line: Bolshaya Koltsevaya line
- Connections: Railway: at Maryina Roshcha railway station

Construction
- Depth: 72 m (236 ft)
- Architect: Ivan Kolmanok, Alexander Tomashenko (AI-Architects)

History
- Opened: 1 March 2023 (3 years ago)

Services
Preceding station	Moscow Metro	Following station
Savyolovskaya anticlockwise / outer	Bolshaya Koltsevaya line	Rizhskaya clockwise / inner
Butyrskaya towards Fiztekh	Lyublinsko-Dmitrovskaya line transfer at Maryina Roshcha	Dostoevskaya towards Zyablikovo
Route map
Location
- Location within Moscow Metro

Maryina Roshcha (Russian: Марьина Роща) (Note: The station had also been named "Sheremetyevskaya" prior to its opening.) is a station on the Bolshaya Koltsevaya line of the Moscow Metro, in the Maryina Roshcha District, between the station Savyolovskaya and station Rizhskaya. A transfer to the Lyublinsko–Dmitrovskaya line, via its Maryina Roshcha station, is planned. The construction of a new railway station is also planned to allow for transfers to Line D2 of the Moscow Central Diameters.

Upon its opening, Maryina Roshcha will become the second-deepest station in the Moscow Metro, after Park Pobedy. At a depth of 72 m (236 ft) underground, Maryina Roshcha has four 130 m (430 ft) escalators, the longest escalators in Moscow. (Note: Park Pobedy is deeper at 84 m (276 ft) underground, but it has shorter escalators, at 127 m (417 ft) long.)

== History ==
Maryina Roshcha is one of 31 metro stations on the Bolshaya Koltsevaya line ('large circle line'), which, with 70 km (43 mi) of track, is scheduled to become what Moscow Metro calls the largest circular metro line in the world upon its opening in 2023. (Note: Moscow Metro stated that the completed Bolshaya Koltsevaya line would be longer than Line 10 of the Beijing Subway.) The line was first conceived in 1985, with construction on the line beginning in 2011.

General contractor Mosinzhproekt held an international contest to determine the architectural design of the station, with the citizens of Moscow voting in 2017 to determine the winner amongst the finalists. The winning design, by AI Architects, focuses on porcelain and rounded shapes.

The station is one of 14 Moscow Metro stations scheduled to open in 2023. (Note: Of the 14 stations, 9 are on the Bolshaya Koltsevaya line.) Maryina Roshcha's technical launch was held on 30 November 2022, along with those of Sokolniki and Rizhskaya, as part of the deployment of the new northeast section of the Bolshaya Koltsevaya line.

== Gallery ==
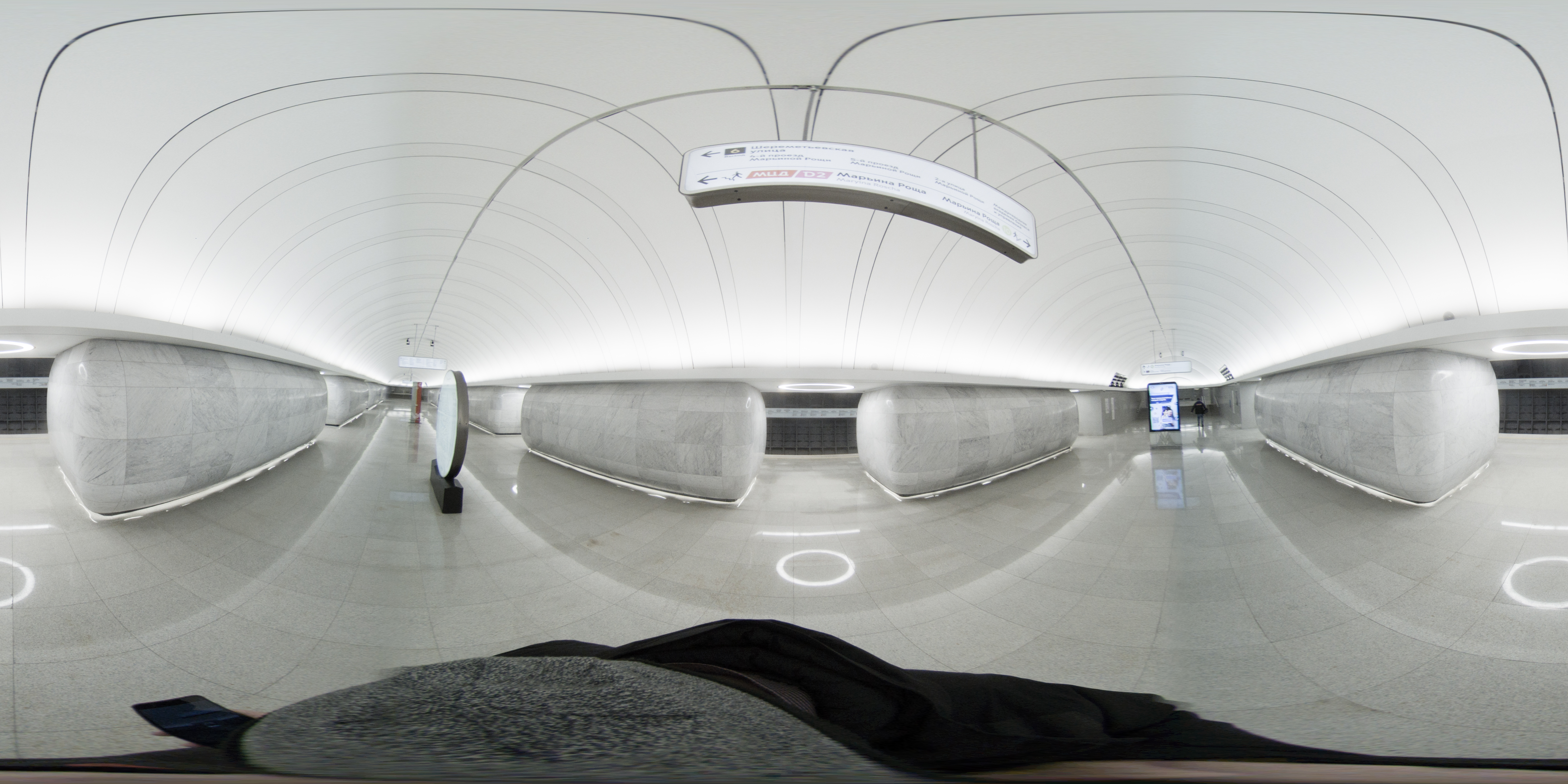
Station main hall (view as a 360° interactive panorama)

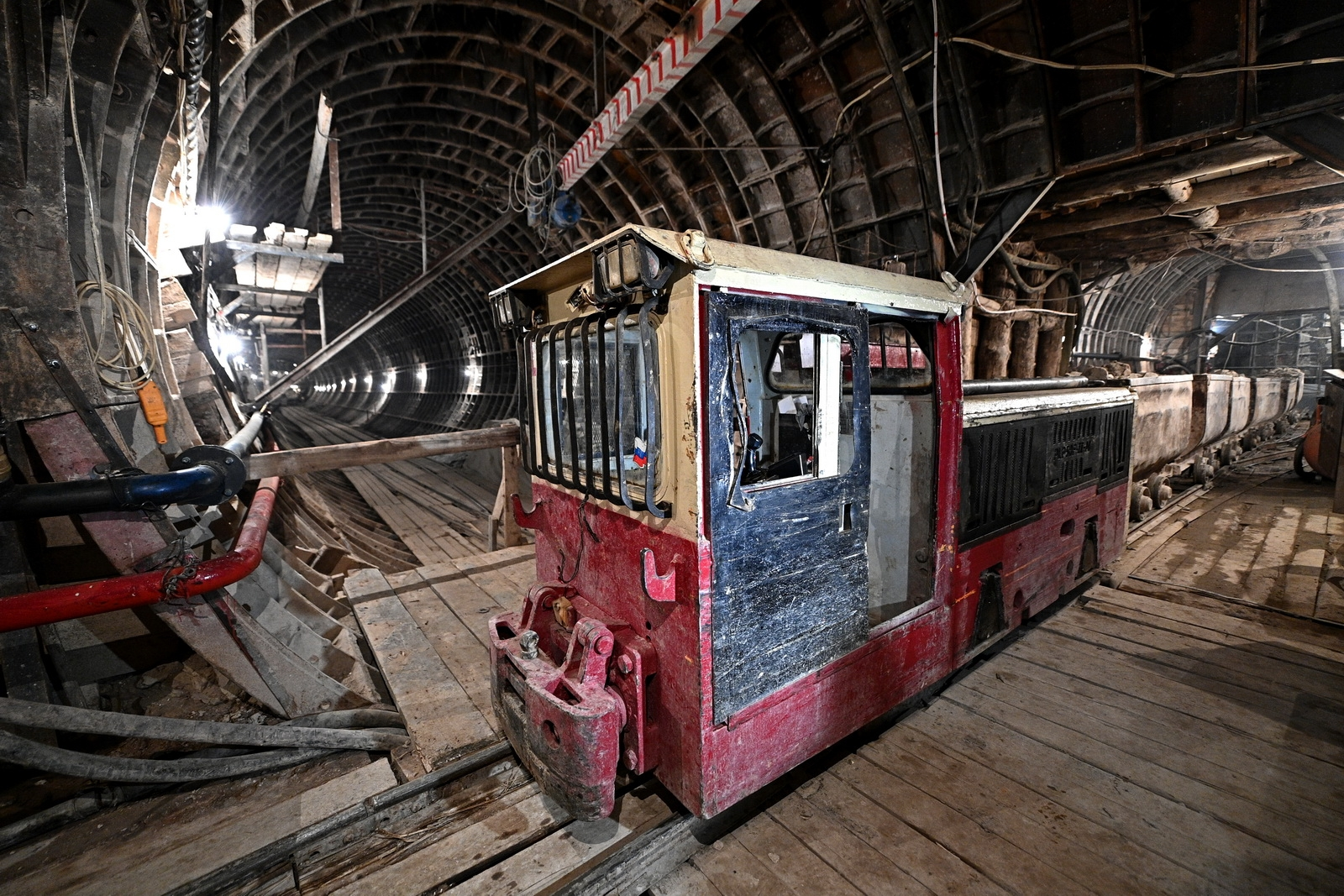
Tunnels under construction, 2021

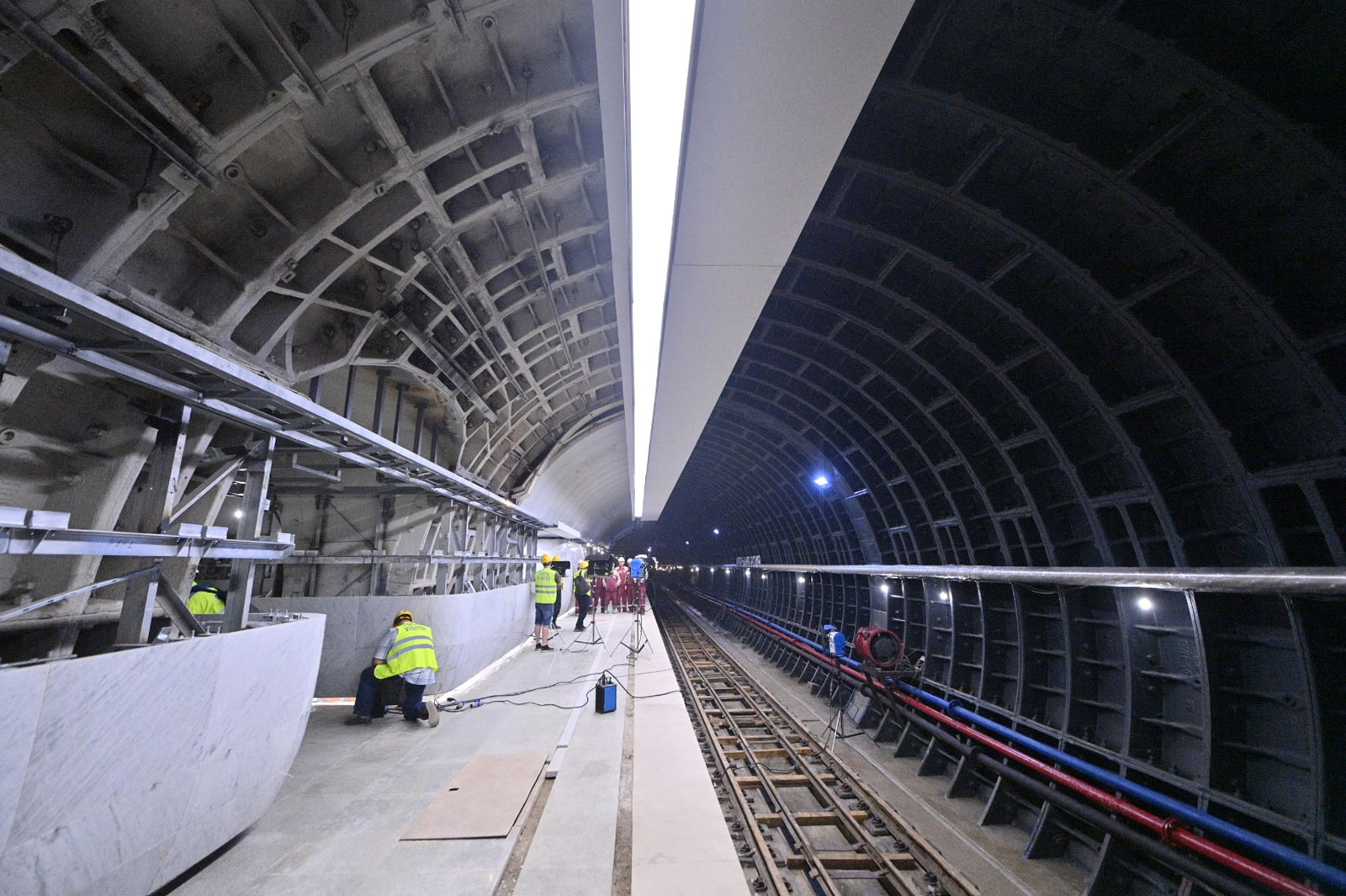
Platform under construction, 2022
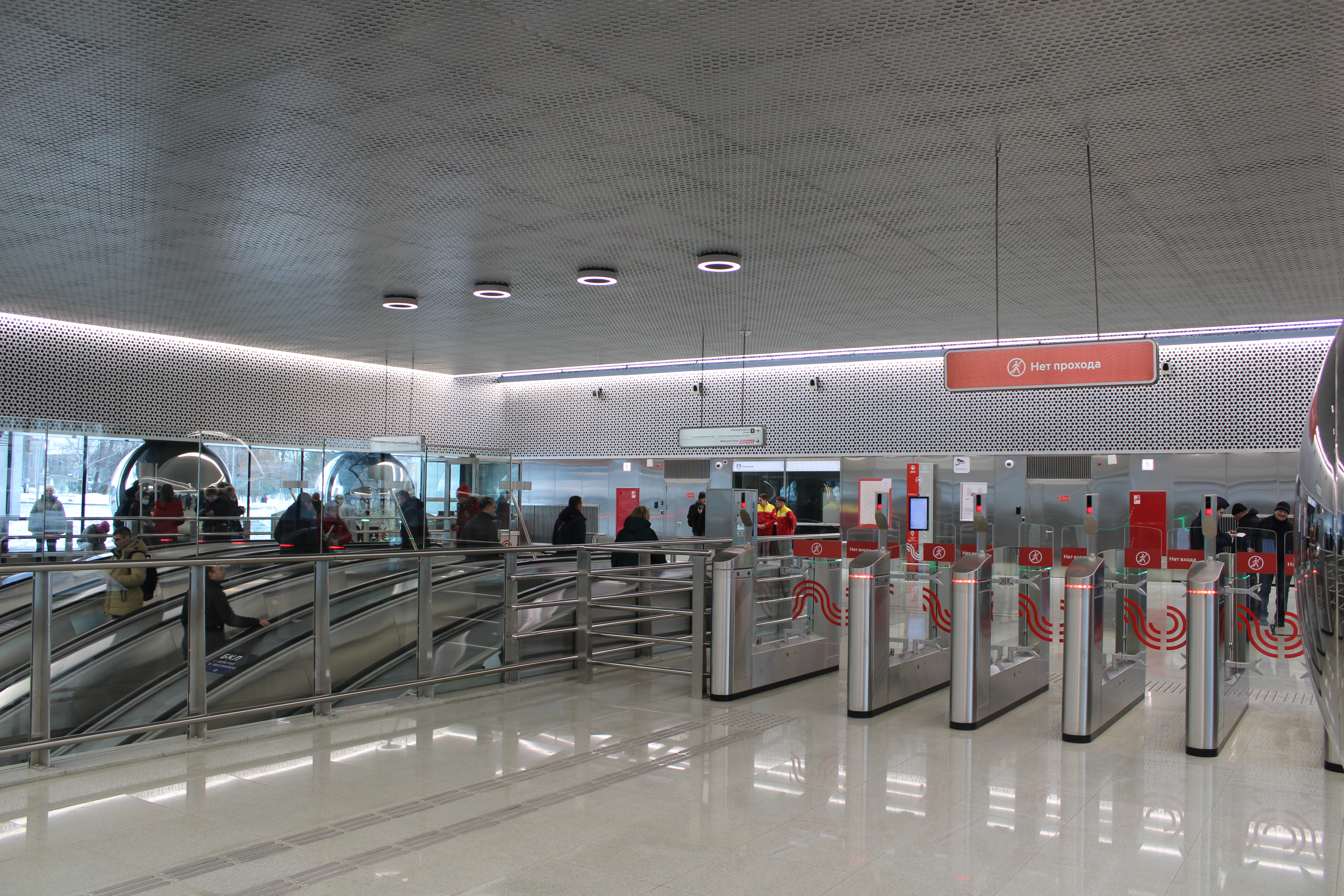
Lobby, fare gates, and escalators

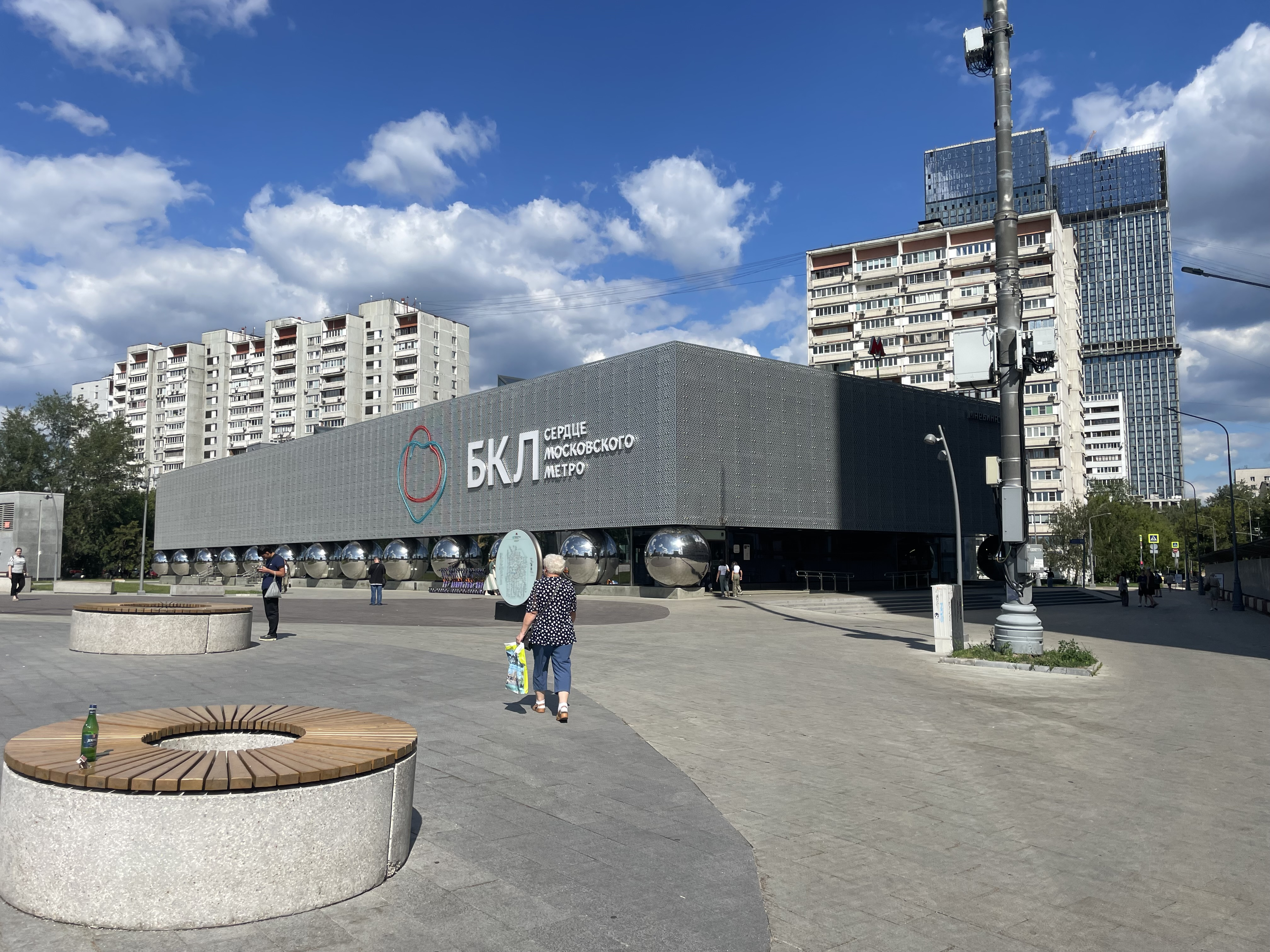
Vestibule of the metro station

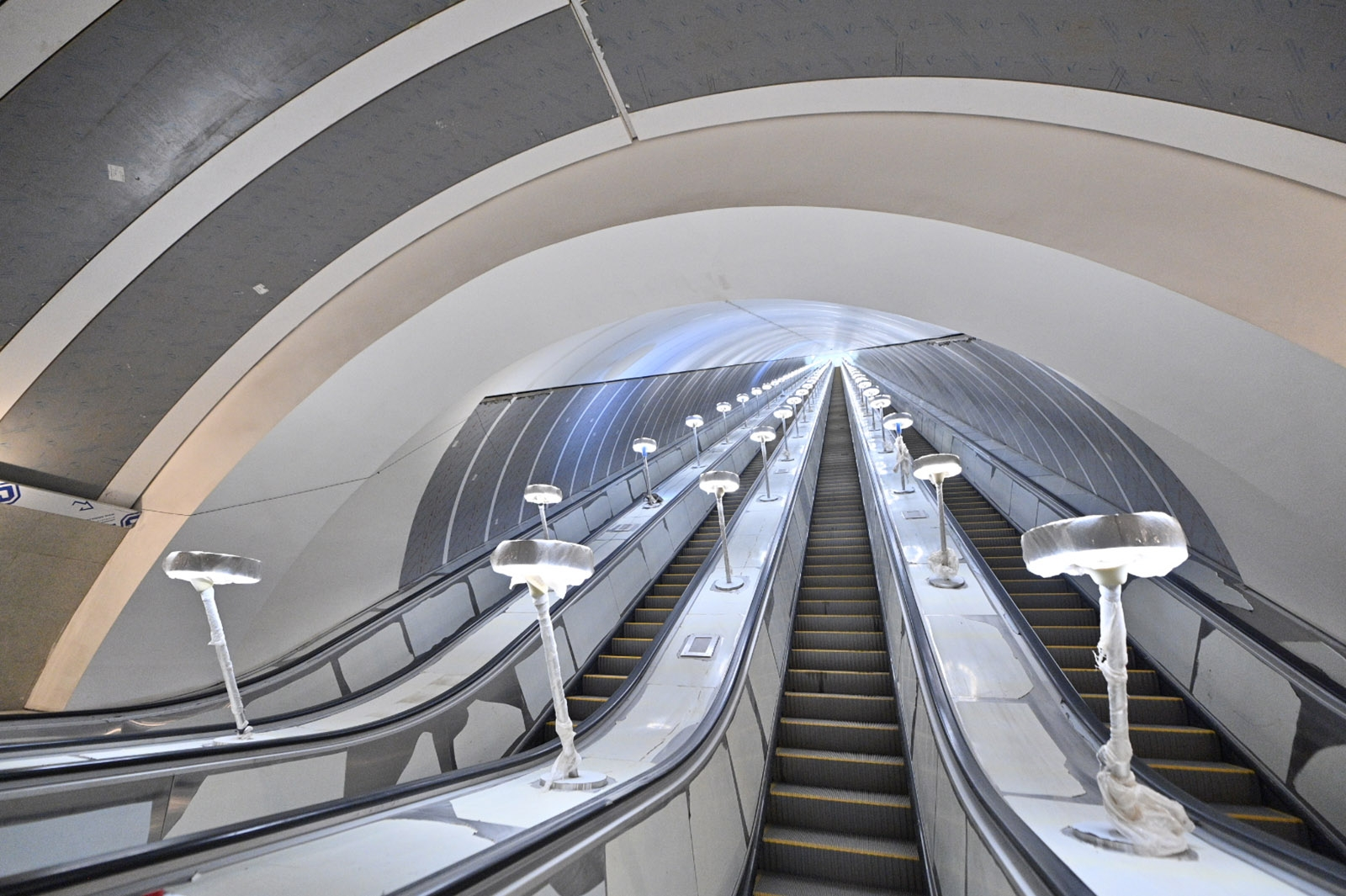
Bottom of the escalators
