= Komsomolskaya (Sokolnicheskaya line) =

Moscow Metro station

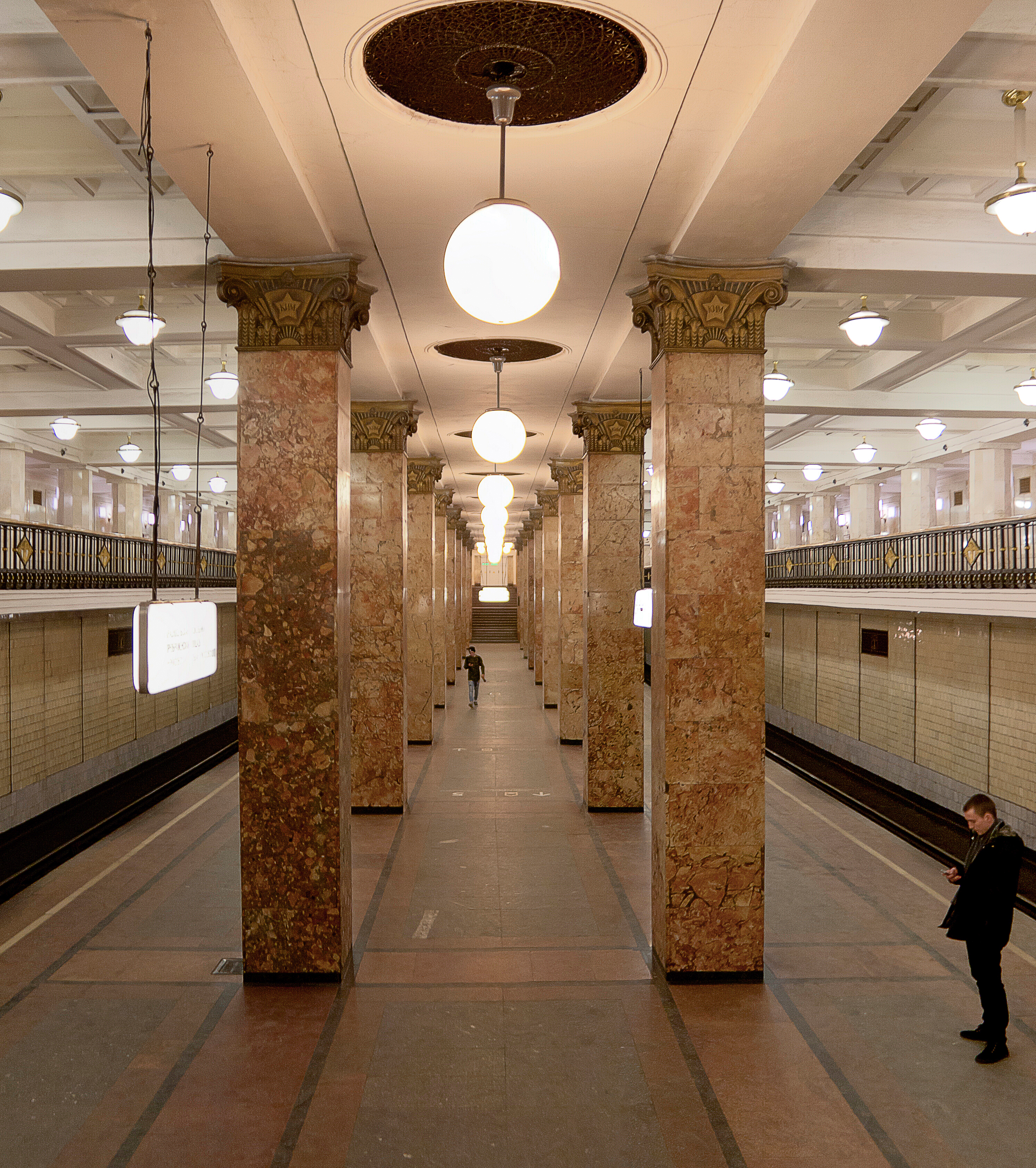

General information
- Location: Komsomolskaya Square; Krasnoselsky District; Central Administrative Okrug; Moscow; Russia
- Coordinates: 55.7753°N 37.6562°E
- System: Moscow Metro station
- Owner: Moskovsky Metropoliten
- Line: Sokolnicheskaya line
- Platforms: 1 island platform
- Tracks: 2
- Connections: Leningradsky railway station Yaroslavsky railway station Kazansky railway station Tram: 7, 13, 37, 50; Bus: A, т14, т41, 40, 122; Trolleybus: T

Construction
- Structure type: Shallow column triple-span
- Depth: 8 metres (26 ft)
- Platform levels: 1
- Parking: No
- Cycle facilities: No

Other information
- Station code: 006

History
- Opened: 15 May 1935; 91 years ago

Passengers
- 2009: 24,049,485

Services
Preceding station	Moscow Metro	Following station
Krasnye Vorota towards Potapovo	Sokolnicheskaya line	Krasnoselskaya towards Bulvar Rokossovskogo
Prospekt Mira anticlockwise / outer	Koltsevaya line transfer at Komsomolskaya	Kurskaya clockwise / inner
Route map
Location
- Location within Central Moscow

Komsomolskaya (Russian: Комсомо́льская) is a Moscow Metro station in the Krasnoselsky District, Central Administrative Okrug, Moscow. It is on the Sokolnicheskaya line, between Krasnye Vorota and Krasnoselskaya stations. It is located under Komsomolskaya Square, between the Leningradsky, Yaroslavsky, and Kazansky railway terminals. The station was named for the workers of the Komsomol youth league who helped to construct the first Metro line. It has a transfer at its namesake on the Koltsevaya line.

== History ==
Komsomolskaya was built using the cut and cover method, with construction beginning on 3 May 1933. Temporary bridges were built over the construction site to avoid disrupting traffic, especially the numerous tram routes in the area. To counteract the high water table, the station was built on 636 piles which were driven into the saturated soil.

Heavy rains in the summer of 1934 threatened the construction site several times, and at one point even the Kazansky terminal was in danger of collapsing. Nevertheless, the concrete structure of the station was completed by August 26 and Komsomolskaya opened on schedule on May 15, 1935.

Due to Komsomolskaya's location under a major transit hub, the station was built with an unusual upper gallery above the platform to help handle rush crowds. The station has tall pillars faced with pinkish limestone and topped with bronze capitals displaying the emblem of the Komsomol league. The station was designed by Dmitry Chechulin, and a model of it was displayed at the 1937 Paris World's fair.

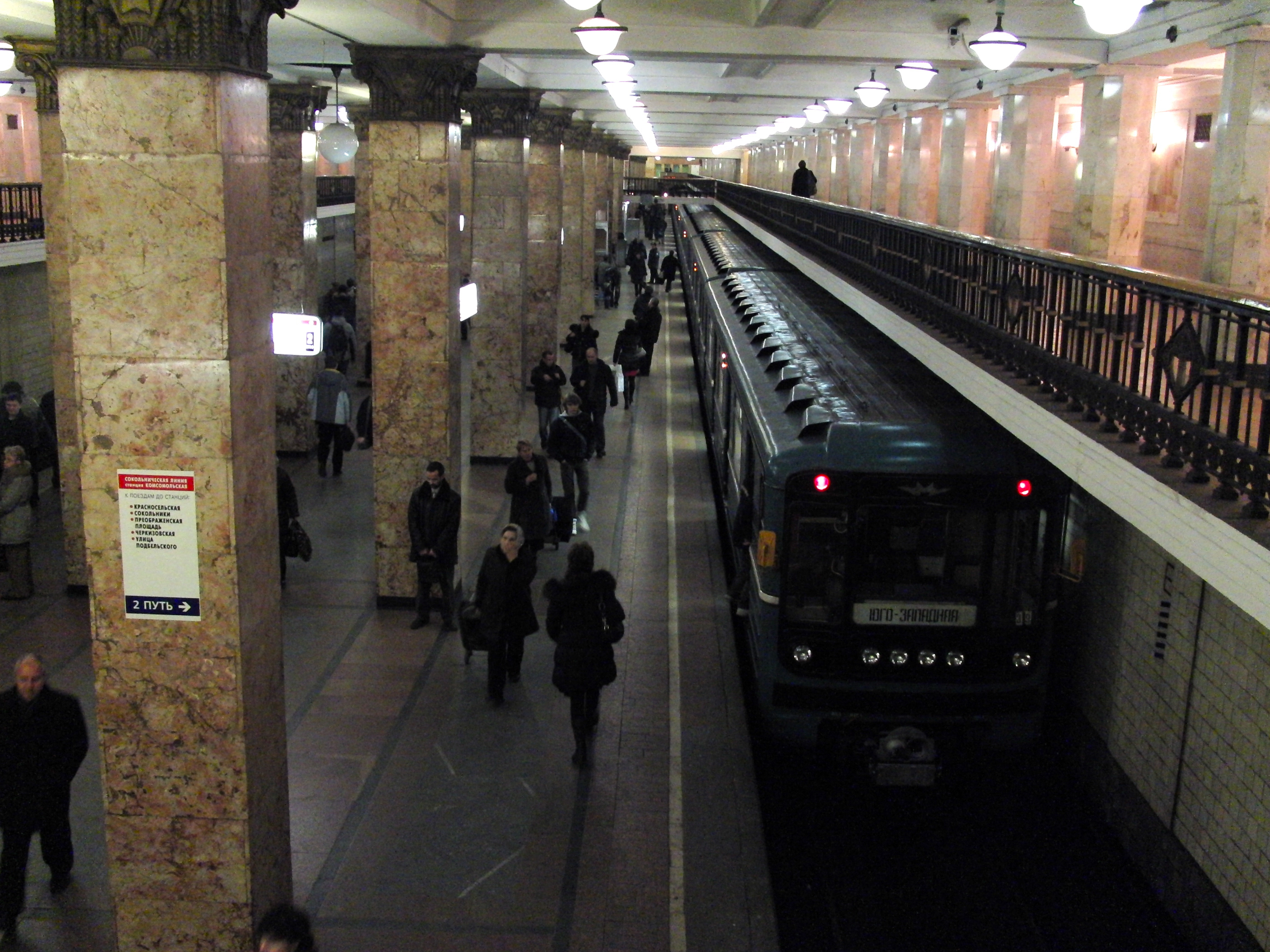
Station platform view with an 81-717/714

The station's southern entrance vestibule is built into the Kazansky Rail Terminal. The northern vestibule is on the opposite side of the square, between the Leningradsky and Yaroslavsky rail terminals. The latter entrance did not survive in its original form, having been replaced with a massive structure serving both this station and the Koltsevaya line station in 1952. There is a short branch line between Komsomolskaya and Krasnoselskaya stations, that leads to the Severnoe Depot. On 15 October 1934 the first Metro train left this depot for a trial run.

== Transfers ==
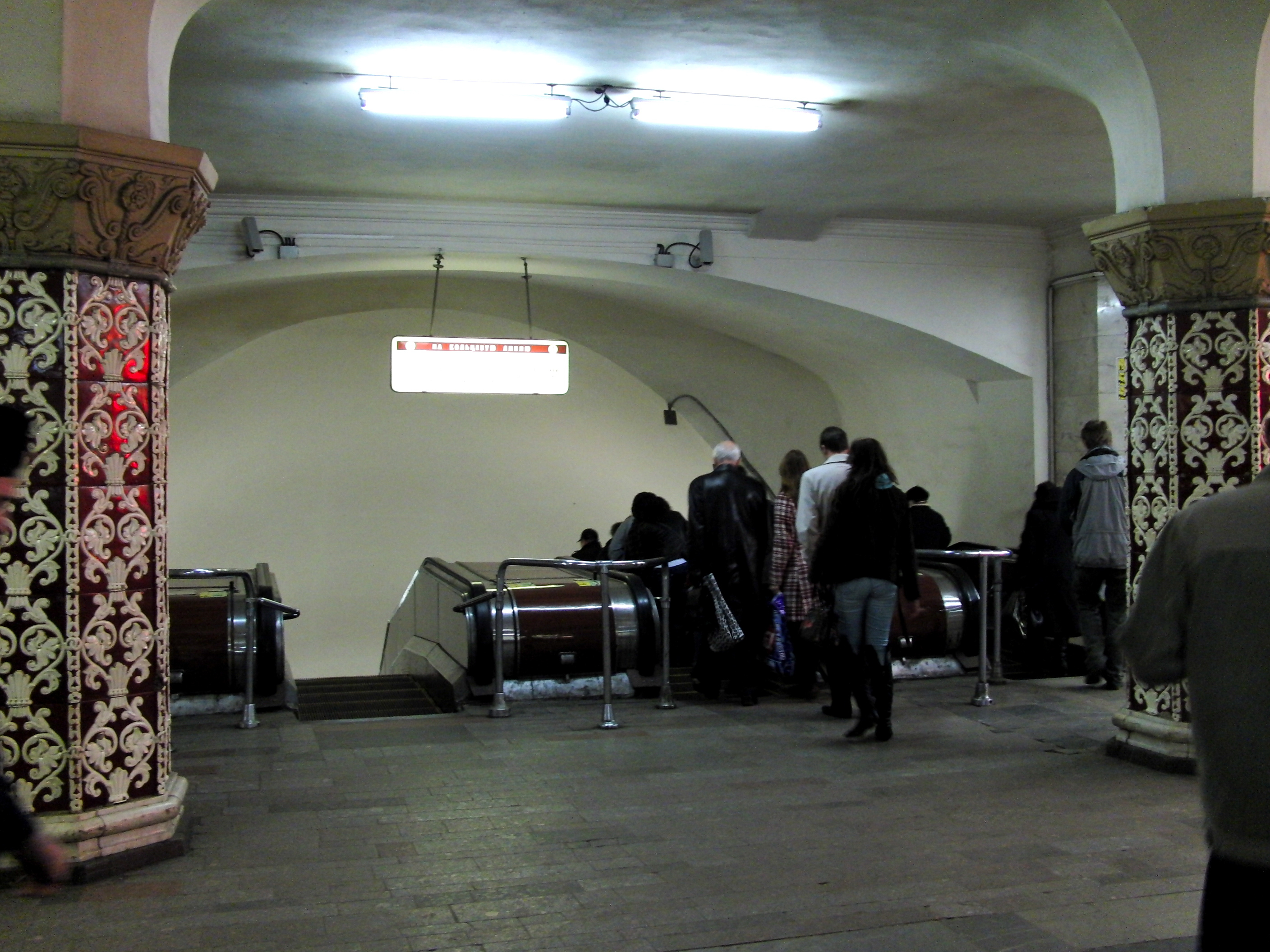
Escalators leading down to Komsomolskaya on the Koltsevaya line

From this station it is possible to transfer to Komsomolskaya on the Koltsevaya line.
