= Krasnoselskaya =

Moscow Metro station

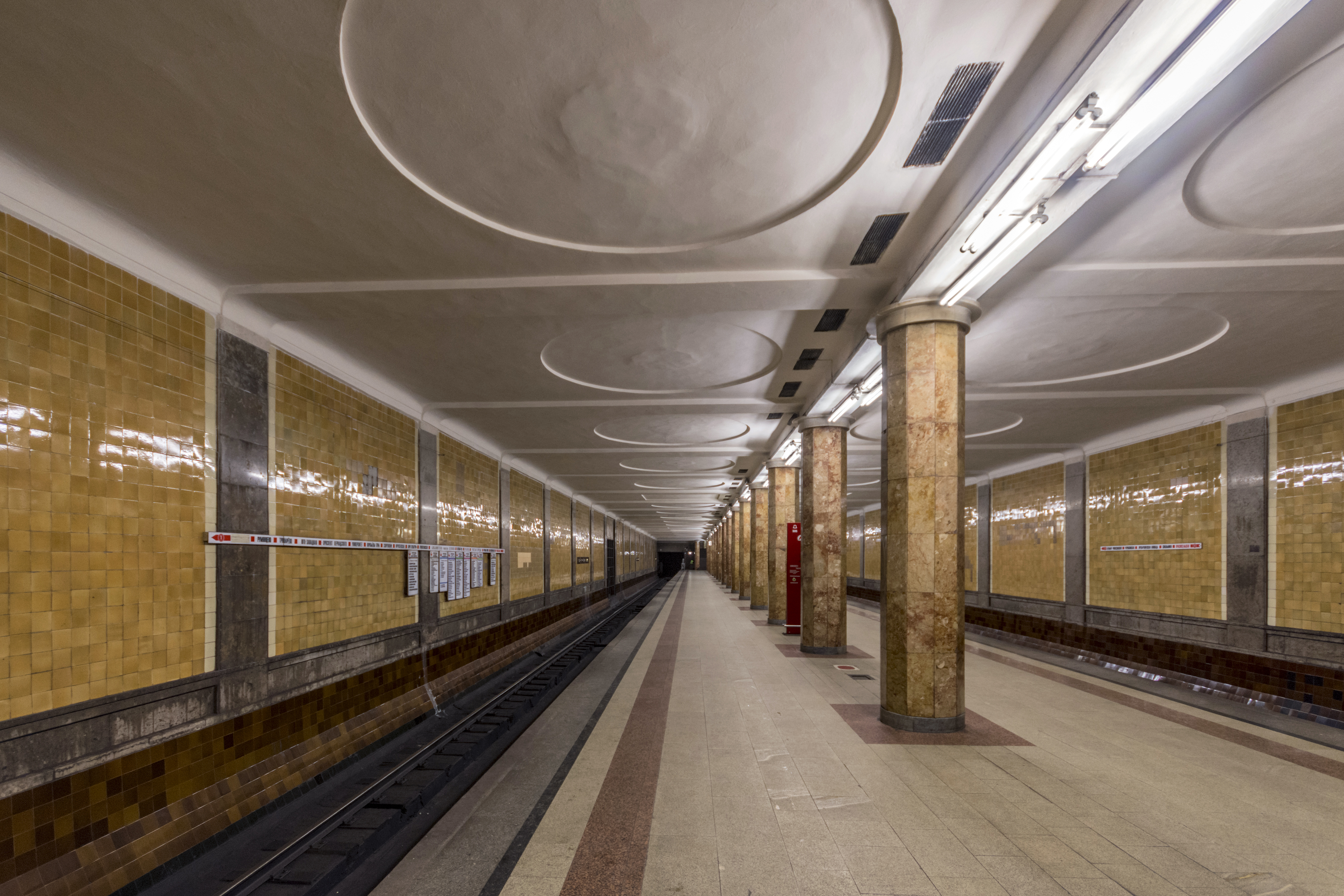

General information
- Location: Krasnoprudnaya street Krasnoselsky District; Central Administrative Okrug; Moscow; Russia
- Coordinates: 55.7801°N 37.6673°E
- System: Moscow Metro station
- Owner: Moskovsky Metropoliten
- Line: Sokolnicheskaya line
- Platforms: 1 island platform
- Tracks: 2
- Connections: Bus: 40, 122; Trolleybus: 14, 41; Tram: 7, 37, 45, 50

Construction
- Structure type: Shallow column double-vault
- Depth: 8 metres (26 ft)
- Platform levels: 1
- Parking: No
- Cycle facilities: No

Other information
- Station code: 005

History
- Opened: 15 May 1935; 91 years ago

Services
Preceding station	Moscow Metro	Following station
Komsomolskaya towards Potapovo	Sokolnicheskaya line	Sokolniki towards Bulvar Rokossovskogo
Route map
Location
- Location within Moscow Metro

Krasnoselskaya (Russian: Красносе́льская, lit. 'Red village') is a Moscow Metro station in the Krasnoselsky District, Central Administrative Okrug, Moscow. It is on the Sokolnicheskaya Line, between Komsomolskaya and Sokolniki stations. Krasnoselskaya is located under Krasnoprudnaya Street, east of the intersection with Krasnoselskaya Street.

== Name ==
It is named after Krasnoselskaya Street.

== History ==
The section of the Sokolnicheskaya Line between Sokolniki and Komsomolskaya was built under Krasnoprudnaya Street, using the cut and cover method. Construction work on Krasnoselskaya began in spring 1933, and the station opened along with other 9 stations of the line on 15 May 1935.

== Design ==
The planned passenger volume at Krasnoselskaya was relatively low, so the station was built with a narrower platform than the other stations of the first line. The station has one row of ten-sided columns, which are faced with red and yellow Crimean marble. The walls are finished with yellow and red ceramic tile and punctuated at regular intervals by concrete pilasters. The architects of the station were B. Vilenskiy and V. Yershov.

== Entrance ==
Krasnoselskaya was originally planned to have entrances at two ends, but only the western one, located at the northeast corner of Krasnoprudnaya Street and Upper Krasnoselskaya Street, was built. In 2005 the vestibule's original tile floor was replaced with similarly-coloured marble.
