= Sokolniki District =

Sokolniki District район Сокольники (Russian)
- District
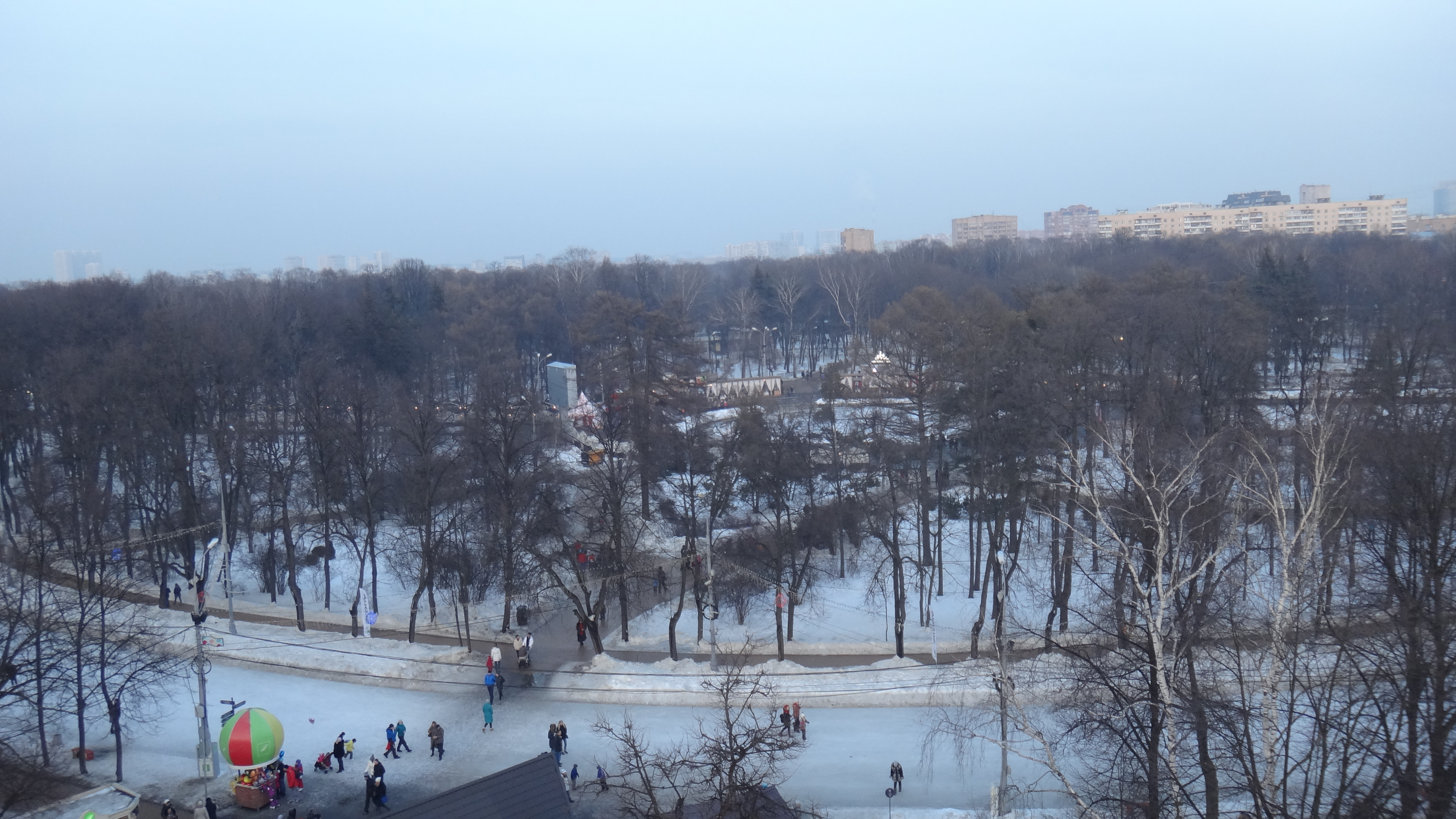
- Sokolniki Park

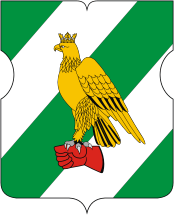
- Flag Coat of arms
- Location of Sokolniki District in Moscow
- Coordinates: 55°47′41″N 37°40′35″E
- Country: Russia
- Federal subject: Moscow

Population (2010 Census)
  - Total: 57,444
  - Urban: 100%
  - Rural: 0%
- Time zone: UTC+
- OKTMO ID: 45315000
- Website: http://sokolniki.mos.ru/

Sokolniki District (Russian: райо́н Соко́льники) is a district of the Eastern Administrative Okrug of the federal city of Moscow located in the north-east corner of the city. Population: 57,444 (2010 census); 54,975 (2002 census).

== Etymology ==
Sokolniki derives its name from the word "сокол" (sokol, meaning "falcon") in view of the Tsar's falcon hunting grounds which were located there, primarily on the territory of the present-day Sokolniki Park. The district also provides the name for one of its metro stations: Sokolniki Metro Station.

== Sports ==
The district is home to the FC and HC Spartak Moscow. The latter plays its games in the Sokolniki Sports Palace located within Sokolniki Park.

== Miscellaneous ==
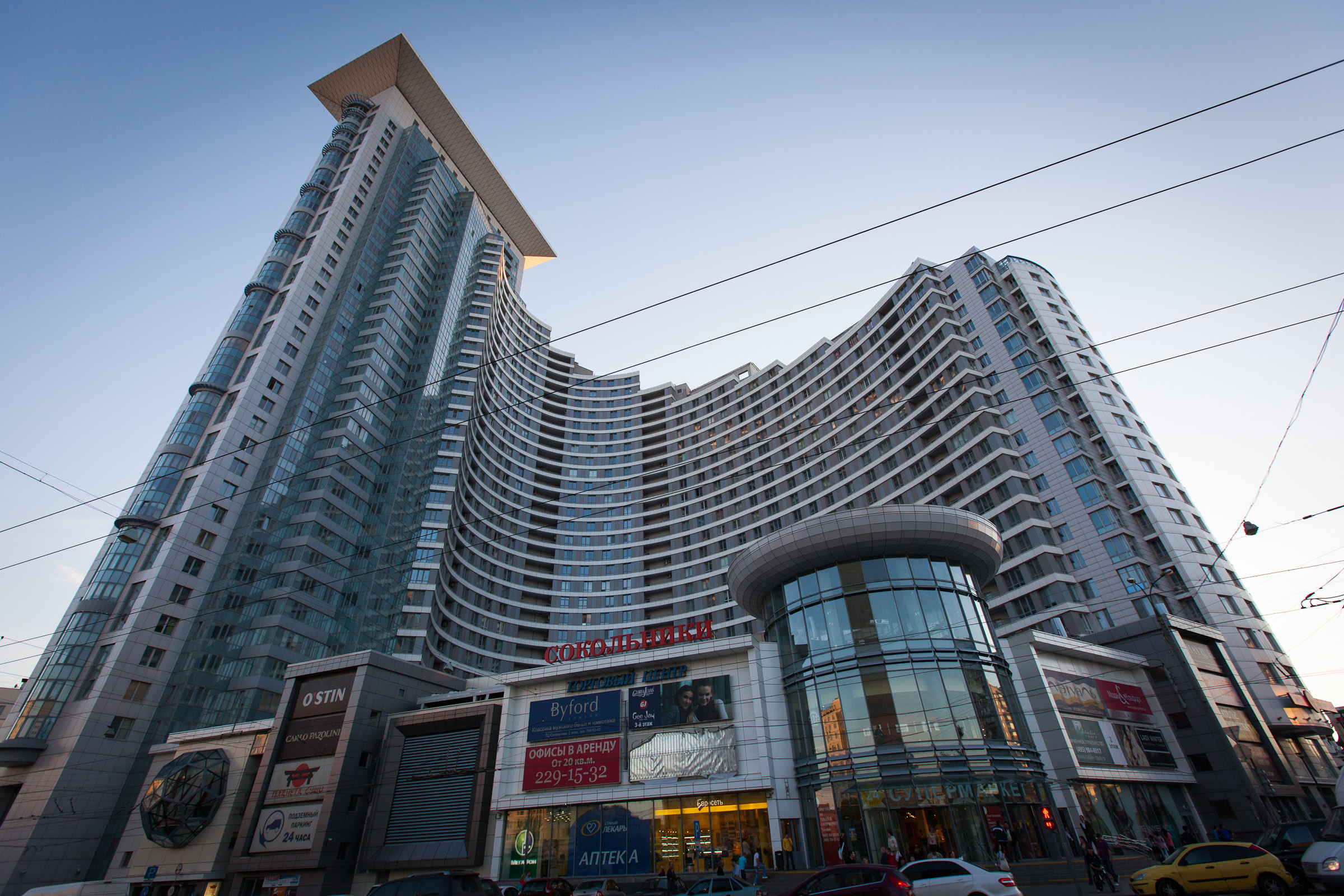
shopping center "Sokolniki"

In 2006, after twenty years of construction and changing ownership, a twenty-storey hotel finally opened overlooking the Sokolniki metro station and Sokolniki Square. This hotel is now the Holiday Inn Sokolniki.

In Tolstoy's War and Peace, Pierre fights a duel in Sokolniki.

The Elite House in Sokolniki will soon be one of the largest buildings in the world with DuPont Tyvek used as a weather and water barrier.
