= Rizhskaya (Bolshaya Koltsevaya line) =

Metro station in Moscow, Russia

Coordinates: 55.7925°N 37.6361°E

Rizhskaya Рижская
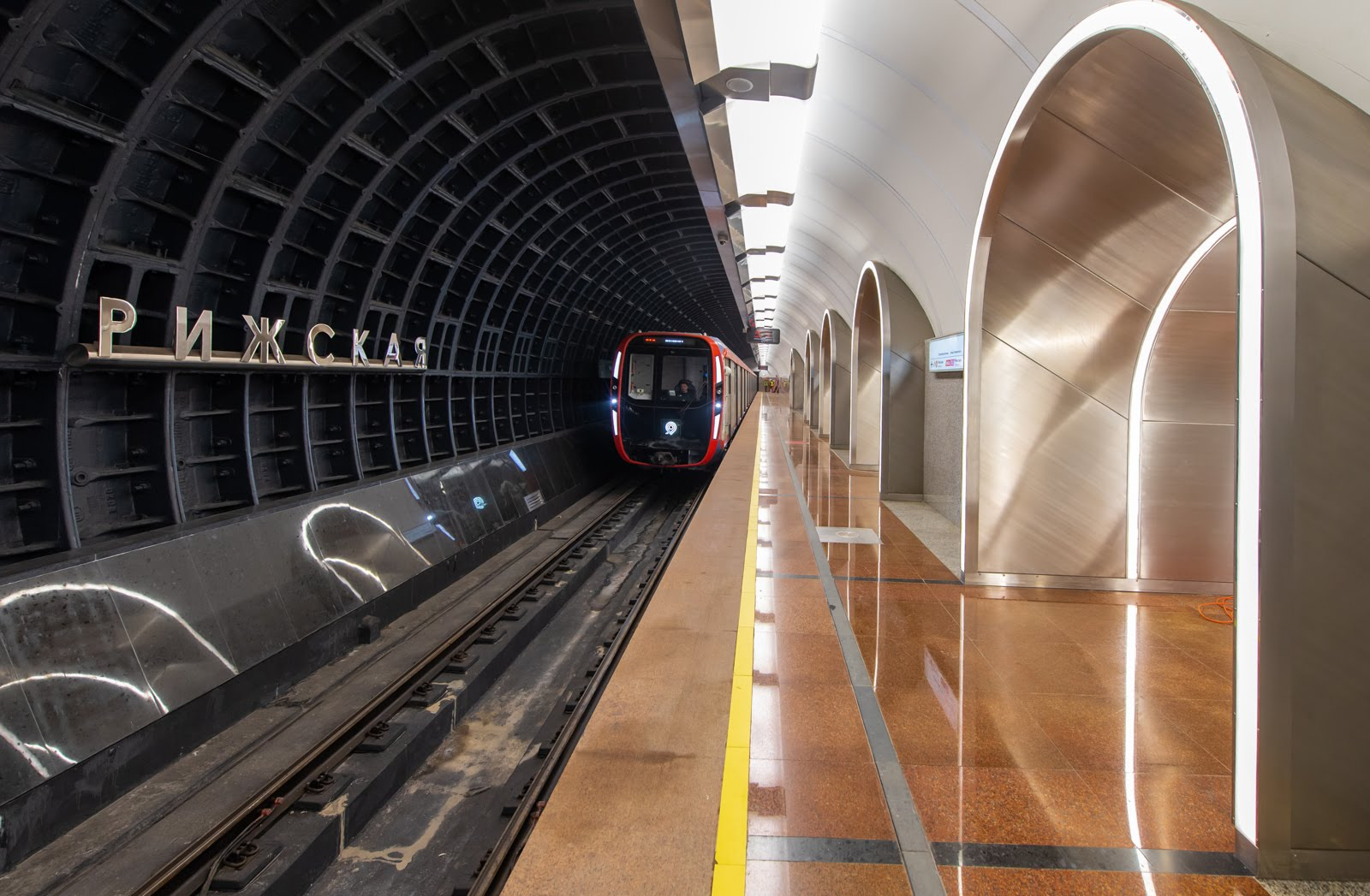
- Rizhskaya station view

General information
- Location: Russia
- Line: Bolshaya Koltsevaya line
- Tracks: 2
- Connections: Bus: м2, м9, 33, 265, с484, с510, 519, с538, 539, с585, 714, 778, 903, т14, т18, т42, н9

Construction
- Depth: 63.5 m (208 ft)

History
- Opened: 1 March 2023

Services
Preceding station	Moscow Metro	Following station
Maryina Roshcha anticlockwise / outer	Bolshaya Koltsevaya line	Sokolniki clockwise / inner
Prospekt Mira towards Novoyasenevskaya	Kaluzhsko-Rizhskaya line transfer at Rizhskaya	Alekseyevskaya towards Medvedkovo
Route map
Bolshaya Koltsevaya line
Location
- Location within Moscow Metro

Rizhskaya (Russian: Рижская) is a station on the Bolshaya Koltsevaya line of the Moscow Metro, between the stations Sokolniki and Maryina Roshcha. A transfer to the Kaluzhsko–Rizhskaya line, via its Rizhskaya station, is opened on the opening day, 1 March 2023. The two metro stations are being developed, along with the nearby Moscow Rizhsky railway station, as part of a transport interchange hub that would also serve three of the Moscow Central Diameters (D2, D3, and D4) as well as the Moscow–Saint Petersburg high-speed railway.

The station is one of 14 Moscow Metro stations that were opened on 1 March 2023. (Note: Of the 14 stations, 9 are on the Bolshaya Koltsevaya line.) Rizhskaya's technical launch was held on 30 November 2022, along with those of Sokolniki and Maryina Roshcha, as part of the deployment of the new northeast section of the Bolshaya Koltsevaya line.

== Gallery ==
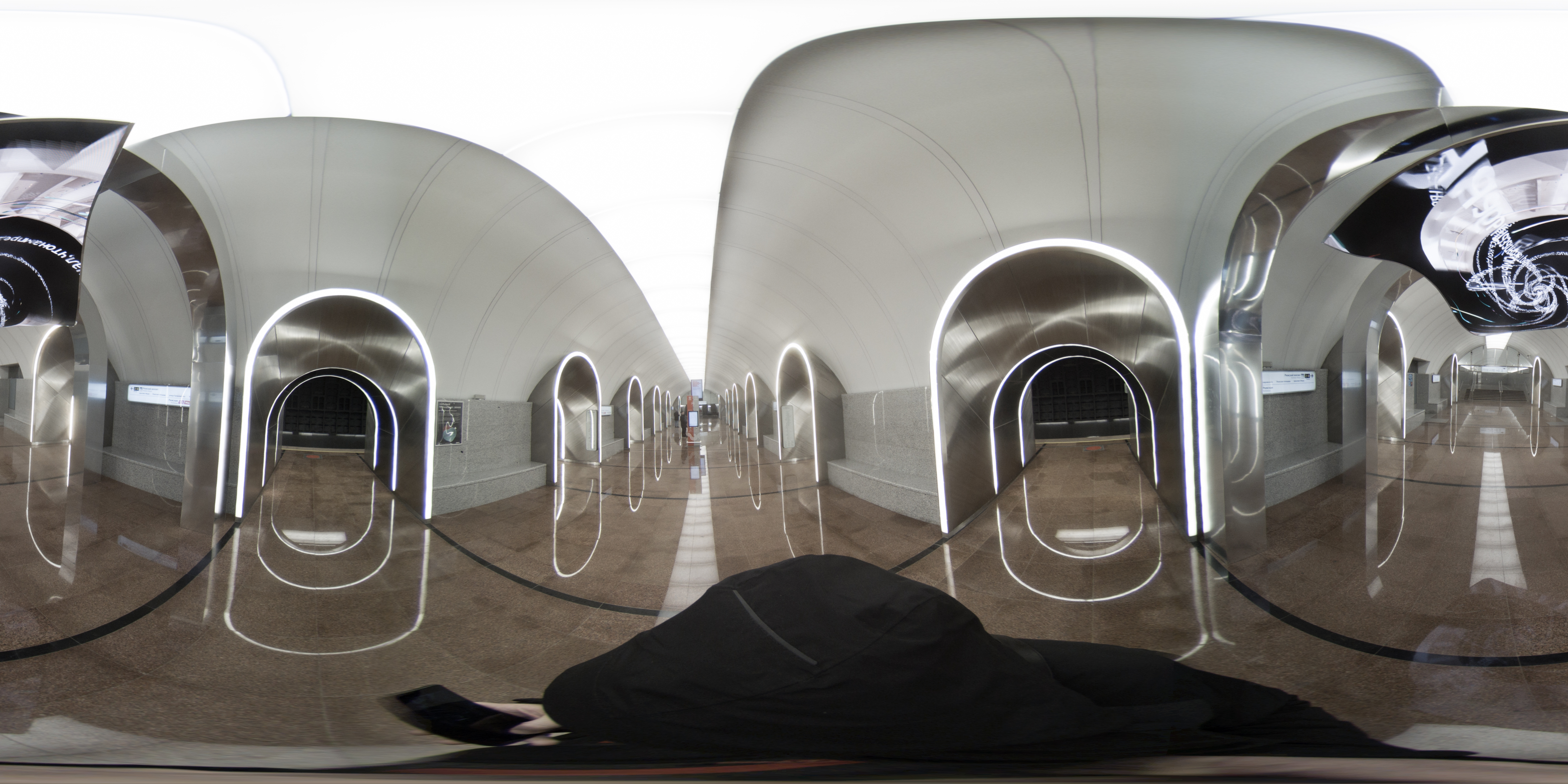
Station main hall with stairs to exit (view as a 360° interactive panorama)

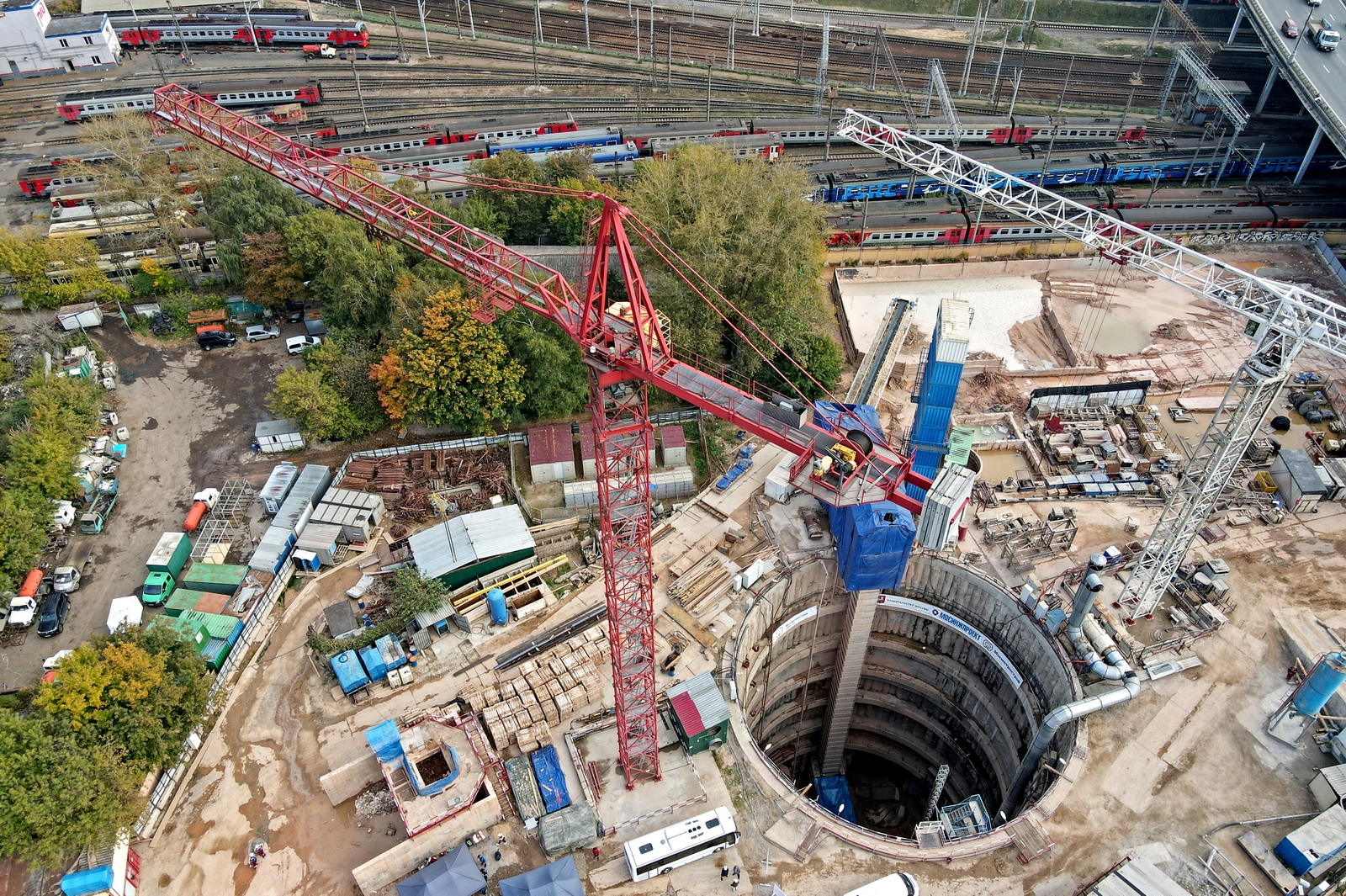
Construction site in 2020

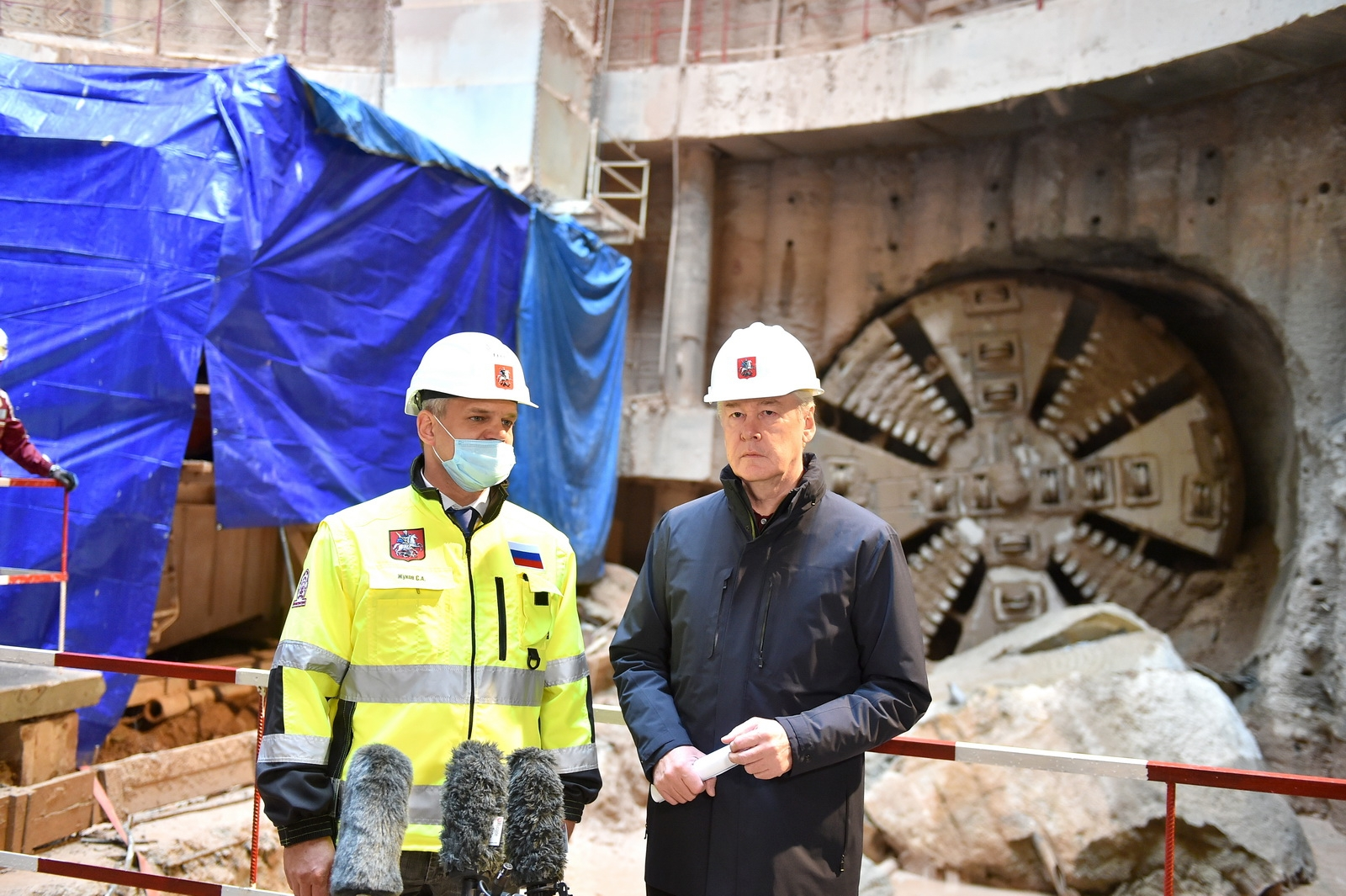
Mayor Sergey Sobyanin (right) visiting the site in 2020

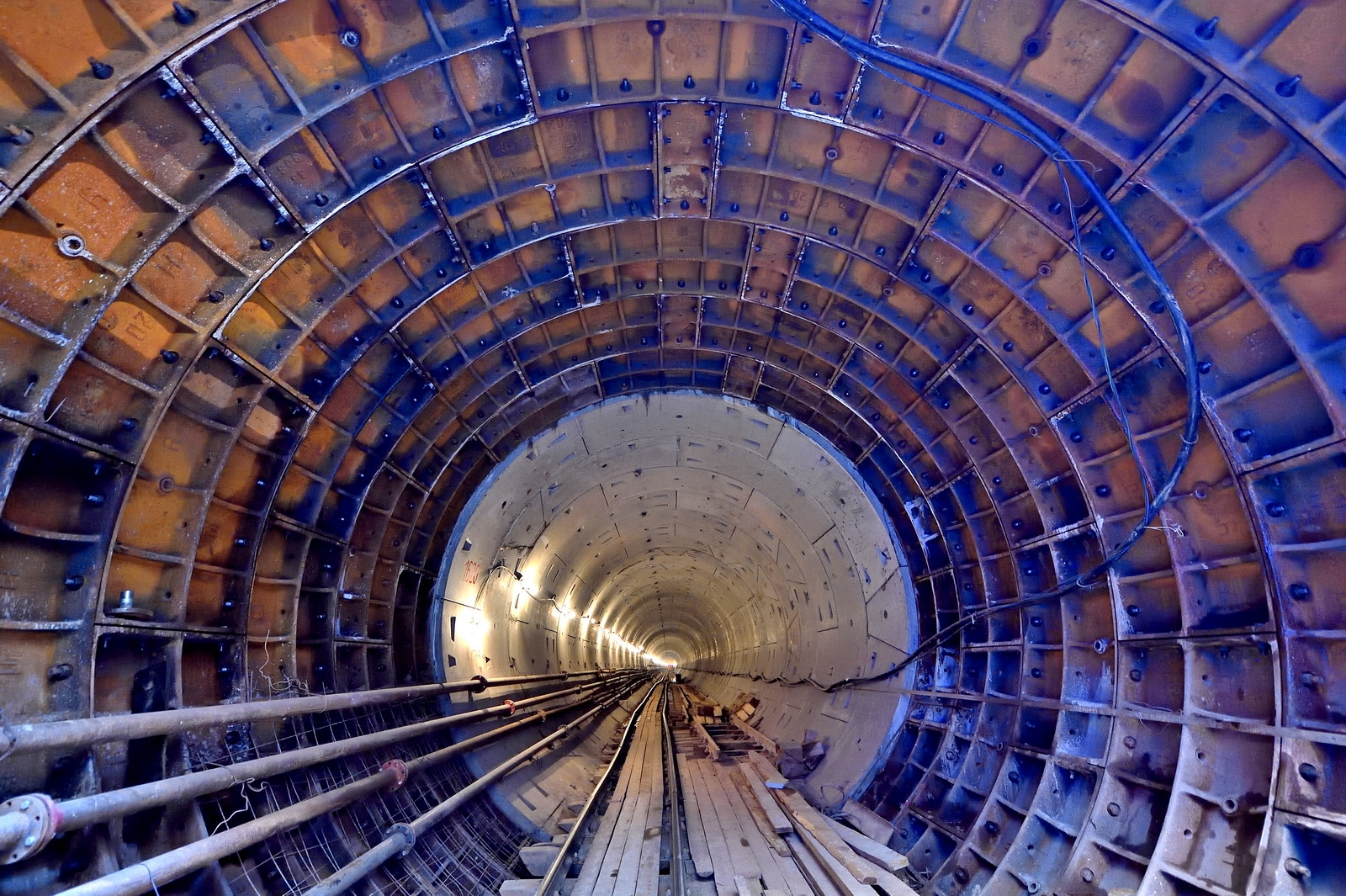
Tunnel under construction, 2020
