= Preobrazhenskaya Ploshchad =

Moscow Metro station

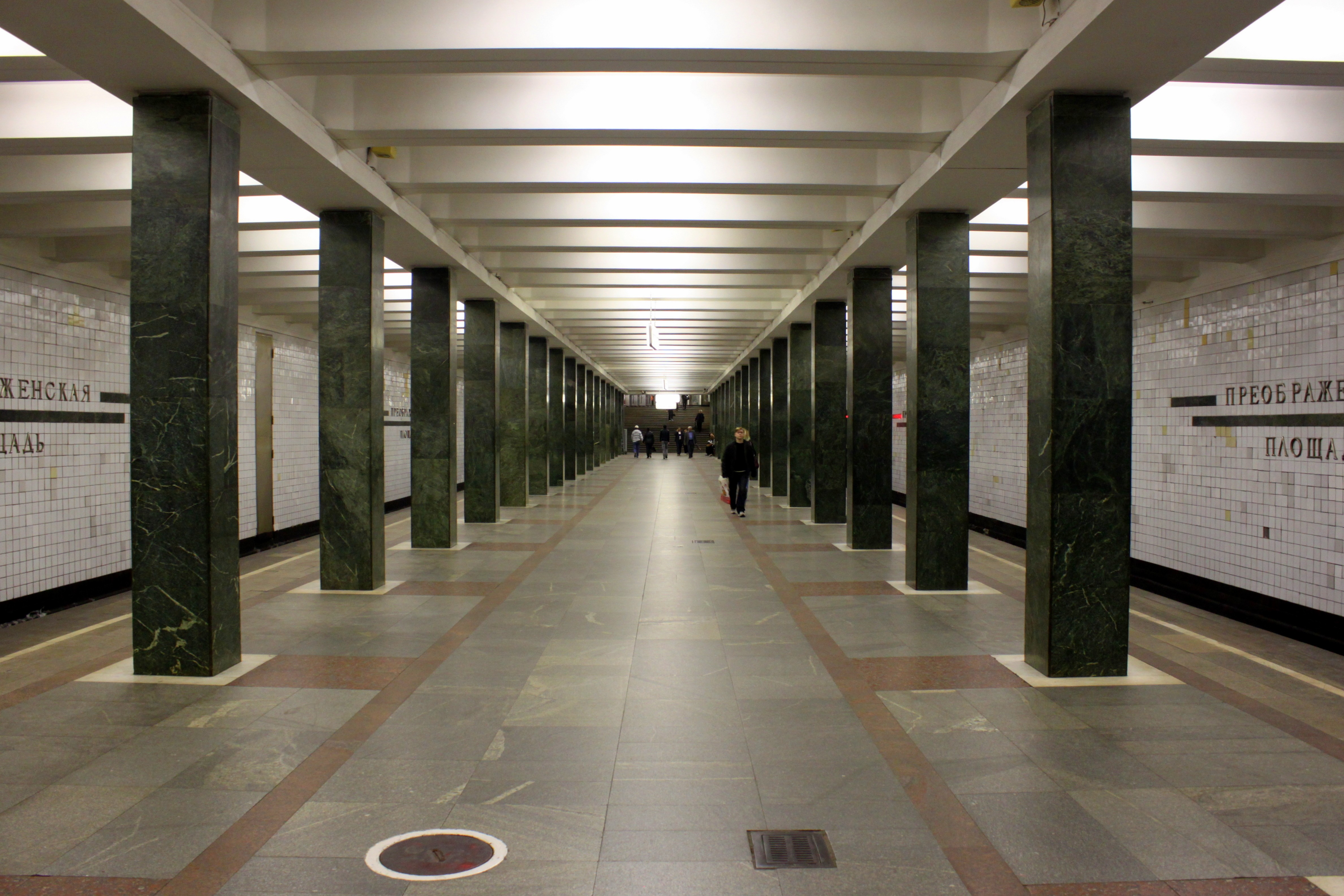

General information
- Location: Preobrazhenskaya Square, Preobrazhenskoye District, Eastern Administrative Okrug, Moscow; Russia
- Coordinates: 55.7963°N 37.7151°E
- System: Moscow Metro station
- Owner: Moskovsky Metropoliten
- Line: Sokolnicheskaya line
- Platforms: 1 island platform
- Tracks: 2
- Connections: Bus: 34, 52, 80, 86, 171, 230, 716; Trolleybus: 32, 41, 83; Tram: 2, 4, 7, 11, 13, 33, 36, 46

Construction
- Structure type: Shallow column tri-vault
- Depth: 8 metres (26 ft)
- Platform levels: 1

Other information
- Station code: 003

History
- Opened: 31 December 1965; 60 years ago
- Rebuilt: 2009—2010

Services
Preceding station	Moscow Metro	Following station
Sokolniki towards Potapovo	Sokolnicheskaya line	Cherkizovskaya towards Bulvar Rokossovskogo
Route map
Location
- Location within Moscow Metro

Preobrazhenskaya Ploshchad (Russian: Преображе́нская пло́щадь, English: Transfiguration Square) is a Moscow Metro station in the Preobrazhenskoye District, Eastern Administrative Okrug, Moscow. It is on the Sokolnicheskaya Line, between Sokolniki and Cherkizovskaya stations.

== Name ==
It is named after Preobrazhenskaya Square (Preobrazhenskaya Ploshchad in Russian).

== History ==
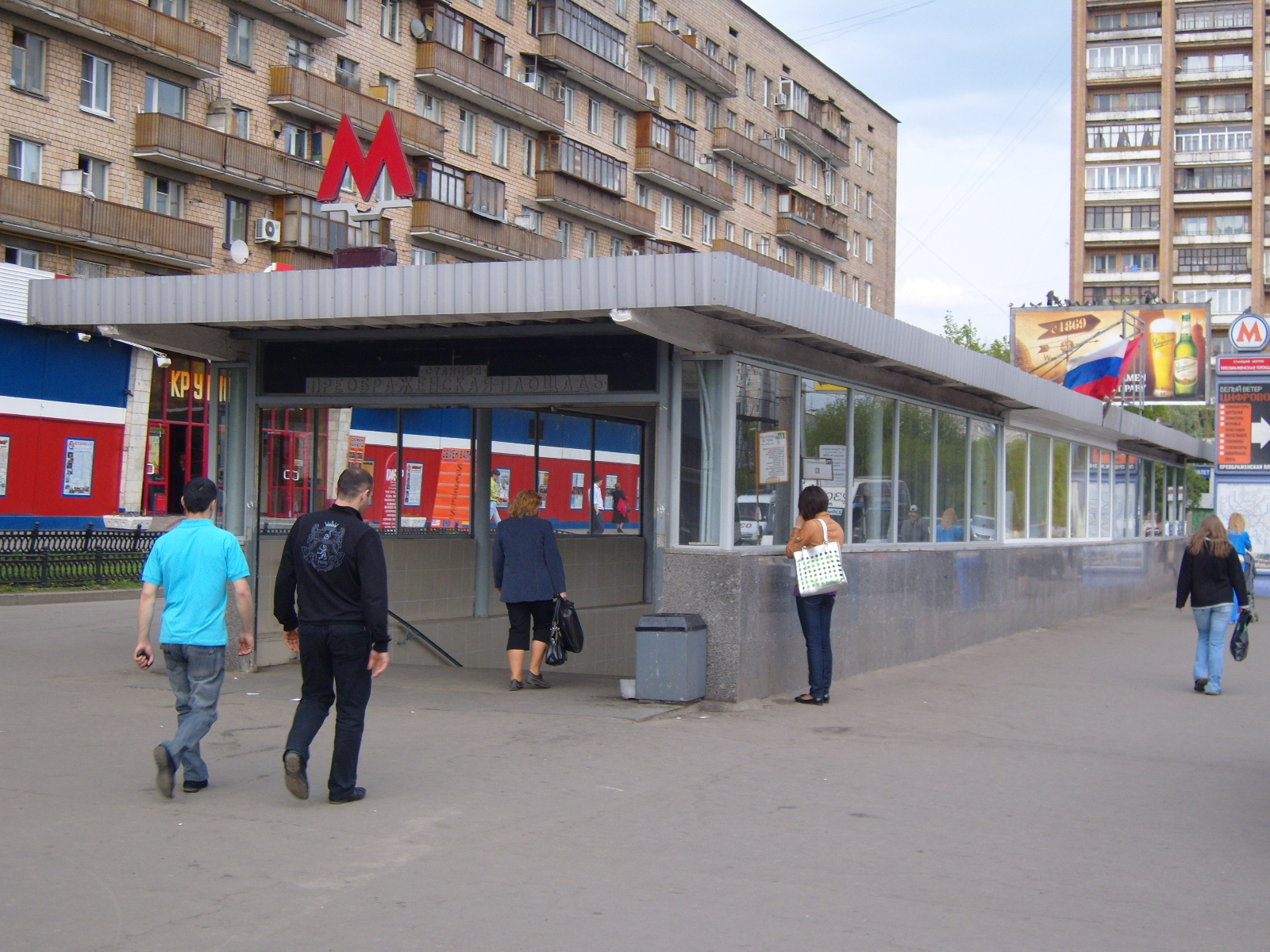
Northern entrance.

The station opened on 31 December 1965 during the extension of the Sokolnicheskaya Line to the north. As it used to be the line's terminus, the reversing sidings are in place to the northwest of the station.

== Entrances ==
Preobrazhenskaya Ploshchad's two vestibules are underground, with exits into Preobrazhenskaya Square, Preobrazhensky Val, Bolshaya Cherkizovskaya and Krasnobogatyrskaya streets.

== Reconstruction ==
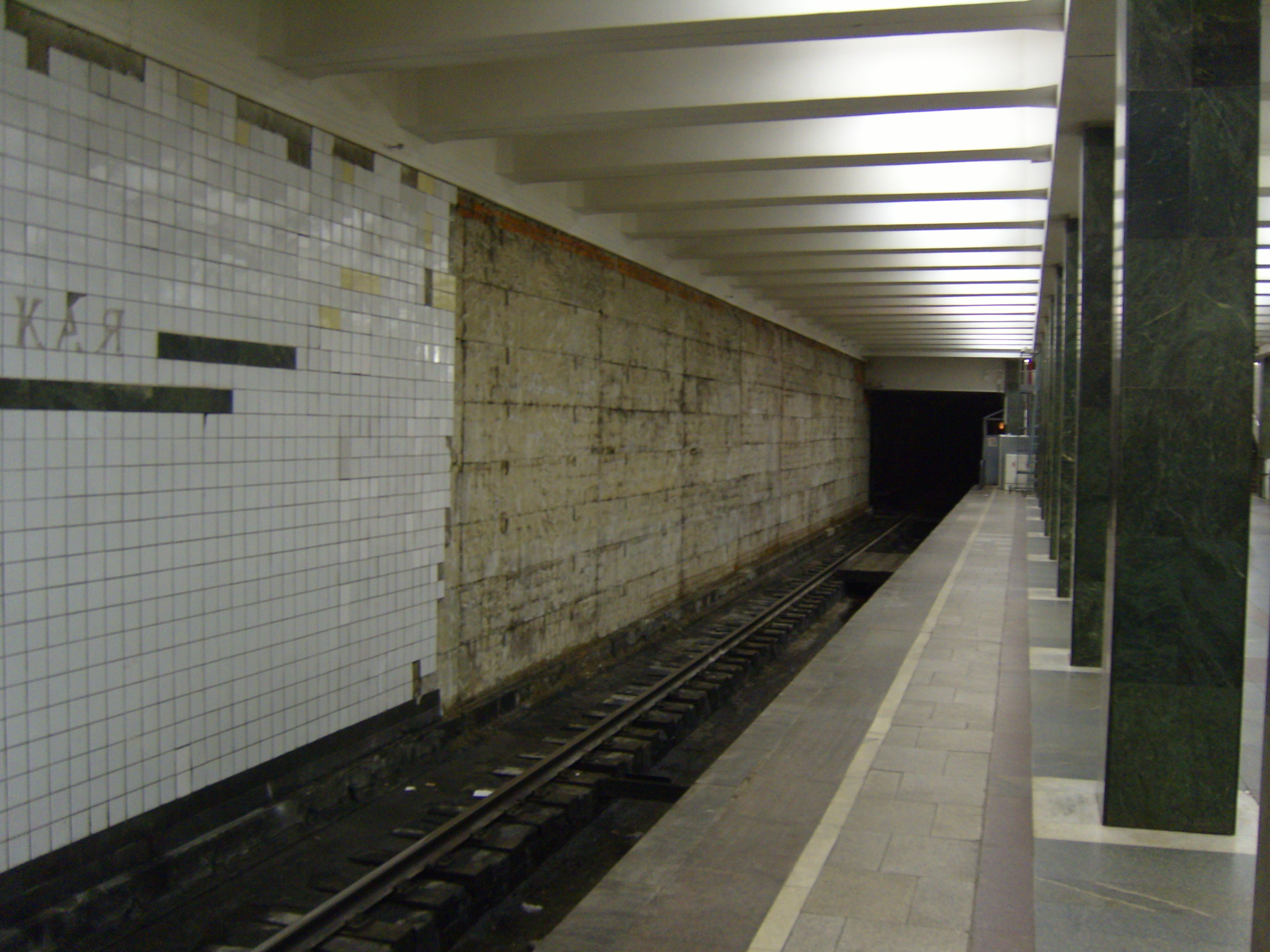
View of the platform. Note the broken wall

In December 2009 the wall renovation started. The aim was to make the walls look like the ones at Akademicheskaya station. By the middle of March 2010 the renovation was complete.
