= Expansion timeline of the Moscow Metro =

Below is the history of the expansion of the Moscow Metro in Moscow, Russia.

The line number only reflects the section it serves today. The original line the station served at the time of opening may be different due to lines being divided, shifted to or merged with other lines afterwards.

== Timeline list ==
No.	Segment	Date	New stations	Segment length (km)	Total stations	Total length (km)	Notes
1	Sokolniki — Park Kultury — Smolenskaya	1935-05-15	13	12.0	13	12.0	Branch from Okhotny Ryad to Smolenskaya
2	Smolenskaya — Kiyevskaya	1937-03-20	1	1.4	14	13.4	
3	Aleksandrovsky Sad — Kurskaya	1938-03-13	2	3.2	16	15.7	
4	Teatralnaya — Sokol	1938-09-11	6	8.5	22	24.2	Excluding Tverskaya
5	Teatralnaya — Avtozavodskaya	1943-01-01	1	6.2	23	30.4	Excluding Novokuznetskaya and Paveletskaya
6	Novokuznetskaya, Paveletskaya	1943-11-20	2	0	25	30.4	
7	Kurskaya — Partizanskaya	1944-01-18	3	7.1	28	37.5	Excluding Elektrozavodskaya
8	Elektrozavodskaya	1944-05-15	1	0	29	37.5	
9	Park Kultury — Kurskaya	1950-01-01	6	6.5	35	44.0	
10	Kurskaya — Belorusskaya	1952-01-30	4	7.0	39	51.0	
11	Ploshchad Revolyutsii — Kiyevskaya	1953-04-05	3	3.9	38	50.9	Ploshchad Revolyutsii — Kiyevskaya segment through Aleksandrovsky Sad closed (4 stations, 4.0 km)
12	Belorusskaya — Park Kultury	1954-03-14	2	5.9	40	56.8	
13	Partizanskaya — Pervomayskaya (closed)	1954-09-24	1	1.5	41	58.3	Temporary station opened until 1961.
14	Park Kultury — Sportivnaya	1957-05-01	2	2.5	43	60.8	
15	Prospekt Mira — VDNKh	1958-05-01	4	4.5	47	65.3	
16	Kiyevskaya — Kutuzovskaya	1958-11-07	2	2.3	53	70.7	Aleksandrovsky Sad — Kiyevskaya segment reopened (4 stations, 3.1 km)
17	Sportivnaya — Universitet	1959-01-12	2	4.5	55	75.2	
18	Kutuzovskaya — Fili	1959-11-07	1	1.7	56	76.9	
19	Fili — Pionerskaya	1961-10-13	3	3.5	59	80.4	
20	Partizanskaya — Pervomayskaya	1961-10-21	2	3.8	60	82.7	Segment leading to temporary Pervomayskaya station closed (1,5 km)
21	Oktyabrskaya — Novye Cheryomushki	1962-10-13	5	8.1	65	90.8	Excluding Shabolovskaya
22	Pervomayskaya — Shchyolkovskaya	1963-07-22	1	1.6	66	92.4	
23	Universitet — Yugo-Zapadnaya	1963-12-30	2	4.5	68	96.9	
24	Novye Cheryomushki — Kaluzhskaya (closed)	1964-04-15	1	1.5	69	98.4	Temporary station opened until 1974.
25	Sokol — Rechnoy Vokzal	1964-12-30	3	6.2	72	104.6	
26	Pionerskaya — Molodyozhnaya	1965-07-05	1	3.8	73	108.4	Excluding Kuntsevskaya
27	Kuntsevskaya	1965-08-31	1	0	74	108.4	
28	Sokolniki — Preobrazhenskaya Ploshchad	1965-12-31	1	2.5	75	110.9	
29	Taganskaya — Vykhino	1966-12-31	7	12.9	82	123.8	
30	Avtozavodskaya — Kakhovskaya	1969-08-11	4	9.5	86	133.3	Kashirskaya — Kakhovskaya segment opened as part of
31	Oktyabrskaya — Kitay-gorod	1970-12-30	2	3.9	88	137.2	
32	Taganskaya — Kitay-gorod	1970-12-30	1	2.1	89	139.3	
33	Kitay-gorod — Prospekt Mira	1971-12-31	2	3.2	91	142.5	
34	Barrikadnaya — Oktyabrskoye Pole	1972-12-30	5	7.2	96	149.7	
35	Novye Cheryomushki — Belyayevo	1974-08-12	2	3.6	97	151.8	Temporary segment to the old Kaluzhskaya station closed (1.5 km)
36	Kitay-gorod — Barrikadnaya	1975-12-17	2	4.1	99	155.9	
37	Oktyabrskoye Pole — Planernaya	1975-12-30	4	9.6	103	165.5	Excluding Spartak
38	VDNKh — Medvedkovo	1978-09-29	4	8.1	107	173.6	
39	Tverskaya	1979-07-20	1	0	108	173.6	
40	Marksistskaya — Novogireyevo	1979-12-30	6	11.4	114	185.0	
41	Shabolovskaya	1980-11-05	1	0	115	185.0	
42	Serpukhovskaya — Yuzhnaya	1983-11-04	8	13.0	122	198.0	Vorobyovy Gory station closed in 1983
43	Kashirskaya — Orekhovo	1984-12-30	3	6.4	125	204.4	Segment soon closed due to flooding. Re-opened in 1985.
44	Orekhovo — Krasnogvardeyskaya	1985-09-07	2	3.4	127	207.8	
45	Yuzhnaya — Prazhskaya	1985-11-06	1	1,1	128	208.9	
46	Serpukhovskaya — Borovitskaya	1986-01-23	2	2.8	130	211.7	
47	Marksistskaya — Tretyakovskaya	1986-01-25	1	1.7	131	213.4	
48	Belyayevo — Tyoply Stan	1987-11-06	2	2.9	133	216.3	
49	Borovitskaya — Chekhovskaya	1987-12-31	1	1.6	134	217.9	
50	Chekhovskaya — Savyolovskaya	1988-12-31	3	4.2	137	222.1	
51	Molodyozhnaya — Krylatskoye	1989-12-31	1	1.9	138	224.0	
52	Tyoply Stan — Novoyasenevskaya	1990-01-17	2	3.6	140	227.6	
53	Preobrazhenskaya Ploshchad — Bulvar Rokossovskogo	1990-08-03	2	3.8	142	231.4	
54	Savyolovskaya — Otradnoye	1991-03-07	5	8.5	147	239.9	
55	Otradnoye — Bibirevo	1992-12-31	1	2.6	148	242.5	
56	Bibirevo — Altufyevo	1994-07-15	1	2.0	149	243.6	
57	Kashirskaya	1995-11-20	0	0	150	243.6	Kashirskaya—Kakhovskaya branch of detached as.
58	Chkalovskaya — Volzhskaya	1995-12-28	6	12.1	156	256.6	Excluding Dubrovka
59	Volzhskaya — Maryino	1996-12-25	3	5.4	159	262.0	
60	Dubrovka	1999-12-11	1	0	160	262.0	
61	Prazhskaya — Ulitsa Akademika Yangelya	2000-08-31	1	2.0	161	264.0	
62	Ulitsa Akademika Yangelya — Annino	2001-12-12	1	1.4	162	265.4	
63	Annino — Bulvar Dmitriya Donskogo	2002-12-26	1	2.0	164	267.4	Vorobyovy Gory re-opened in 2002.
64	Kiyevskaya — Park Pobedy	2003-05-06	1	3.2	165	270.6	
65	Ulitsa Starokachalovskaya — Buninskaya Alleya	2003-12-27	5	5.5	170	276.1	
66	Timiryazevskaya — Ulitsa Sergeya Eyzenshteyna	2004-11-20	6	4.7			Was not considered a part of Moscow Metro until 2016
67	Kiyevskaya — Vystavochnaya	2005-09-10	1	2.2	171	278.3	Branch off Filyovskaya line
68	Vystavochnaya — Mezhdunarodnaya	2006-08-30	1	0.5	172	278.7	
69	Chkalovskaya — Trubnaya	2007-08-30	1	3.72	173	282.42	Excluding Sretensky Bulvar
70	Sretensky Bulvar	2007-12-29	1	0	174	282.42	
71	Park Pobedy — Strogino	2008-01-07	2	11.68	176	292.2	Excluding Slavyansky Bulvar. Kuntsevskaya – Krylatskoye segment detached from for
72	Slavyansky Bulvar	2008-09-07	1	0	177	292.2	
73	Strogino — Mitino	2009-12-26	3	6.6	180	298.8	
74	Trubnaya — Maryina Roshcha	2010-06-19	2	3.07	182	301.2	
75	Maryino — Zyablikovo	2011-12-02	3	4.5	185	305.7	
76	Novogireyevo — Novokosino	2012-08-30	1	3.2	186	308.9	
77	Krasnogvardeyskaya — Alma-Atinskaya	2012-12-24	1	3.09	187	311.7	
78	Mitino — Pyatnitskoye Shosse	2012-12-28	1	2	188	313.1	
79	Vykhino — Zhulebino	2013-11-09	2	4.6	190	317.5	
80	Delovoy Tsentr – Park Pobedy	2014-01-31	2	3.4	192	320.9	Segment of Kalininsko-Solntsevskaya Line that is not connected to the rest
81	Ulitsa Starokachalovskaya – Bittsevsky Park	2014-02-27	2	4.5	194	325.4	
82	Spartak	2014-08-27	1	0	195	325.4	
83	Yugo-Zapadnaya – Troparyovo	2014-12-08	1	2.1	196	327.5	
84	Zhulebino – Kotelniki	2015-09-21	1	1.5	197	329	
85	Tekhnopark	2015-12-28	1	0	198	329	
86	Troparyovo – Rumyantsevo	2016-01-18	1	2.5	199	331.5	
87	Rumyantsevo – Salaryevo	2016-02-15	1	1.8	200	333.3	
88	Moscow Central Circle	2016-09-10	26	54			Excluding Sokolinaya Gora, Dubrovka, Zorge, Panfilovskaya and Koptevo
89	Maryina Roshcha — Petrovsko-Razumovskaya	2016-09-16	3	4.4	203	337.7	
90	Sokolinaya Gora, Dubrovka	2016-10-11	2	0			
91	Koptevo	2016-11-01	1	0			
92	Zorge	2016-11-04	1	0			
93	Panfilovskaya	2016-11-08	1	0			
94	Ramenki – Park Pobedy	2017-03-16	3	8.5	206	346.2	
95	Rechnoy Vokzal – Khovrino	2017-12-31	1	3.3	207	349.5	Excluding Belomorskaya
96	Delovoy Tsentr – Petrovsky Park	2018-02-26	5	10.2	212	359.7	
97	Petrovsko-Razumovskaya — Seligerskaya	2018-03-22	3	4.9	215	364.6	
98	Ramenki — Rasskazovka	2018-08-30	7	14.2	222	378.8	
99	Belomorskaya	2018-12-20	1	0	223	378.8	
100	Petrovsky Park — Savyolovskaya	2018-12-30	1	1.9	224	380.7	
101	Kosino — Nekrasovka	2019-06-03	4	5.6	228	386.3	
102	Salaryevo — Kommunarka	2019-06-20	4	9.4	232	395.7	
103	Lefortovo — Kosino	2020-03-27	6	15.1	238	409.1	
104	Lefortovo — Elektrozavodskaya	2020-12-31	1	1.0	239	410.1	
105	Khoroshyovskaya — Mnyovniki	2021-04-01	2	4.6	241	414.7	
106	Mnyovniki — Kakhovskaya	2021-12-07	9	23.9	250	438.6	
107	Kashirskaya — Savyolovskaya	2023-03-01	8	10.5	258	449.1	
108	Rasskazovka — Aeroport Vnukovo	2023-09-06	2	5.5	260	454.6	
109	Seligerskaya — Fiztekh	2023-09-07	3	6	263	460.6	
110	Novomoskovskaya — Potapovo	2024-09-05	1	2.4	264	463	
111	Novatorskaya — Tyutchevskaya	2024-09-07	4	8.7	268	471.7	
112	Tyutchevskaya — Novomoskovskaya	2024-12-28	3	7.2	271	478.9	
113	Novatorskaya — ZIL	2025-9-13	4	8	275	486.9	
114	Bulvar Generala Karbysheva — Delovoy Tsentr	2026-9-5	5	6.9	278	493.8	Shelepikha and Delovoy Tsentr reopened on the Rublyovo-Arkhangelskaya line after a two-year closure
No.	Segment	Date	New stations	Segment length (km)	Total stations	Total length (km)	Notes

== Graphic timeline ==
Data
