= Prokshino (Moscow Metro) =

Moscow Metro station

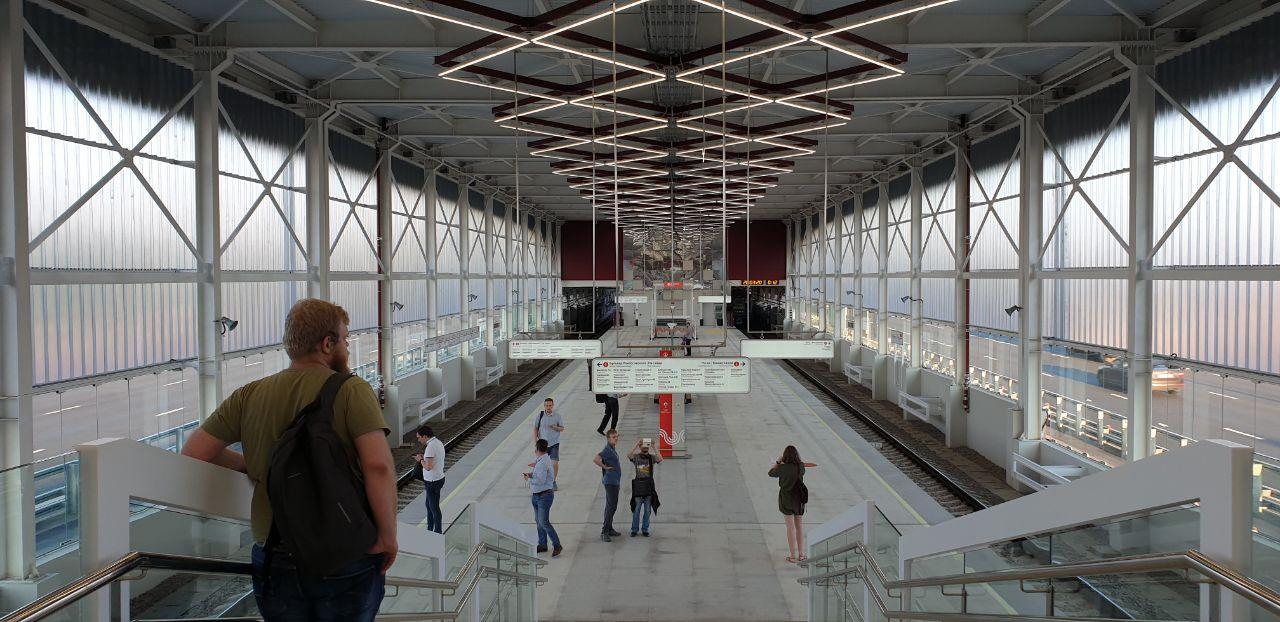

General information
- Location: Kommunarka; Sosenskoye Settlement; Novomoskovsky Administrative Okrug; Moscow; Russia
- Coordinates: 55.5605°N 37.4696°E
- System: Moscow Metro station
- Owner: Moskovsky Metropoliten
- Line: Sokolnicheskaya line
- Platforms: 1 island platform

Construction
- Structure type: Covered, aboveground

History
- Opened: 20 June 2019

Services
Preceding station	Moscow Metro	Following station
Olkhovaya towards Potapovo	Sokolnicheskaya line	Filatov Lug towards Bulvar Rokossovskogo
Route map
Location

Prokshino (Russian: Прокшино) is a Moscow Metro station on the Sokolnicheskaya line. It was opened on 20 June 2019, as part of an extension that included Kommunarka (now Novomoskovskaya), Filatov Lug, and Olkhovaya.

It is in the Kommunarka area of Sosenskoye Settlement in the Novomoskovsky Administrative Okrug southwest of Moscow. It is an aboveground station along the Solntsevo-Butovo-Vidnoye Highway. The name Prokshino refers to a former village where the station is stand.

== History ==
The city government decided to extend the line to Stolbovo in February 2016; an unexpected decision given that the city initially planned to extend the line only to Filatov Lug. The initial cost of the line was about 45 billion rubles. In July 2017, the city government confirmed that the extension would move forward, allowing construction to continue.

In March 2017, the city began clearing space around the planned station to accommodate the construction.

In 2022, the city plans to complete a tram line that connects the station to the town of Troitsk.

== Design and layout ==
The station has a single lobby with entrances on either side of the highway. Passengers is access the station via elevated walkways over the highway.
