= Median strip =

Reserved area that separates opposing lanes of traffic on divided roadways

Typical left-hand motorway road layout in Ireland and South Africa

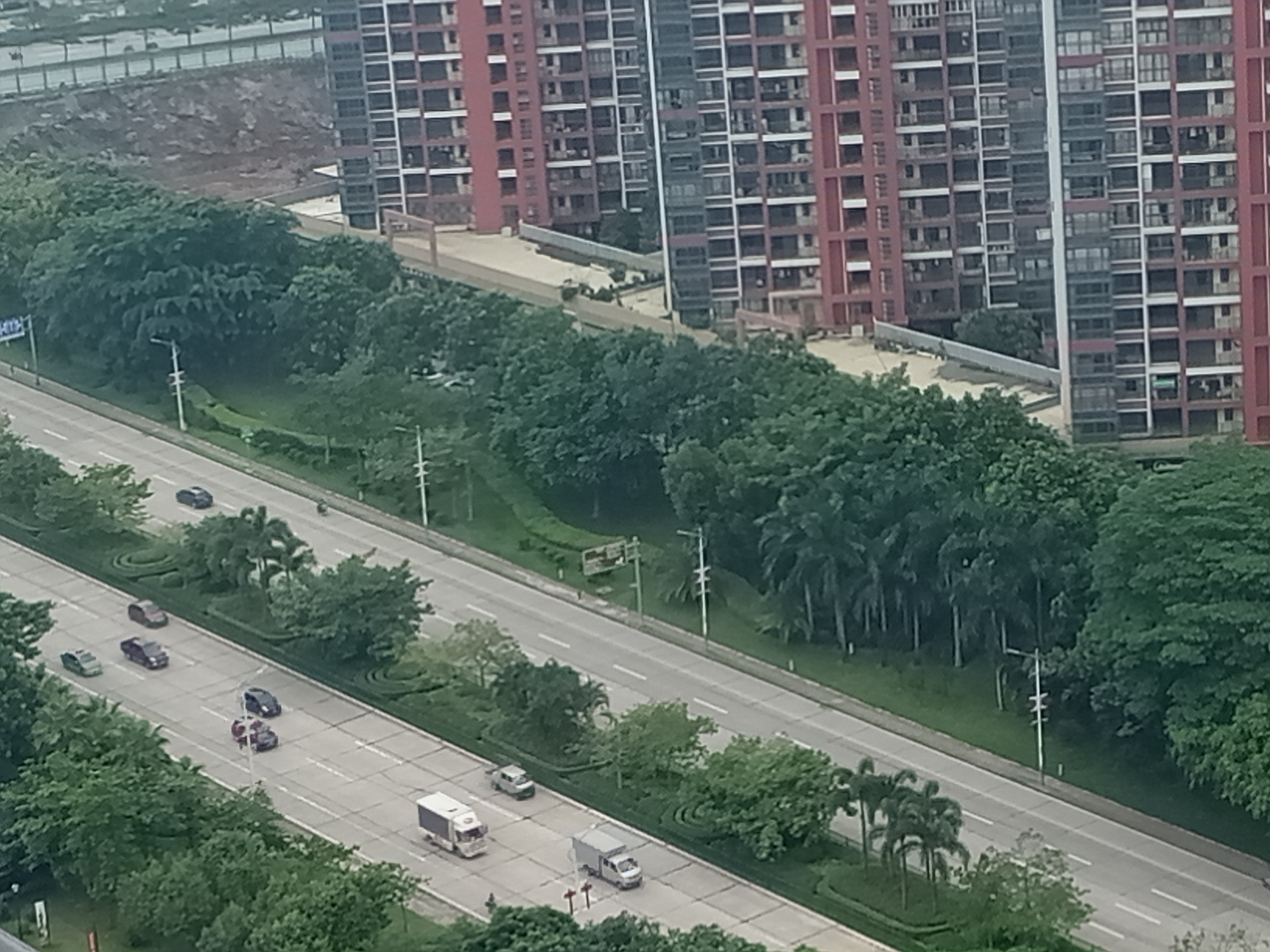
Divided median strip on a boulevard in Huizhou, China

A median strip, central reservation, roadway median, or traffic median is the reserved area that separates opposing lanes of traffic on divided roadways such as divided highways, freeways, and motorways. The term also applies to divided roadways other than highways, including some major streets in urban or suburban areas. The reserved area may simply be paved, but commonly it is adapted to other functions; for example, it may accommodate decorative landscaping, trees, a median barrier, or railway, rapid transit, light rail, or streetcar lines.

== Regional terminology ==
There is no international English standard for the term. Median, median strip, and median divider island are common in North American and Antipodean English. Variants in North American English include regional terms such as neutral ground in New Orleans usage or boulevard in Vancouver, British Columbia.

In British English the central reservation or central median is the preferred usage; it also occurs widely in formal documents in some non-British regions such as South Africa, where there are other informal regional words (for example middelmannetjie, which originally referred to the hump between wheel ruts on a dust road). Neutral section and central nature strip are coinages in Australian English.

Additionally, different terminology is used to identify traffic lanes in a multi-lane roadway. North American usage calls the leftmost lanes located closest to the roadway centerline the "inner" lanes, while British usage calls these lanes the "outer" lanes. Thus, it is less confusing to call these central lanes the "passing", "fast", or "overtaking" lanes in international contexts, instead of using the ambiguous inner/outer distinction. Regional differences between right-hand traffic and left-hand traffic can cause further confusion.

== Physical attributes ==
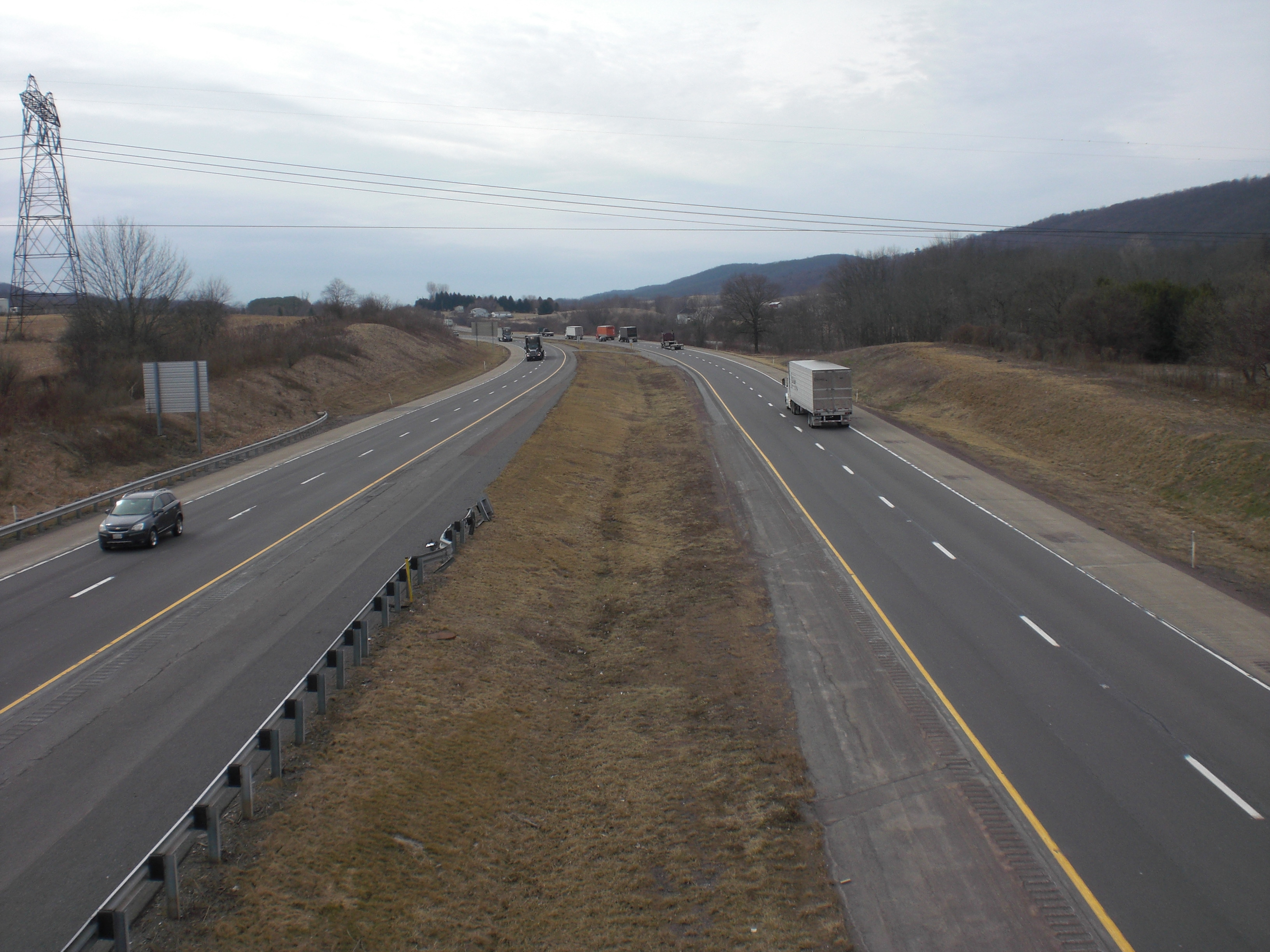
A grass median strip on Interstate 80 in Pennsylvania, United States

Some medians function secondarily as green areas and green belts to beautify roadways. Jurisdictions can: plant lawn grasses with regular mowing; hydroseed or scatter wildflower seeds to germinate, bloom, and re-seed themselves annually; or create extensive landscape plantings of trees, shrubs, herbaceous perennials and ornamental grasses. Where space is at a premium, dense hedges of shrubs filter the headlights of oncoming traffic and provide a resilient barrier. In other areas, the median may be occupied by a right-of-way for a public transportation system such as a light rail or rapid transit line; for example, the Red and Blue Lines of the Chicago 'L' partially run in the medians of the Dan Ryan, Eisenhower, and Kennedy Expressways.

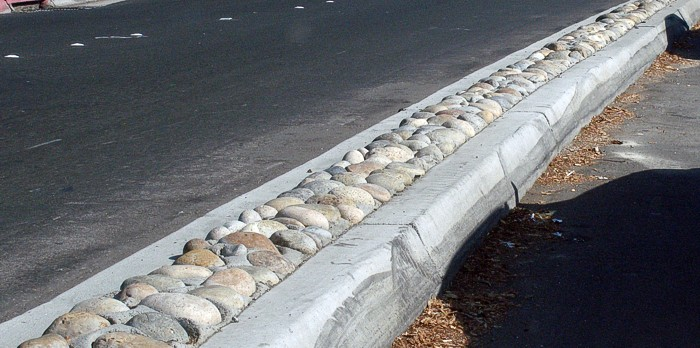
An arterial road median with decorative cobblestones in Redwood City, California

In contrast to the median of a major road, those in urban areas often take the form of central traffic islands that rise above the roadway. These are frequently found on urban arterial roads. In their simplest form, these are just raised concrete curbs, but can also be landscaped with grass or trees or decorated with bricks or stones. Such medians are also sometimes found on more minor or residential streets, where they serve primarily as a traffic-calming or landscaping element rather than a safety enhancement to restrict turns and separate opposite directions of high-volume traffic flow.

In some areas such as California, highway medians are sometimes no more than a demarcated section of the paved roadway, indicated by a space between two sets of double yellow lines. Such a double-double yellow line or painted median is legally similar to an island median: vehicles are not permitted to cross it, unlike a single set of double yellow lines which may in some cases permit turns across the line. This arrangement has been used to reduce costs, including narrower medians than are feasible with a planted strip, but research indicates that such narrow medians may have minimal safety benefit compared to no median at all.

The medians of United States Interstate Highways break only for emergency service lanes, with no such restrictions on lower classification roads. On British motorways, the median is never broken (except on the tidal flow of Aston Expressway), but there are no such restrictions on other dual carriageways.

== Width ==
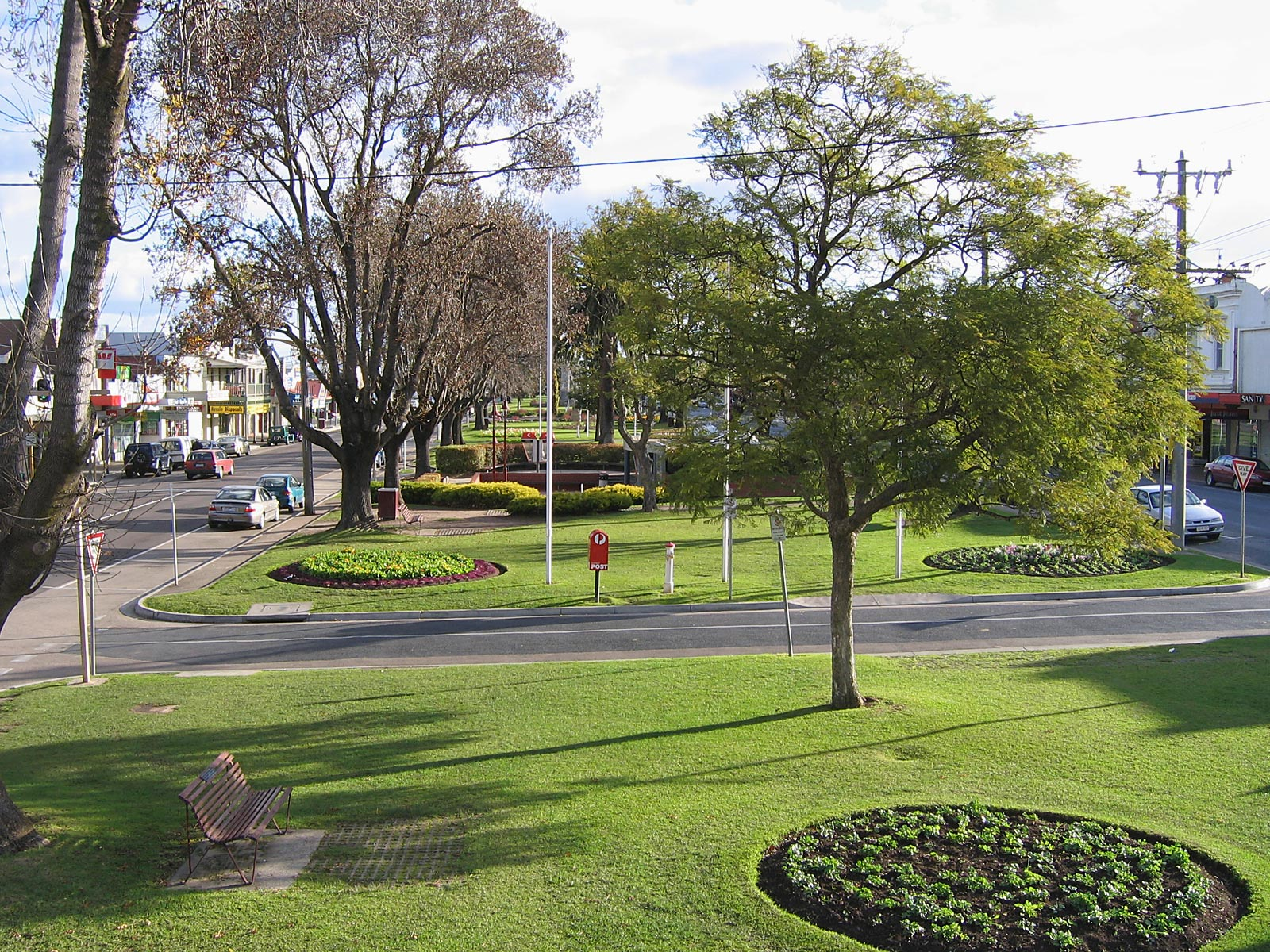
The wide median strip in Main Street, Bairnsdale, Victoria, Australia has been made into a garden feature of the town, wide enough to accommodate features such as flowerbeds and street furniture like benches and postboxes.

The central reservation in the United Kingdom and other densely populated European countries (where it is known by their local names) is usually no wider than a single lane of traffic. In some cases, however, it is extended. For instance, if the road is running through hilly terrain, the carriageways may have to be built on different levels of the slope. An example of this is on the M5 motorway as it climbs up the side of the Gordano Valley south of Bristol. In Birmingham and many other cities, suburban dual carriageways may have trees or cycle lanes in the middle as a wide central reservation.

Two examples on the UK road network where the carriageways are several hundred yards/metres apart, are on a section of the M6 between Shap and Tebay, which allows a local road to run between them, and on the M62 where the highest section through the Pennines famously splits wide enough to contain a farm. The other major exception is the A38(M) Aston Expressway, which is a single carriageway of seven lanes, where the median lane moves to account for traffic flow (a system known as tidal flow or reversible lane).

With effect from January 2005 and based primarily on safety grounds, the UK's Highways Agency's policy is that all new motorway schemes are to use high containment concrete step barriers in the median (central reservation). All existing motorways will introduce concrete barriers as part of ongoing upgrades and through replacement as and when the current systems have reached the end of their useful life. This change of policy applies only to barriers in the median of high speed roads and not to verge side barriers. Other routes will continue to use steel barriers.

In North America, and some other countries with large sparsely populated areas, opposing lanes of traffic may be separated by several hundred meters of fields or forests outside of heavily populated areas (an extreme example being the Trans-Canada Highway near Ernfold, Saskatchewan, Canada, where eastbound and westbound lanes go as far as 5 kilometres (3.1 mi) apart from each other), but converge to a lane's width of separation in suburban areas and cities. In urban areas, concrete barriers (such as Jersey barriers) and guard rails (or guide rails) are used.

In Dedham, Massachusetts, the Norfolk County Correctional Center (a state prison) is located entirely within a wide median of Massachusetts Route 128. This 502-bed facility was opened in 1993 as infill construction in the previously unused real estate that had been isolated by the divided highway in the early 1950s. An extreme example of a wide median can be found on Interstate 75 near Cincinnati, Ohio; nearly the entire village of Arlington Heights, as well as the downtown district of Lockland, are both located between the two directions of I-75. The space in the median is 2,540 ft.

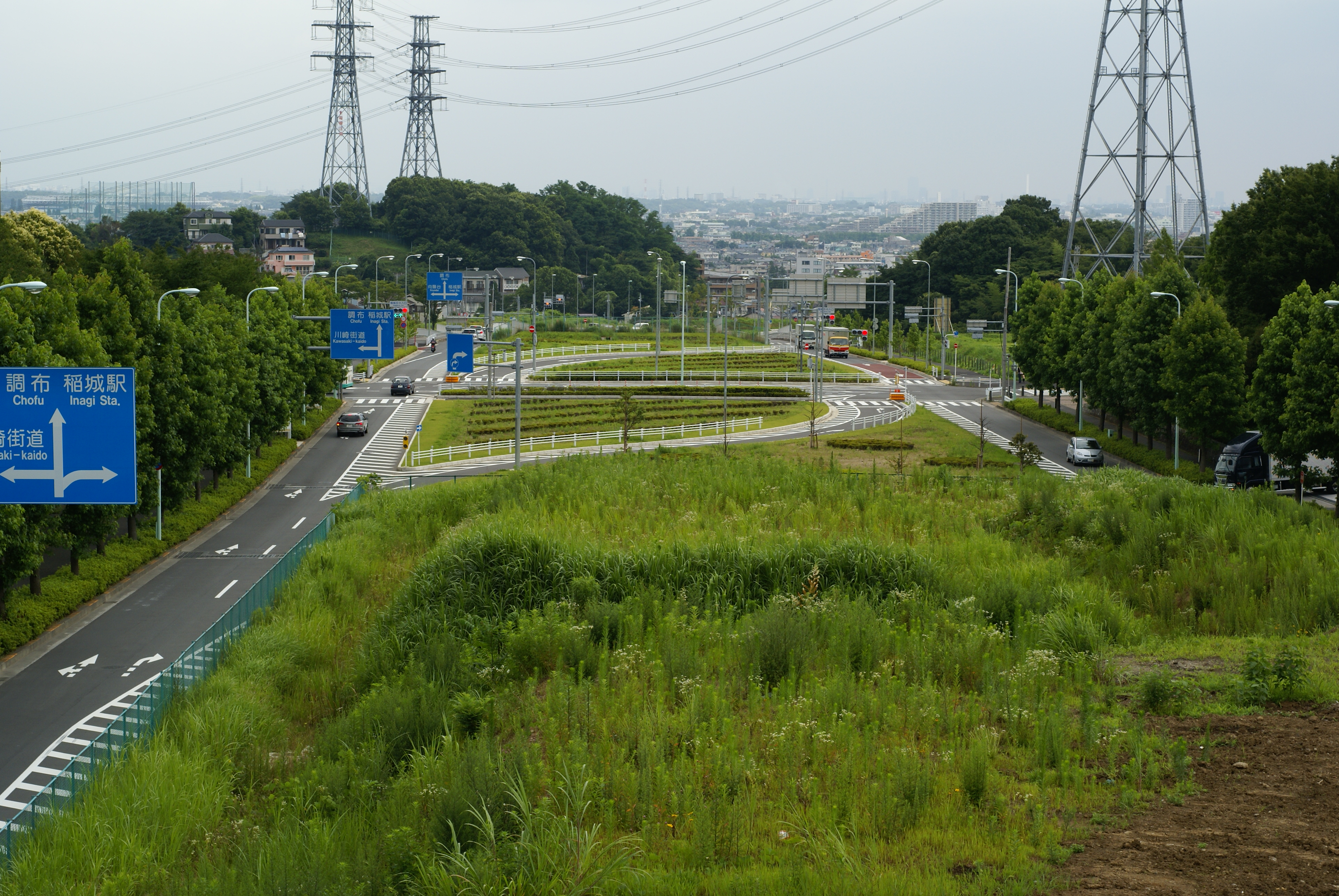
A 50-metre-wide median strip in Inagi, Tokyo.

== Inverted median ==
Some freeways in North America include "inverted" medians, which separate roadways running in the opposite direction from the standard for the country they are located in. Roads are so designed for a number of reasons, including to save space, for the creation of continuous flow intersections, or for diverging diamond interchanges.

- The north–south Golden State Freeway (I-5) in the Tehachapi Mountains of California between Los Angeles and the San Joaquin Valley. For several miles, the direction of traffic on both sides of the median is reversed — northbound traffic is on the western roadway and southbound traffic on the eastern roadway.
- I-85 in central North Carolina between Lexington and Thomasville features an inverted median, constructed so that an in-median, right-exit rest area can feature a historic bridge.
- I-77 in Charlotte, North Carolina, has a reverse median at its intersection over I-85 for on- and off-ramps without taking too much land from neighboring properties and without building many more bridges.
- I-84 used to have an inverted median through Waterbury, Connecticut, east of the 2-level "mixmaster" interchange with Route 8. This section of freeway was reconstructed in the 1970s, which eliminated the inverted median.

Inverted medians are also used in rare cases on local streets that historically had unusual traffic patterns, such as Bainbridge Street between 3rd Street and 5th Street in Philadelphia.

== Safety impact ==
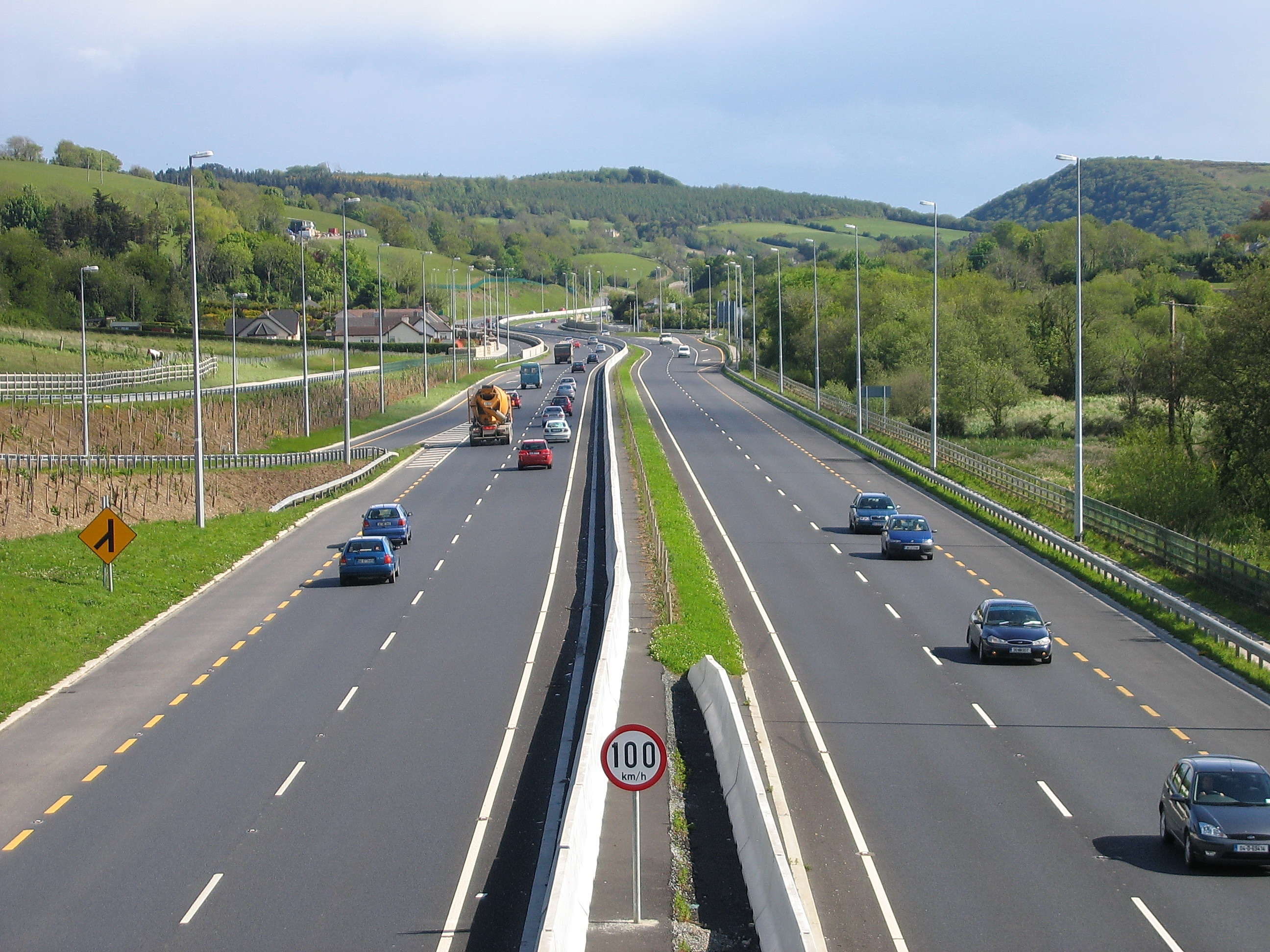
Concrete median barrier on the N11 road near Dublin, Ireland

An August 1993 study by the US Federal Highway Administration quantified the correlation between median width and the reduction of both head-on accidents and severe injuries. The study found that medians without barriers should be constructed more than 30 feet (9.1 m) wide in order to have any effect on safety, and that safety benefits of wider medians continue to increase to a width of 60 to 80 feet (18.3 to 24.4 m).

A consequence of this finding is that decreasing the size of a median to 20 feet (6.1 m) from 30 feet (9.1 m) to add lanes to a highway may result in a less safe highway. Statistics regarding medians with barriers were not calculated in this study.

== Bus rapid transit ==
Central reservations may also be used for reserved bus lanes, as in Istanbul's Metrobus, Los Angeles's J Line and Bogotá's TransMilenio. Center-lane running and island platforms installed in the medium reduce conflicts with stopped and parked cars as well as pedestrians near the curb, thus speeding service.

== Railway use ==
In some cases, the median strip of the highway may contain a train line, usually around major urban centers. This is often done to share a right-of-way, because of the expense and difficulty of clearing a route through dense urban neighborhoods. A reserved right-of-way is contrasted with street running, in which rail cars and automobiles occupy the same lanes of traffic.

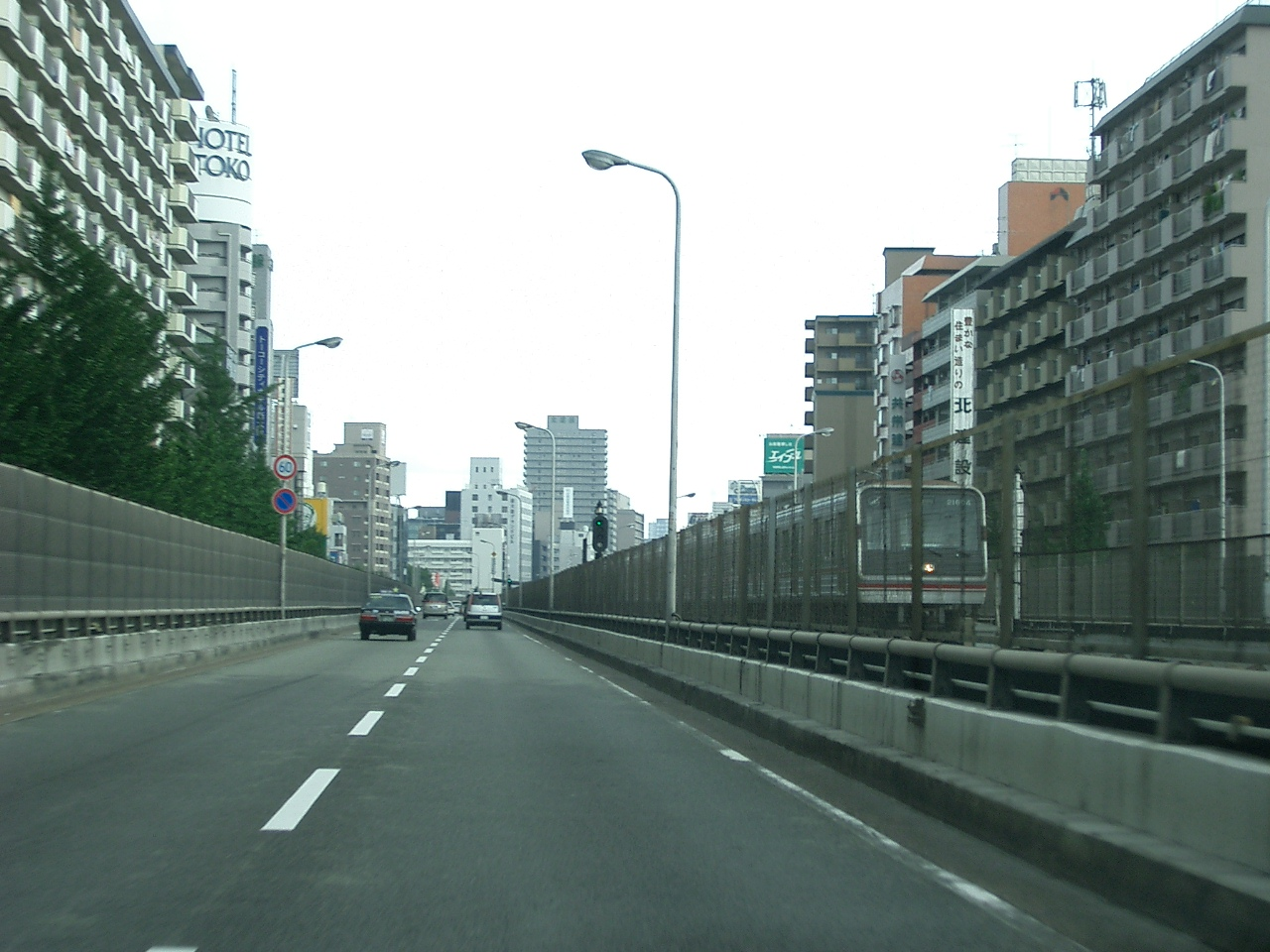
Japan National Route 423 in Kita-ku, Osaka with the Osaka Metro Midōsuji Line in the median.

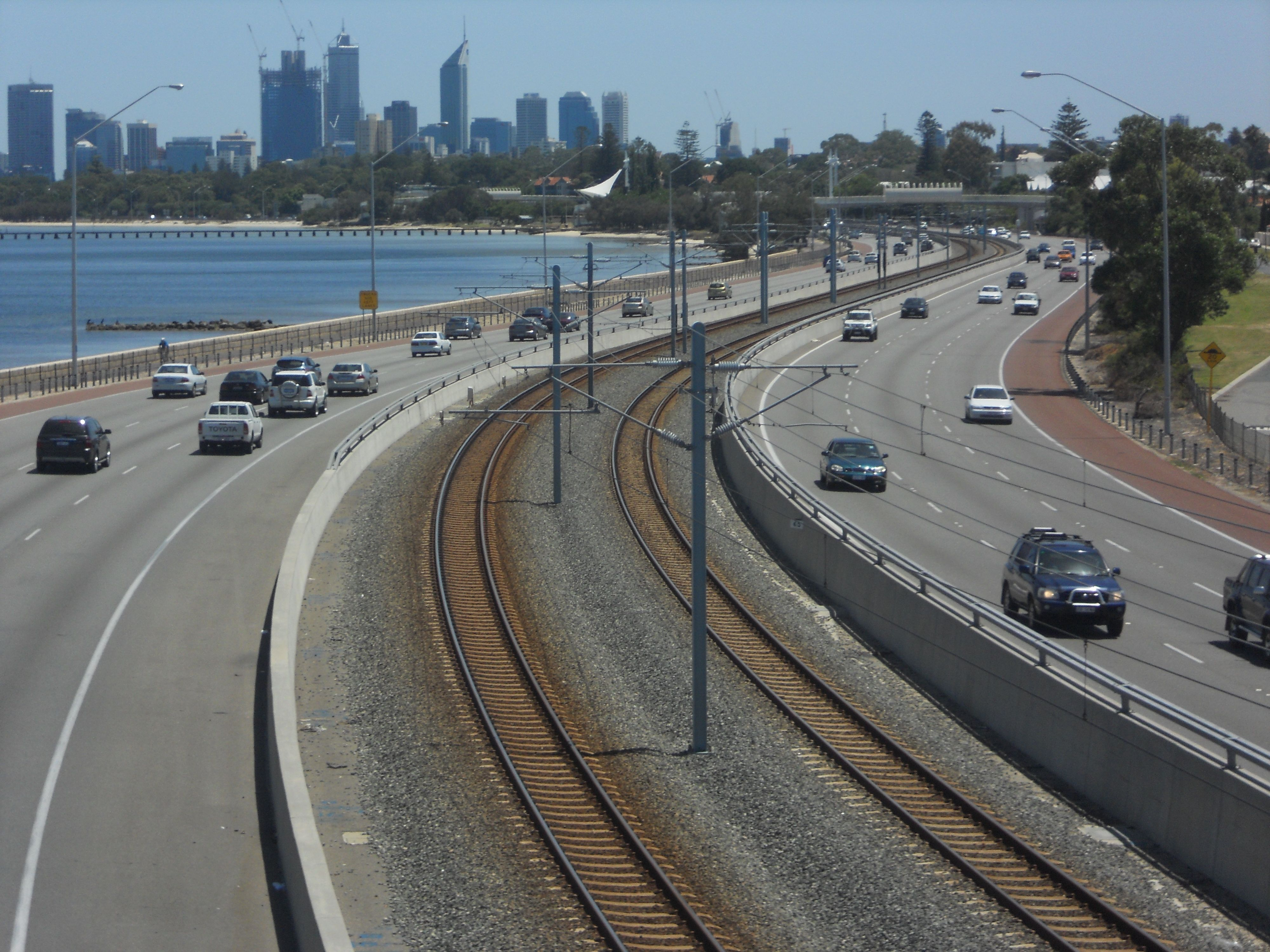
The Kwinana Freeway in Perth, Australia contains the Mandurah railway line

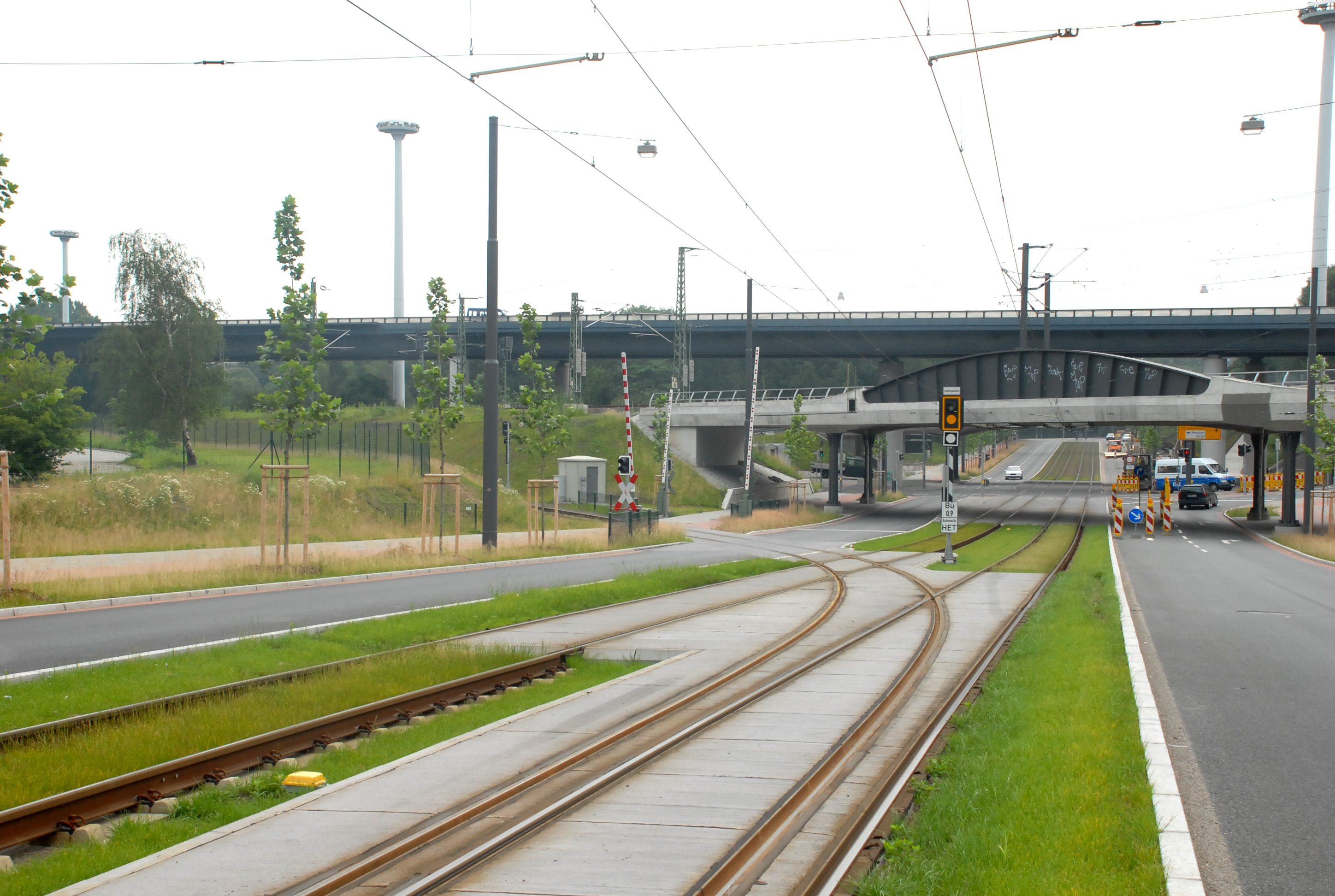
Median strip tramway in Bremen, Germany, an example of a median strip occupied by a tramway track.

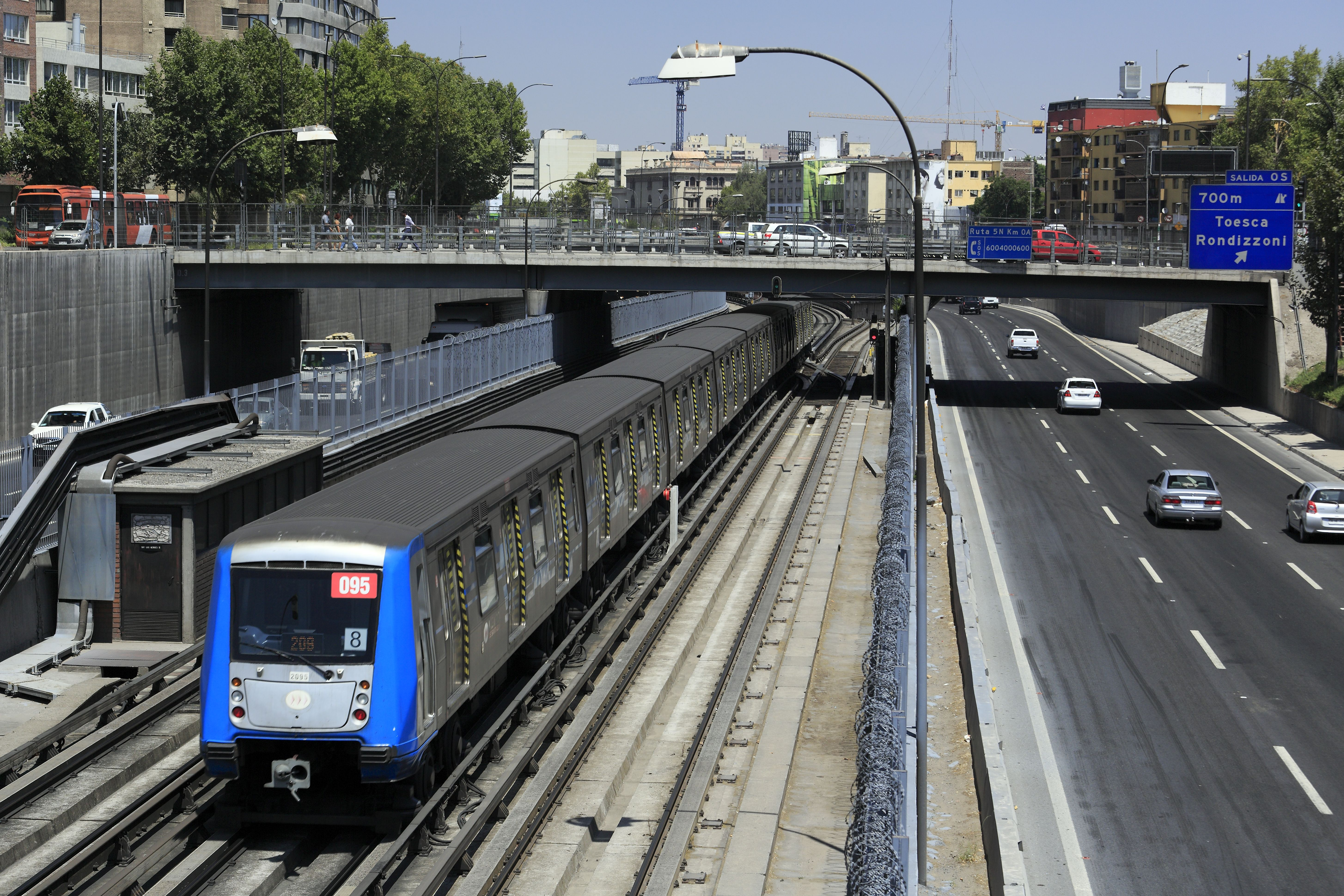
A part of the Pan American Highway in Chile contains the line 2 of the Santiago Metro in its median.

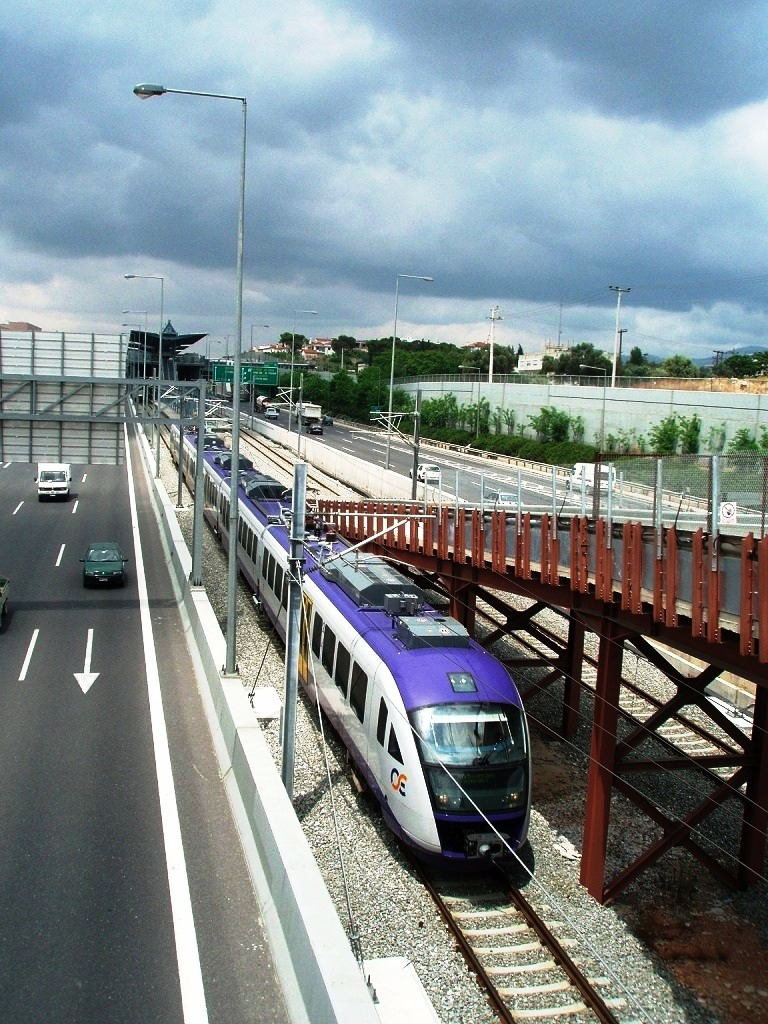
The A6 motorway (Attiki Odos) in Athens has commuter trains running in its median.

Train lines that run in the median of highways include:

=== Asia ===
- Beijing Subway Line 13 and Batong line run in the median of the G45 Daqing-Guangzhou Expressway and Jingtong Expressway, respectively.
- Hexi Tram in Nanjing along Jiangdong South Road.
- Israel Railways in the Tel Aviv metropolitan area along the Ayalon Highway.
- Kita-Osaka Kyuko Railway and the Osaka Metro Midōsuji Line along Japan National Route 423 (Shinmidō-suji) between Toyonaka, Osaka and Kita-ku, Osaka.
- Manila MRT Line 3 runs in the median of the Epifanio delos Santos Avenue (EDSA) between the latter's intersection with Taft Avenue in Pasay and a junction with North Avenue in Quezon City.
  - The LRT Line 1 also runs in the median of EDSA from the North Avenue junction where the tracks connect with neighboring Line 3 to the Bonifacio Monument in Caloocan. However, trains for this line only run until Roosevelt instead of North Avenue.
- The under-construction MRT Line 7 runs along the medians of North Avenue, at-grade in some portions of Commonwealth Avenue, Regalado Avenue and Quirino Highway.
- Tuen Ma line between Shek Mun station and Tai Shui Hang station along the A Kung Kok Street.

=== Europe ===
- The Athens Airport-Kiato railway and Athens Metro line M3 along the A6 motorway (Attiki Odos)
- The Ferrocarril de Sóller along Carrer Eusebi Estada in Palma de Mallorca
- The Paris Metro Line 8 along the D1, between Créteil–Université and its terminus at Pointe du Lac
- Line 25N from Brussels Airport junction to Mechelen along the E19
- The line from Schiphol Airport along the A4 and A10 motorways to Amsterdam
- The Noord-Zuid metro line along the s116 Nieuwe Leeuwarderweg through Amsterdam-Noord
- The Essen Stadtbahn along the Ruhrschnellweg
- The Øresund Line along the E20 south of Malmö
- The Docklands Light Railway between Beckton Park station and Cyprus station uses the median of the A1020 road in east London.
- The Manchester Metrolink between Ashton-under-Lyne and Ashton Moss runs along the A6140. It also runs through the roundabout.
- The Moscow Metro Sokolnicheskaya line between Filatov Lug and Potapovo runs in the median of Solntsevo – Butovo – Varshavskoe highway road

=== North America ===
==== Canada ====
- The Line 1 Yonge–University along Allen Road in northwest Toronto, Ontario, Canada
- The Mascouche line along the median of the A 640 between Repentigny and Mascouche. Quebec, Canada.
- The Red Line of Calgary's CTrain light rail network is partially located in the median strip of the Crowchild Trail
- The ION in Kitchener-Waterloo is partially located in the median strip of King Street and Charles Street.

==== United States ====
- The Baltimore Metro Subway along a portion of I-795 in Baltimore County
- Union Pacific through Tulsa, Oklahoma in the median of the Broken Arrow Expressway, between downtown and Interstate 44
- The Chicago Transit Authority's Red and Blue lines in the median of the Dan Ryan Expressway, the Kennedy Expressway, and Eisenhower Expressway in Chicago
- The H Line (RTD) built in the median of Interstate 225 from Interstate 25 to north of Parker Road in the Denver, Colorado metro area
- The Hardy Toll Road in Houston, Texas, has a rail line running down the median for a significant portion of its length.
- The JFK Airtrain is an elevated train along the median of Interstate 678 in Queens, New York; it runs north from John F. Kennedy International Airport before turning east at Jamaica Avenue
- The New Mexico Rail Runner on the median of Interstate 25 from CP Hondo into the state capital of Santa Fe, New Mexico
- The Red Line (MARTA) built in the median of Georgia 400 between the northern Atlanta neighborhood, Lindbergh, Atlanta and Sandy Springs, Georgia
- The TriMet MAX Red Line light rail runs in the median of Interstate 205 in Maywood Park, Oregon.
- Union Pacific's main line through Austin, Texas, runs on the median of the MoPac Expressway. The highway is named for the now defunct Missouri Pacific.
- The Orange Line and the Silver Line west of Washington, D.C. following Interstate 66 and Virginia State Route 267 between Fairfax and Loudoun County, and Arlington, Virginia
- The BNSF main line and Amtrak Coast Starlight and Cascades services between Seattle and Portland, OR use trackage in the median of Interstate 5 just north of Woodland, Washington.
- The SEPTA Market–Frankford Line briefly runs in the median of the Delaware Expressway after it emerges from the Market Street Tunnel before continuing along Front Street.

California

- Parts of Bay Area Rapid Transit outside San Francisco:
  - Yellow Line (including eBART) along California State Route 24 and California State Route 4
  - Blue Line along Interstate 238 and Interstate 580
  - MacArthur station, a cross-platform interchange station where three lines meet in the median of State Route 24
- The Los Angeles Metro Rail
  - The C Line runs in the median of Interstate 105 for majority of its length.
  - The A Line runs in the median of Interstate 210 in Pasadena.
- Metrolink
  - The San Bernardino Line runs in the median of Interstate 10 between Interstate 710 and El Monte.
  - The Orange County Line, Inland Empire–Orange County Line, and Amtrak's Pacific Surfliner run in the median of Interstate 5 north of Oceanside, California.
    - North County Transit District's Coaster also uses this median segment to access the Coaster yard at the north end of the segment. NCTD owns the right-of-way.
- The VTA Blue Line runs for much of its length in the medians of California State Route 87 and California State Route 85.
- SacRT light rail Blue Line runs in the median of Interstate 80 and includes park and ride facilities at most of the stations in this section.

=== Oceania ===
- The Yanchep and Mandurah railway lines in Perth, Australia, are set up like this. The former is mainly located in the median of the Mitchell Freeway. The latter line has its northern section in the median of the Kwinana Freeway while its southern section is located in Mandjoogoordap Drive. The Ellenbrook line travels up the median strip of the Tonkin Highway for some of its length.

=== South America ===
- The Santiago Metro Line 2 in Chile along the Pan American Highway

City planners also commonly use median strips to accommodate urban tram tracks along a central segregated track, and examples of this layout are found across Europe. Some of the earliest practices of incorporating central tramways into road designs were pioneered in Liverpool by John Alexander Brodie, and later emulated in Manchester, such as along Princess Parkway or Kingsway.

== See also ==
- Lane
- Motorway service area
- Rest area
- Road surface marking
- Shoulder (road)
- Traffic lane
