= Olkhovaya (Moscow Metro) =

Moscow Metro station

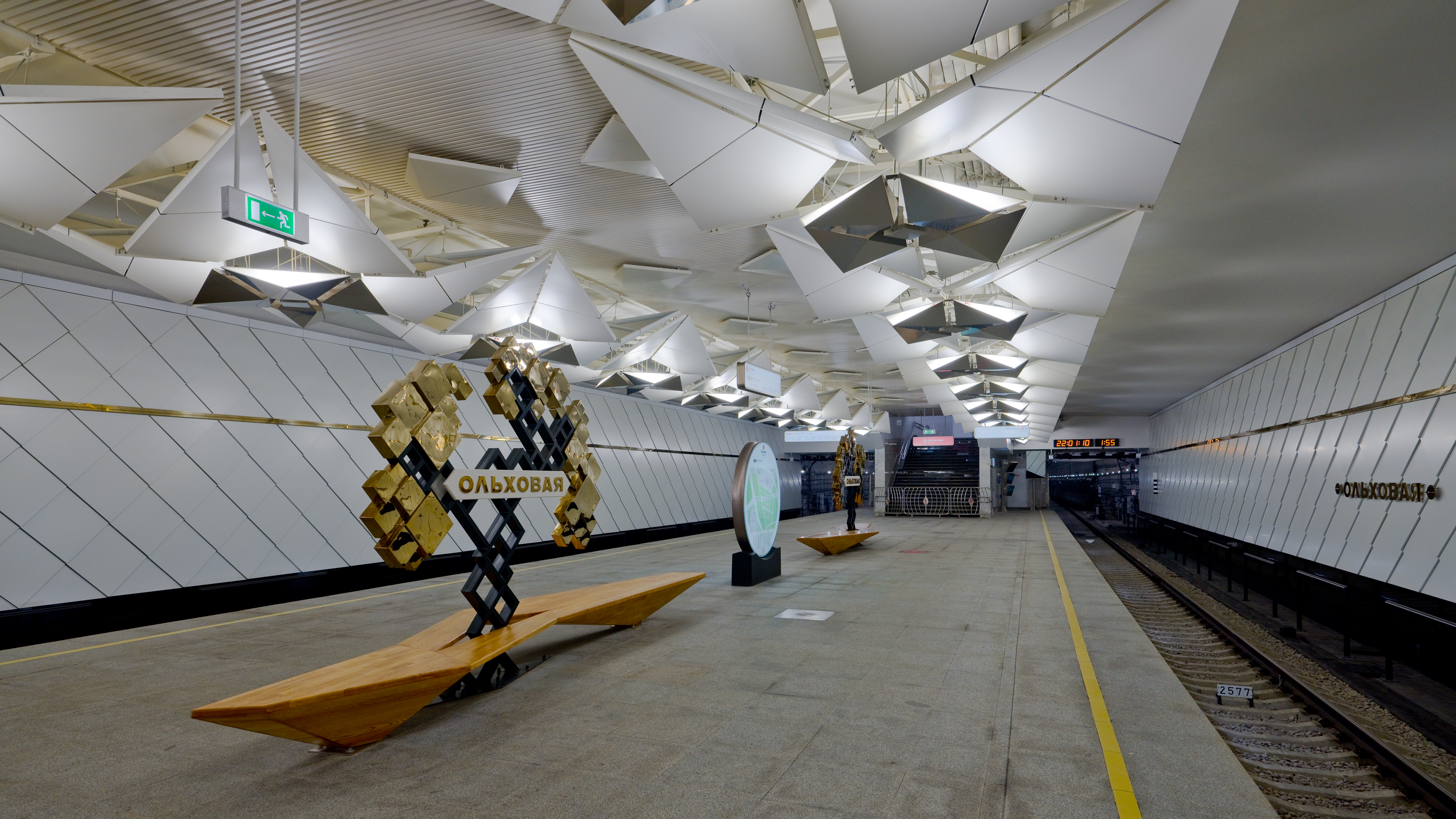

General information
- Location: Sosenskoye Settlement; Novomoskovsky Administrative Okrug; Moscow; Russia
- Coordinates: 55.5686°N 37.4594°E
- System: Moscow Metro station
- Owner: Moskovsky Metropoliten
- Line: Sokolnicheskaya line
- Platforms: 1 island platform

Construction
- Structure type: Covered, underground

History
- Opened: 20 June 2019

Services
Preceding station	Moscow Metro	Following station
Novomoskovskaya towards Potapovo	Sokolnicheskaya line	Prokshino towards Bulvar Rokossovskogo
Route map
Location

Olkhovaya (Russian: Ольховая) is a Moscow Metro station on the Sokolnicheskaya line. It was opened on 20 June 2019, as part of an extension that included Kommunarka, Prokshino, and Filatov Lug.

== Design ==
Overall, the station features a tree-inspired theme.

With white square tiles placed in "square diamond" positions, the walls of Olkhovaya station somewhat resemble Profsoyznaya metro station. However, the bottom edges are slightly pocking from the walls: this pattern resembles tree cones.

The station's hall (not on photo) has amber-like mosaic featuring trees in autumn (with yellow/orange leaves).

The lights have a similar source of tree-relates inspiration, resembling "winged" seeds of trees.

The very name of the station comes from "Olkha", Russian word for alder.

=== Overground ===
The overground part of the station features a medium-sized park (paved roads and designer benches) and a large parking lot.

== Role for "New Moscow" areas ==
Said station is adjacent to Kaluzhskoe shosse highway and has a parking lot for car-to-metro interchanging. Thanks to various bus stops (various routes available) highway bus riders can interchange to Moscow Metro without dealing with MKAD-related rush hour traffic jams as well.

- Unlike many other out-of-Moscow highways, Kaluzhskoe Shosse highway does not have a railroad "double" to offer an undisturbed public transport alternative to the highway. The highway is disturbed by severely congested MKAD. And nowadays, Line 1 serves as the alternative, the "double" to avoid the constant traffic jam.
