= Novomoskovsky =

Novomoskovsky (masculine), Novomoskovskaya (feminine), or Novomoskovskoye (neuter) may refer to:

- Novomoskovsky Administrative Okrug, an administrative okrug of Moscow, Russia
  - Novomoskovskaya (Sokolnicheskaya line) metro station (formerly called Kommunarka)
  - Novomoskovskaya (Troitskaya line), future metro station
- Novomoskovsky District, a district of Tula Oblast, Russia
- Novomoskovsky (rural locality), a rural locality (a khutor) in Voronezh Oblast
- Novomoskovskoye, a rural locality (a selo) in Chelyabinsk Oblast

== See also ==
- Novomoskovsk (disambiguation)
