= Filatov Lug (Moscow Metro) =

Moscow Metro station

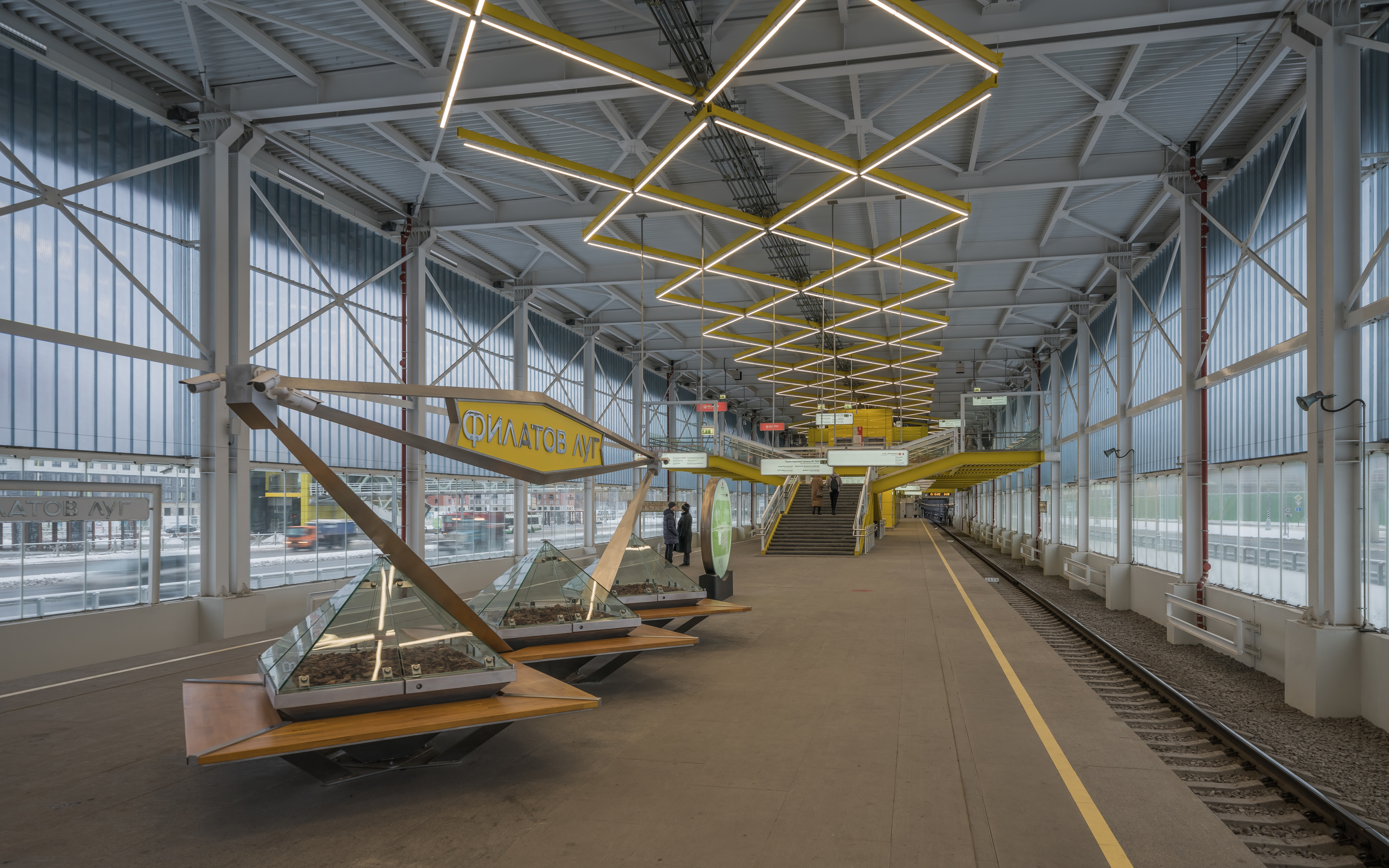

General information
- Location: Sosenskoye Settlement, Novomoskovsky Administrative Okrug; Moscow; Russia
- Coordinates: 55.6013°N 37.4077°E
- System: Moscow Metro station
- Owner: Moskovsky Metropoliten
- Line: Sokolnicheskaya line
- Platforms: 1 island platform

Construction
- Structure type: Covered, aboveground

History
- Opened: 20 June 2019

Services
Preceding station	Moscow Metro	Following station
Prokshino towards Potapovo	Sokolnicheskaya line	Salaryevo towards Bulvar Rokossovskogo
Route map
Location

Filatov Lug (Russian: Филатов Луг, lit. Filatov's Meadow) is a Moscow Metro station on the Sokolnicheskaya line. It was opened on 20 June 2019, as part of an extension that included Kommunarka (now Novomoskovskaya), Prokshino, and Olkhovaya.
