= Rumyantsevo (Moscow Metro) =

Moscow Metro station

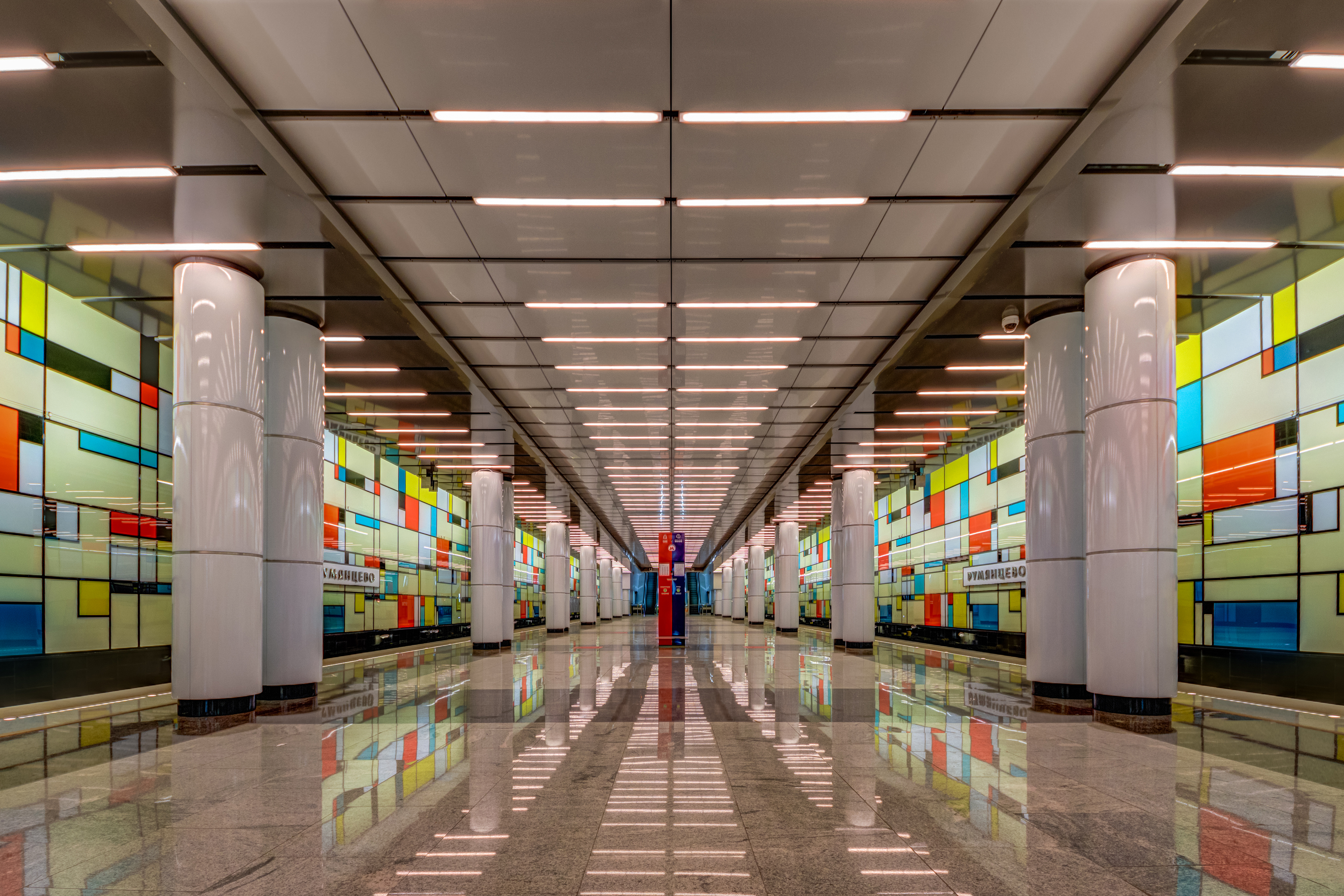

General information
- Location: Moskovsky Settlement; Novomoskovsky Administrative Okrug; Moscow; Russia
- Coordinates: 55.6330°N 37.4419°E
- System: Moscow Metro station
- Owner: Moskovsky Metropoliten
- Line: Sokolnicheskaya line
- Platforms: 1 island platform
- Tracks: 2

Construction
- Platform levels: 1

History
- Opened: 18 January 2016; 10 years ago

Services
Preceding station	Moscow Metro	Following station
Salaryevo towards Potapovo	Sokolnicheskaya line	Troparyovo towards Bulvar Rokossovskogo
Route map
Location
- Location within Moscow Metro

Rumyantsevo (Russian: Румянцево) is the station on the Moscow Metro's Sokolnicheskaya Line between Troparyovo and Salaryevo. It was the 199th station on the Metro when it opened on January 18, 2016. Rumyantsevo served as the terminus of the line until Salaryevo opened on 15 February 2016.

== Location ==
It is in Moskovsky Settlement, Novomoskovsky Administrative Okrug, which became part of the city of Moscow in 2012. The station is at the intersection of Kiyevskoye Highway and Rodnikovaya Ulitsa.

Rumyantsevo is the first metro station in the outlying area known as “New Moscow” and one of the few stations lying beyond the Moscow Ring Road. Its name comes from the prior village of Rumyantsevo, which was absorbed into Moscow.

== Construction and design ==
Work on the first tunnel from Salaryevo began in August 2013. Tunneling of the second tunnel began in October 2013. The city initially projected an opening date sometime in 2014. Construction crews completed tunneling in October 2014.

In April 2014, during construction, workers found a small cache dating from the 16th century that included several vessels and some jewelry.

The city completed installation of the stations's escalators in January 2015.

The station has two underground lobbies and entrances on both sides of Kievskaya Highway. An unusual feature is the second level above the platform which is used for the service and technical area. These areas are generally at the ends of the station. The interior is decorated with colorful tiles in the abstract style of Piet Mondrian.
