= Troparyovo =

Moscow Metro station

Troparyovo Тропарёво
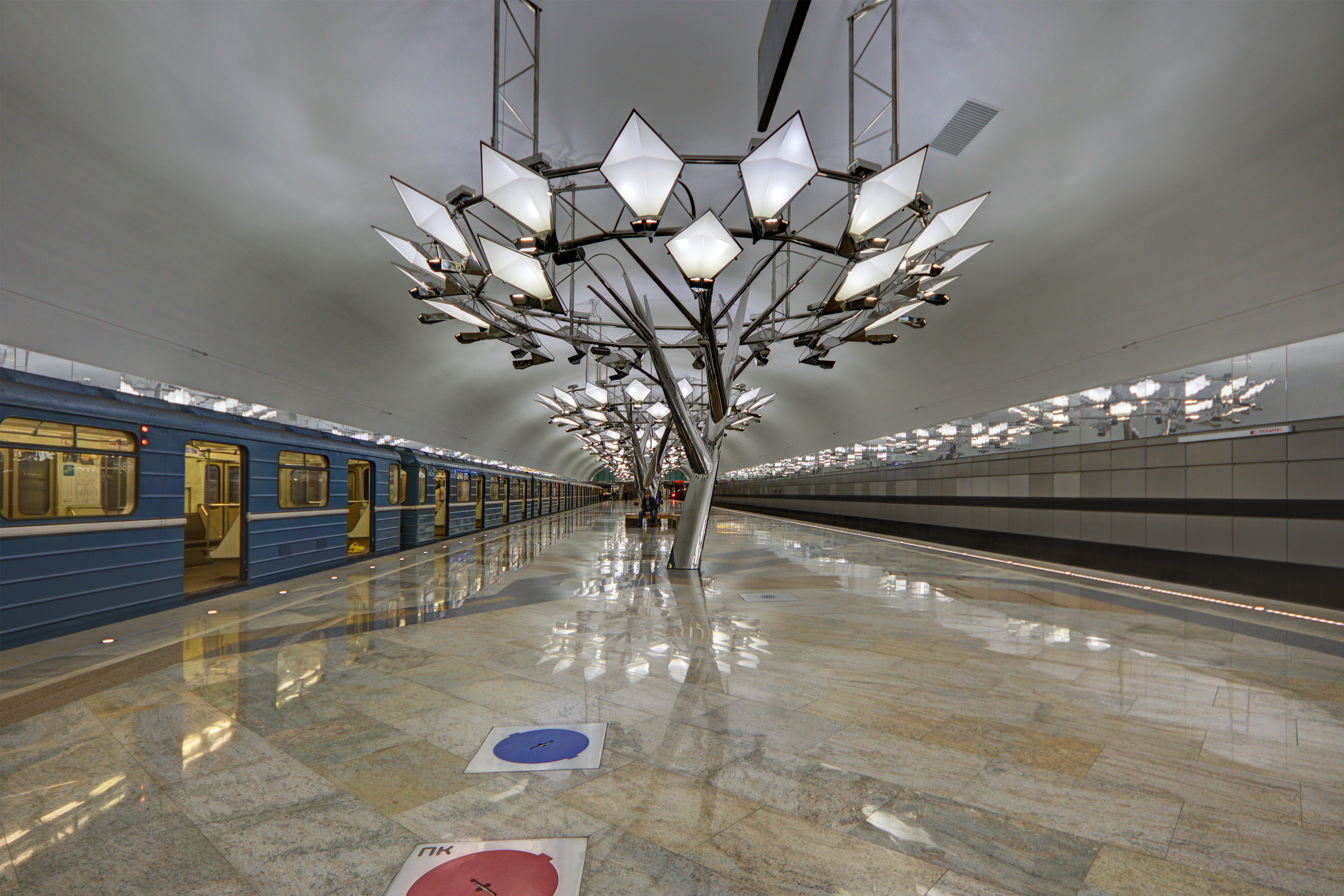

General information
- Location: Troparyovo-Nikulino District; Western Administrative Okrug; Moscow; Russia
- Coordinates: 55.6459°N 37.4725°E
- System: Moscow Metro station
- Owner: Moskovsky Metropoliten
- Line: Sokolnicheskaya line
- Platforms: 1 island platform
- Tracks: 2

Construction
- Structure type: Shallow single-vault
- Depth: 12 metres (39 ft)
- Platform levels: 1
- Parking: No
- Accessible: yes

History
- Opened: 8 December 2014; 11 years ago

Services
Preceding station	Moscow Metro	Following station
Rumyantsevo towards Potapovo	Sokolnicheskaya line	Yugo-Zapadnaya towards Bulvar Rokossovskogo
Route map
Location
- Location within Moscow Metro

Troparyovo (Russian: Тропарёво) is a station on the south-western part of the Moscow Metro's Sokolnicheskaya Line. It opened on 8 December 2014 and served as the line terminus until 18 January 2016. It comes next after Yugo-Zapadnaya, the previous terminus of the line until 2014. Two stations beyond Troparyovo, Rumyantsevo and Salaryevo were opened in 2016. It features an example of modern bionic architecture: there are artificial, shiny metal "trees" with lights forming "leaves", allowing the station's ceiling to stay untouched and smooth.

== Name ==
The station is named after the Troparyovo microdistrict, which, in turn, inherited its name from the village standing here before the expansion of Moscow.

== Location ==
The station is located in the southwestern part of Moscow, at the intersection of Leninsky Avenue and Ruzskaya Street, at the border between Tyoply Stan and Troparyovo-Nikulino districts.

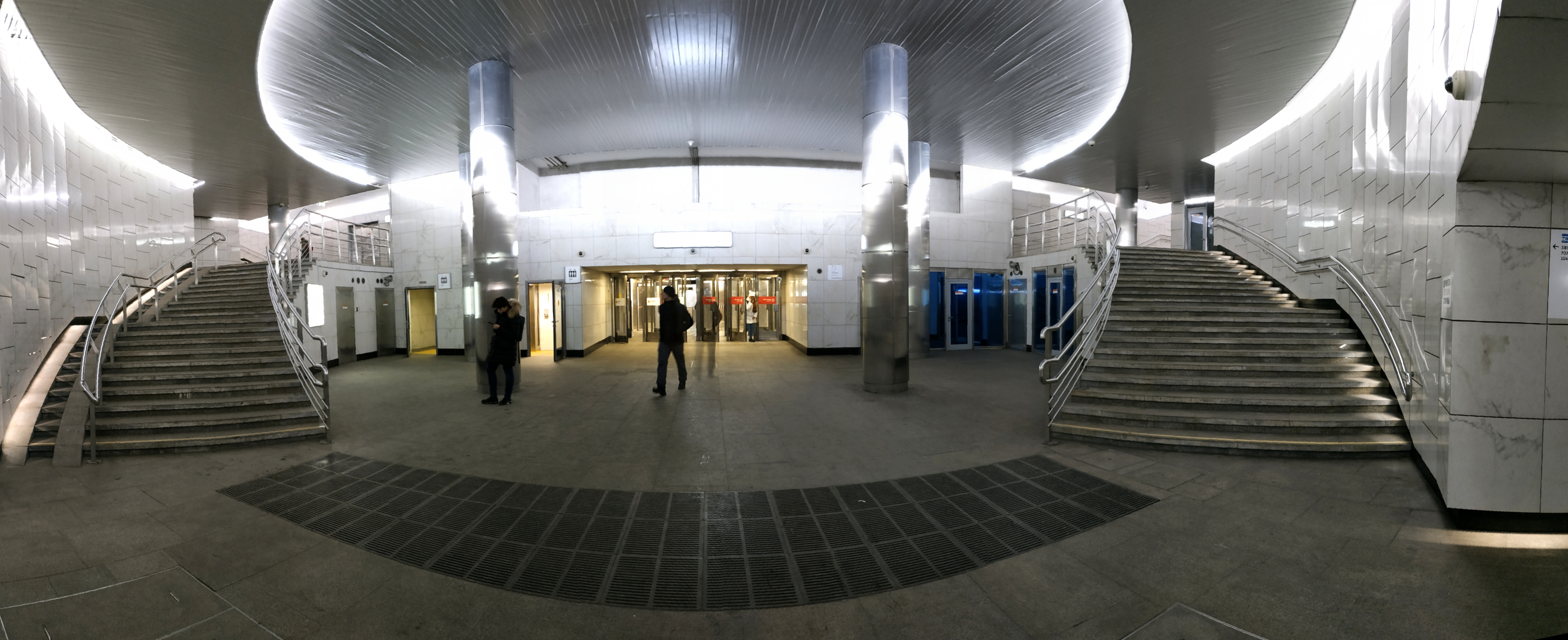
Underground vestibule
