= Salaryevo (Moscow Metro) =

Moscow Metro station

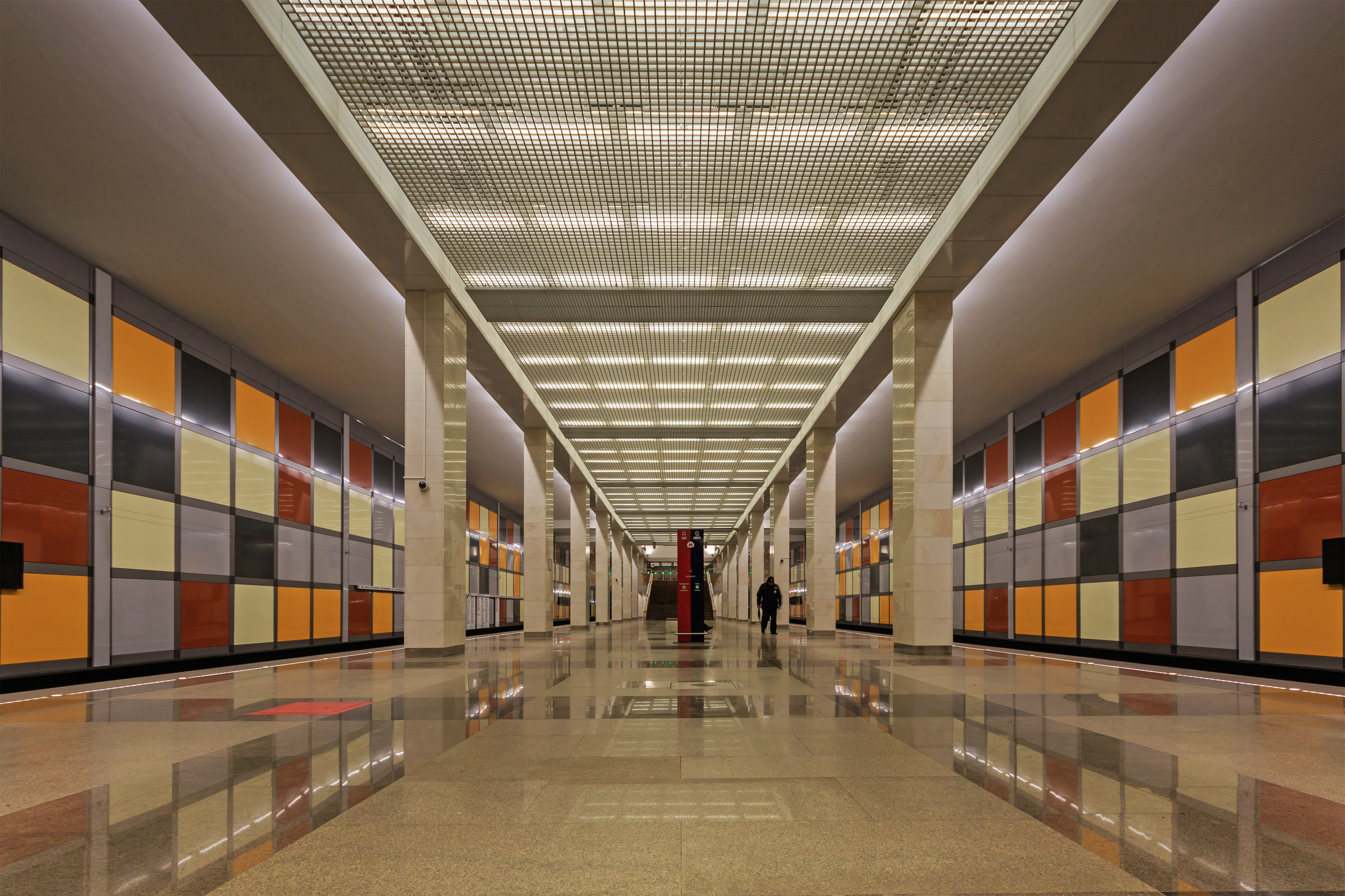

General information
- Location: Moskovsky Settlement; Novomoskovsky Administrative Okrug; Moscow; Russia
- Coordinates: 55.6227°N 37.4240°E
- System: Moscow Metro station
- Owner: Moskovsky Metropoliten
- Line: Sokolnicheskaya line
- Platforms: 1 island platform
- Tracks: 2

Construction
- Platform levels: 1

History
- Opened: 15 February 2016; 10 years ago

Services
Preceding station	Moscow Metro	Following station
Filatov Lug towards Potapovo	Sokolnicheskaya line	Rumyantsevo towards Bulvar Rokossovskogo
Route map
Location
- Location within Moscow Metro

Salaryevo (Russian: Саларьево) is a Moscow Metro station on the Sokolnicheskaya line. It opened on 15 February 2016 and was the southwestern terminus of the line, between Rumyantsevo and Filatov Lug stations. Salaryevo became the 200th station of the Moscow Metro.

The station is south of the Kiyevskoye Highway, in Moskovsky Settlement, Novomoskovsky Administrative Okrug. This is the second metro station in the okrug between Rumyantsevo and Filatov Lug. It serves residents of the "New Moscow" expansion area, about three kilometers from the town of Moskovsky.

== Name ==
It is named after the village of Salaryevo, which existed here until Moscow was expanded to the southwest in 2012.

== Construction ==
The city began construction on Salaryevo and Rumyantsevo in 2014 with plans to open the stations by the end of 2015. As a result of problems installing the communications system, the city pushed completion into 2016. The station ultimately opened on February 15, 2016.

A train yard was opened next to the station as well.
