= Sokolnicheskaya line =

Line of the Moscow Metro

Overview
- Locale: Moscow
- Termini: Potapovo (southwest); Bulvar Rokossovskogo (northeast)
- Stations: 27

Service
- Type: Rapid transit
- System: Moscow Metro
- Operator(s): Moskovsky Metropoliten
- Rolling stock: 81-717.5M/714.5M; 81-740.1/741.1; 81-765/766/767; 81-765.4/766.4/767.4

History
- Opened: 15 May 1935; 91 years ago
- Last extension: 2024

Technical
- Line length: 47 kilometres (29 mi)
- Character: At-grade, underground, and elevated
- Track gauge: 1,520 mm (4 ft 11 27/32 in)
- Electrification: Third rail

The Sokolnicheskaya line (Russian: Соко́льническая ли́ния, IPA: [sɐˈkolʲnʲitɕɪskəjə ˈlʲinʲɪjə], formerly Kirovsko-Frunzenskaya (Ки́ровско-Фру́нзенская) (Line 1; Red Line) is a line of the Moscow Metro in Moscow, Russia. It opened in 1935 and is the oldest line of the Moscow Metro system. There are currently 27 stations open on the line. As of 2024, the line is 47 kilometres (29 mi) long and is the longest line in the Moscow Metro.

== History ==
As the line was the first formal one in the system, its history of development coincides with the history of the Moscow Metro's first stage altogether. In short, it was to cut Moscow on a northeast-southwest axis beginning at Sokolniki Park and continuing through the Three railway terminals and then past the city centre's main traffic junctions: Red gate junction, Kirovskaya, the Lubyanka and the Manege Squares. From there, a separate branch carried off into the Arbat Street and later Kiyevsky railway station, before it became in 1938 the distinct Arbatsko-Pokrovskaya line and, later, in 1958, the Filyovskaya line. The remaining part of the Frunzenskaya Branch ran along the Kremlin's western wall past the Russian State Library to the future site of the Palace of the Soviets on the bank of the Moskva River and terminated near Gorky Park.

Although the Moscow Metro prides itself on the best Stalinist architecture and the earlier Art Deco attempts, the stations of the first stage are very far from these points. Instead, they have a very classical taste to them, which blends nicely with the neo-classical atmosphere of the mid-1930s. It is also true that the overall construction of these early stations allowed the palaces of the 1940s and 1950s to evolve from them. Most of these stations are now officially listed as architectural heritage.

Further development was seen in the latter half of the 1950s during the construction of the Frunzensky radius. The line extended into the Khamovniki District in 1957 coming up to Luzhniki Stadium and then in 1959 reached the Moscow State University on the Sparrow Hills. This required crossing the Moskva river on a combined auto and Metro bridge including a station on it. However, due to the necessity of reconstruction in 1984, the station was closed, and not reopened until 2002. The Frunzensky radius was completed in 1964 upon the last extension into the new bedroom communities along the Vernadsky Avenue of southwestern Moscow.

At the opposite end, there were two extensions: one in 1965 across the Yauza River (also via an open bridge) to Preobrazhenskaya Square, and another in 1990 into the Bogorodskoye District.

=== Recent developments and future plans ===
Presently the line has the oldest structures in operation, and thus several renovations have been carried out systematically. Recent changes include a second entrance to Kropotkinskaya in 1998, major lighting enhancements to Okhotny Ryad and Kropotkinskaya.

In the south, Metro completed an extension of the line from Yugo-Zapadnaya in 2016, adding Troparyovo in December 2014, Rumyantsevo in January 2016, and Salaryevo in February 2016. Metro is an 11.6 km extension to the town of Kommunarka on June 20, 2019, with the construction of four stations: Filatov Lug, Prokshino, Olkhovaya, and Kommunarka (later renamed Novomoskovskaya). Novomoskovskaya has allowed transfers to the Troitskaya line in 2023 (later delayed to 2024). The city released initial station designs for Olkhovaya and Kommunarka in December 2017 and set an initial completion date in 2019. A transfer to the Bolshaya Koltsevaya line at Prospekt Vernadskogo opened on 7 December 2021 and a transfer to Sokolniki opened on 1 March 2023. The extension from Novomoskovskaya to Potapovo opened on 5 September 2024. An extension from Potapovo to Shcherbinka to transfer to the Butovskaya line at Ulitsa Gorchakova is planned after 2023.

Planned extensions in the north are hampered by the position of Cherkizovskaya and Bulvar Rokossovskogo which were built so as to become a part of the projected second ring line that has been in planning since the 1960s. Cherkizovskaya's tunnels have provisions for a second perpendicular station, that would allow the line to continue eastwards to the district of Golyanovo and meet the Arbatsko-Pokrovskaya line at Shchyolkovskaya. Such an extension, however, is not scheduled in the current official development programme. The stations of a possible extension to Shchyolkovskaya and Vostochny would be Amurskaya, Shchyolkovskaya, Krasnoyarskaya and Vostochnaya. Beyond Bulvar Rokossovskogo, there will be an extension to Kholomogorskaya that is planned to be completed in 2032 with an intermediate station called MGSU.

On 20 June 2019, the line was extended along the territory of New Moscow from Salaryevo to Novomoskovskaya. On 5 September 2024, the line was extended from Novomoskovskaya to Potapovo.

=== Timeline ===
Segment	Date opened	Length
Sokolniki–Park Kultury	15 May 1935	8.4 km
Park Kultury–Sportivnaya	1 May 1957	2.4 km
Sportivnaya–Universitet	12 January 1959	4.5 km
Universitet–Yugo-Zapadnaya	30 December 1963	4.5 km
Sokolniki–Preobrazhenskaya Ploshchad	31 December 1965	2.5 km
Preobrazhenskaya Ploshchad–Bulvar Rokossovskogo	3 August 1990	3.8 km
Vorobyovy Gory (after reconstruction)	14 December 2002	N/A
Yugo-Zapadnaya–Troparyovo	8 December 2014	2.1 km
Troparyovo–Rumyantsevo	18 January 2016	2.5 km
Rumyantsevo–Salaryevo	15 February 2016	1.8 km
Salaryevo–Novomoskovskaya	20 June 2019	11.6 km
Novomoskovskaya–Potapovo	5 September 2024	2.5 km
Total	27 stations	47 km

=== Name changes ===
Station	Previous name(s)	Years
Krasnye Vorota	Krasniye Vorota	1935–1962
Krasnye Vorota	Lermontovskaya	1962–1986
Chistye Prudy	Kirovskaya	1935–1990
Lubyanka	Dzerzhinskaya	1935–1990
Okhotny Ryad	Okhotny Ryad	1935–1955
Okhotny Ryad	Imeni L.M. Kaganovicha	1955–1957
Okhotny Ryad	Okhotny Ryad	1957–1961
Okhotny Ryad	Prospekt Marksa	1961–1990
Kropotkinskaya	Dvorets Sovetov	1935–1957
Park Kultury	Tsentralny Park Kultury i Otdykha Imeni Gorkogo	1935–1980
Vorobyovy Gory	Leninskie Gory	1959–1999
Bulvar Rokossovskogo	Ulitsa Podbelskogo	1990–2014
Novomoskovskaya	Kommunarka	2019–2024

== Transfers ==
Transfer to	At
Zamoskvoretskaya line	Okhotny Ryad
Arbatsko-Pokrovskaya line	Biblioteka Imeni Lenina
Filyovskaya line	Biblioteka Imeni Lenina
Koltsevaya line	Komsomolskaya, Park Kultury
Kaluzhsko-Rizhskaya line	Chistye Prudy
Tagansko-Krasnopresnenskaya line	Lubyanka
Serpukhovsko-Timiryazevskaya line	Biblioteka Imeni Lenina
Lyublinsko-Dmitrovskaya line	Chistye Prudy
Bolshaya Koltsevaya line	Prospekt Vernadskogo, Sokolniki
Troitskaya line	Novomoskovskaya

== Rolling stock ==
Two depots are assigned to the line, the TCh-1 Severnoye and the TCh-13 Cherkizovo. Starting in 1997, both depots have been upgrading to the new 81-717.5M/714.5M trains (all factory fresh). Currently all carriages of the old Ezh, Ezh-1, Em-508 and Em-509 have been retired.

When the line opened in 1935, trainsets included only four cars. By the middle of the 20th century, trainsets expanded to seven cars. In 2018, the Metro became extending trains of Cherkizovo depot to eight cars. This will add additional capacity to the system of more than 186,000 passengers per day.

Subway car types used on the line over the years:

Type	Dates
Series A, B	1935 - 1951
Series V	1946 - 1958
Series D	1956 - 1986
Series E	1966 - 2002
Series Ezh, Em-508 and Em-509	1970 - 2008
Series 81-717.5M/714.5M	1997—present
Series 81-717.5A/714.5A	2010—present
Series 81-740.1/741.1	2020—present
Series 81-765/766/767	2020—present
Series 81-765.4/766.4/767.4	2019—present
