= Novomoskovsk =

Novomoskovsk may refer to:

- Novomoskovsk, Russia, a city in Tula Oblast
  - Novomoskovsk Urban Okrug, the municipal formation which this city is incorporated as
- Samar, Ukraine, formerly known as Novomoskovsk, a town in Dnipropetrovsk Oblast
- Russian submarine K-407 Novomoskovsk, a Russian Navy submarine

== See also ==
- Novomoskovsky (disambiguation)
