= Novomoskovskaya (Sokolnicheskaya line) =

Moscow Metro station

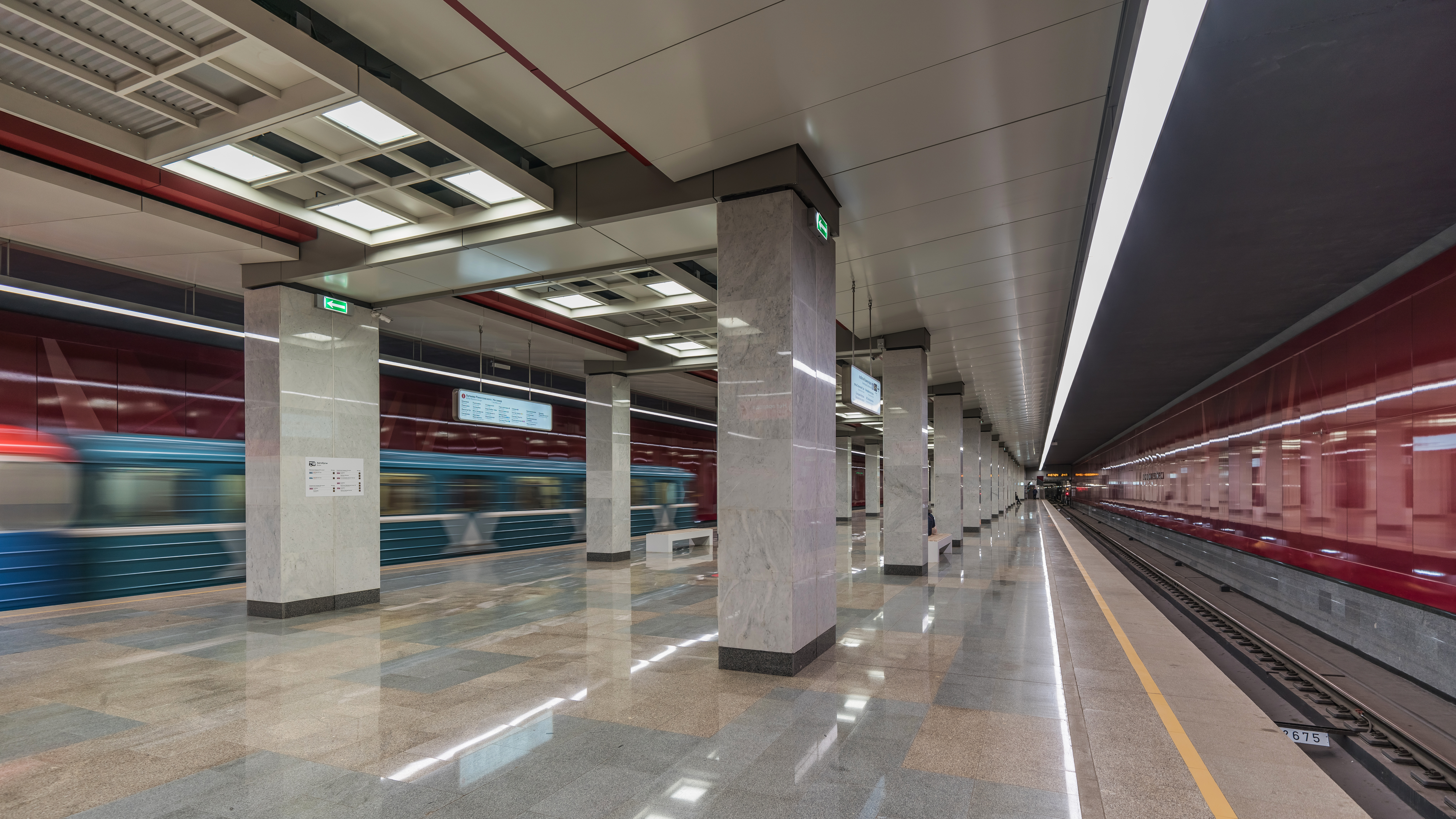

General information
- Location: Kommunarka, Sosenskoye Settlement, Novomoskovsky Administrative Okrug; Russia
- Coordinates: 55.5605°N 37.4696°E
- System: Moscow Metro station
- Owner: Moskovsky Metropoliten
- Line: Sokolnicheskaya line
- Platforms: 1 island platform
- Tracks: 2

Construction
- Platform levels: 1

History
- Opened: 20 June 2019

Services
| Preceding station | Moscow Metro | Following station |
|---|---|---|
| Potapovo Terminus | Sokolnicheskaya line | Olkhovaya towards Bulvar Rokossovskogo |
| Terminus | Troitskaya line transfer at Novomoskovskaya | Kommunarka towards Novatorskaya |
Location

Novomoskovskaya (Russian: Новомоско́вская), formerly known as Kommunarka (Russian: Коммунарка) is a Moscow Metro station on the Sokolnicheskaya line. It was opened on 20 June 2019, along with Filatov Lug, Prokshino, and Olkhovaya., is located between Olkhovaya and Potapovo stations. Novomoskovskaya became the 232nd station of the Moscow Metro. On 28 December 2024, a transfer on the Troitskaya line was opened.

It is in the Kommunarka area of Sosenskoye Settlement in the Novomoskovsky Administrative Okrug southwest of Moscow.

== History ==
The city government decided to extend the line to Stolbovo in February 2016; an unexpected decision given that the city initially planned to extend the line only to Filatov Lug. The initial cost of the line was about 45 billion rubles. In July 2017, the city government confirmed that the extension would move forward, allowing construction to continue.

In March 2017, the city began clearing space around the planned station to accommodate the construction.

The station's working name during most of construction was Stolbovo. This derived from the former village of Stolbovo, which became part of the current settlement when it was incorporated into the City of Moscow from Moscow Oblast. In July 2024, the station was renamed from Kommunarka to Novomoskovskaya in order not be confused with the future Novomoskovskaya station on the Troitskaya line.

== Design and layout ==
Kommunarka is at the intersection of the Solntsevo-Butovo-Varshavskoye shosse highway and the Ostafyevo International Business Airport section of the Moscow Ring Road. It has two lobbies, one that exits across the highway via an underground pedestrian walkway, and a second that leads to the eponymous station on the Troitskaya line.
