= Kommunarka =

Kommunarka Коммунарка
- Urban-type settlement
- Sosenskoye Settlement in Moscow
- Interactive map of Kommunarka
- Location of Kommunarka Kommunarka (Moscow)
- Coordinates: 55°33′52″N 37°28′03″E
- Country: Russia
- Federal subject: Moscow
- Elevation: 173 m (568 ft)

Population (2010 Census)
  - Total: 5,223
  - Estimate (2010): 5,223 (0%)
- Postal code: 108814

Kommunarka is an urban-type settlement (posyolok) in Sosenskoye Settlement, Novomoskovsky Administrative Okrug, Moscow, Russia. The Kommunarka (Sokolnicheskaya line) station opened in 2019.

== History ==
A mass burial site of the late 1930s, known as the Kommunarka shooting ground or "firing range". is also located in the area. Most of the defendants at the third and last Moscow Show Trial (March 1938) are buried there.
