= Kaluzhskaya (closed) =

Former metro station in Moscow, Russia

Kaluzhskaya Калужская

General information
- Coordinates: 55.6584°N 37.5455°E
- System: Moscow Metro station
- Owner: Moskovsky Metropoliten
- Line: Kaluzhsko-Rizhskaya line
- Platforms: 1
- Tracks: 2

Construction
- Structure type: Ground-level
- Platform levels: 1

History
- Opened: 15 April 1964; 62 years ago
- Closed: 12 August 1974; 52 years ago
Route map
Location
- Location within Moscow Metro

Kaluzhskaya (Russian: Калужская) was a temporary station of the Moscow Metro on the Kaluzhsko-Rizhskaya Line and was in operation from 1964 to 1974. It was housed in the then easternmost bay of the Kaluzhskaya Depot in southwestern Moscow and was replaced by the current Kaluzhskaya station which was opened in 1974. It is one of two abandoned stations on the Moscow Metro (the other one being the old Pervomayskaya station). The depot building was later expanded eastward; one of the former platform tracks has been removed, the other houses trains at night, and the platform is used as a storage room.
