= Potapovo (Moscow Metro) =

Moscow Metro station, Line 1

Potapovo Потапово
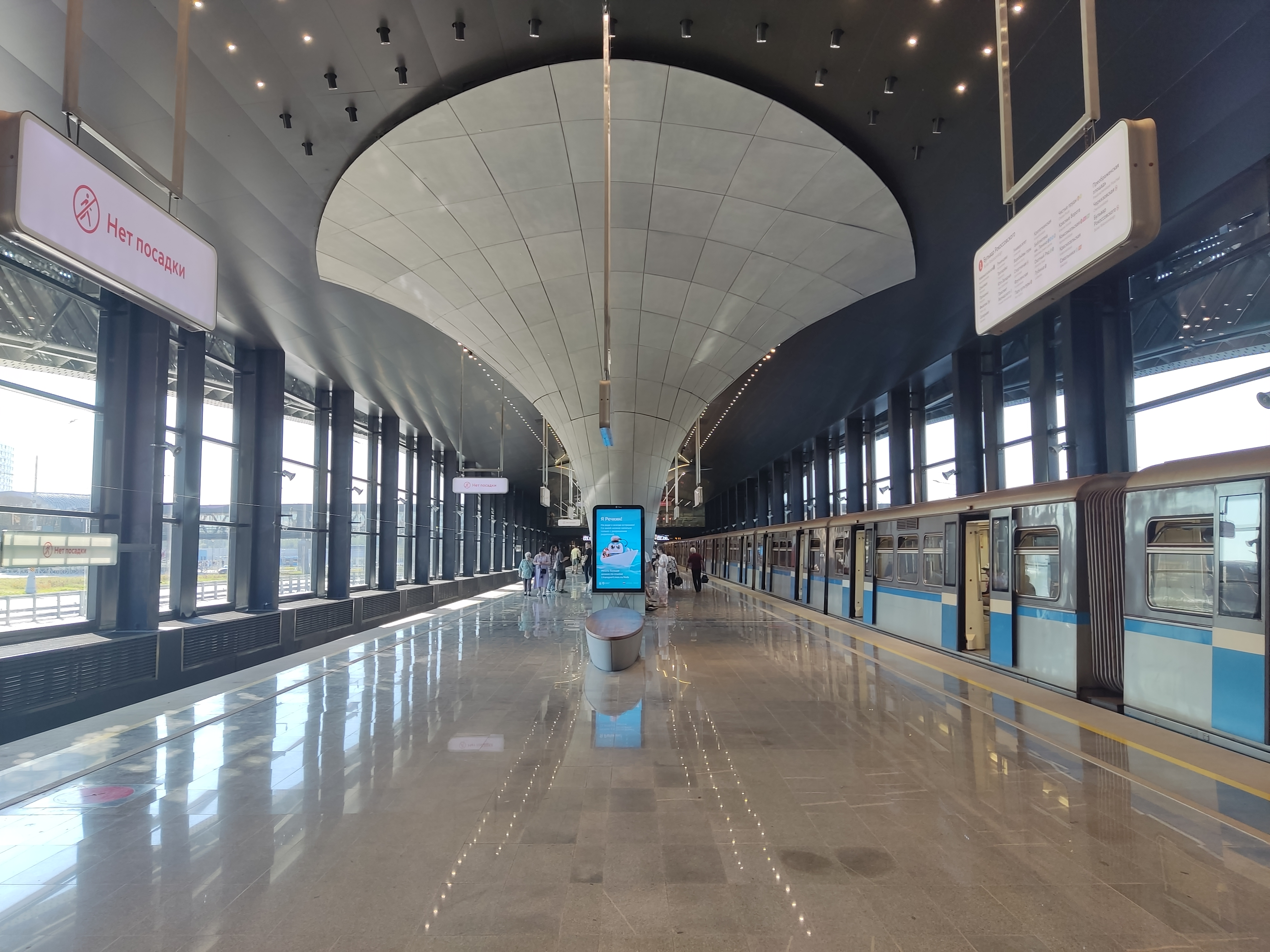

General information
- Location: Sosenskoye Settlement; Novomoskovsky Administrative Okrug; Moscow; Russia
- Coordinates: 55.5526°N 37.4931°E
- Line: Sokolnicheskaya line

History
- Opened: September 5, 2024; 2 years ago

Services
| Preceding station | Moscow Metro | Following station |
|---|---|---|
| Terminus | Sokolnicheskaya line | Novomoskovskaya towards Bulvar Rokossovskogo |
Route map
Location
- Location within Moscow Metro

Potapovo (Russian: Потапово) (Note: The station had also been previously named "Novomoskovskaya".) is a station on the Sokolnicheskaya line of the Moscow Metro, in the Sosenskoye Settlement of the Novomoskovsky Administrative Okrug. The station is being constructed one stop past Novomoskovskaya, the former southwestern terminus of the Sokolnicheskaya line. It is the new southwestern terminus of the line.

Potapovo is designed as a heated ground station, and is scheduled to be the first such station in the Moscow Metro. Its design calls for double-glazed windows and extra insulation to help keep the station warm. The station is being built in the middle of the Solntsevo–Butovo–Varshavskoye Highway. Pedestrian overpasses are planned to allow passengers to exit the station on either side of the highway.

Potapovo's design is said to look like a spaceship. The design of the station's platform and exterior incorporates plastic forms. A sculpture by artist Dashi Namdakov is planned to be featured in the station.

The construction is being managed by Mosinzhproekt. The station first appeared in plans for the Moscow Metro in 2018. Potapovo was initially scheduled to open in 2020, but later plans projected an opening in 2024. By the end of 2022, it was estimated to be about 60 percent complete. The project completed and the station opened on 5 September 2024. The station is one of twenty Moscow Metro stations planned to be opened in New Moscow by 2032. (Note: Eight of these twenty Moscow Metro stations opened in New Moscow between 2012 and 2022.)

== Gallery ==
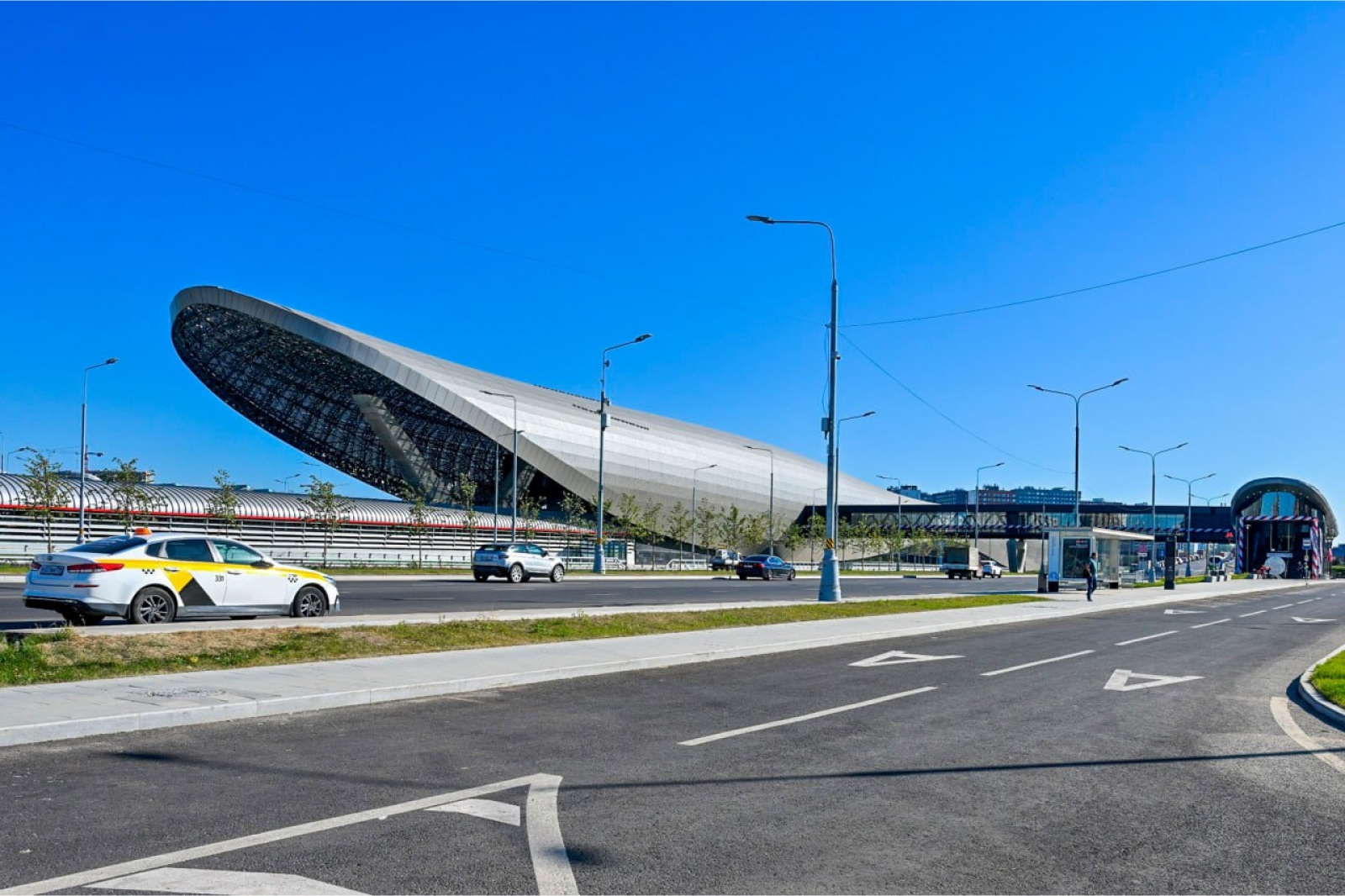

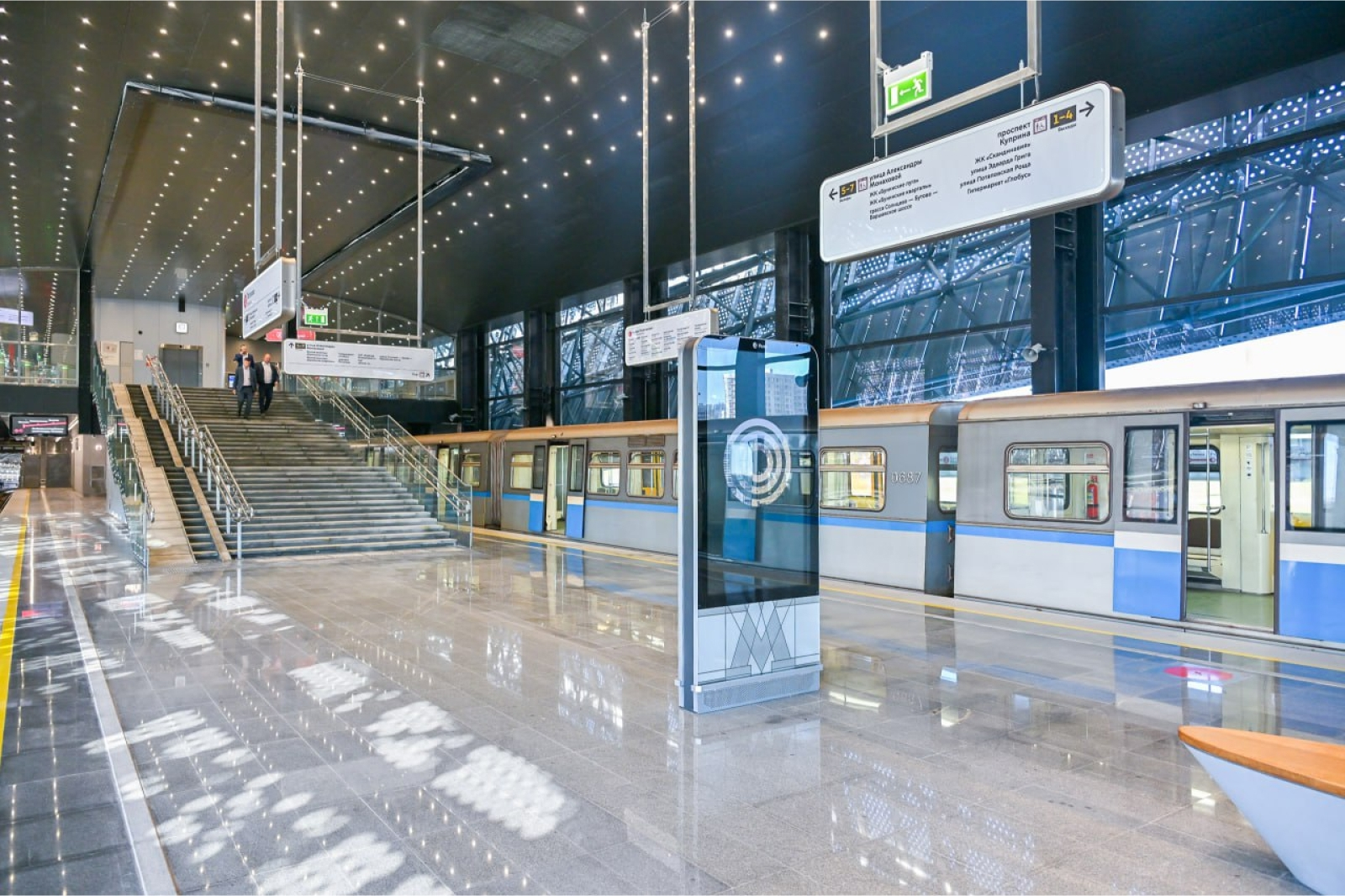

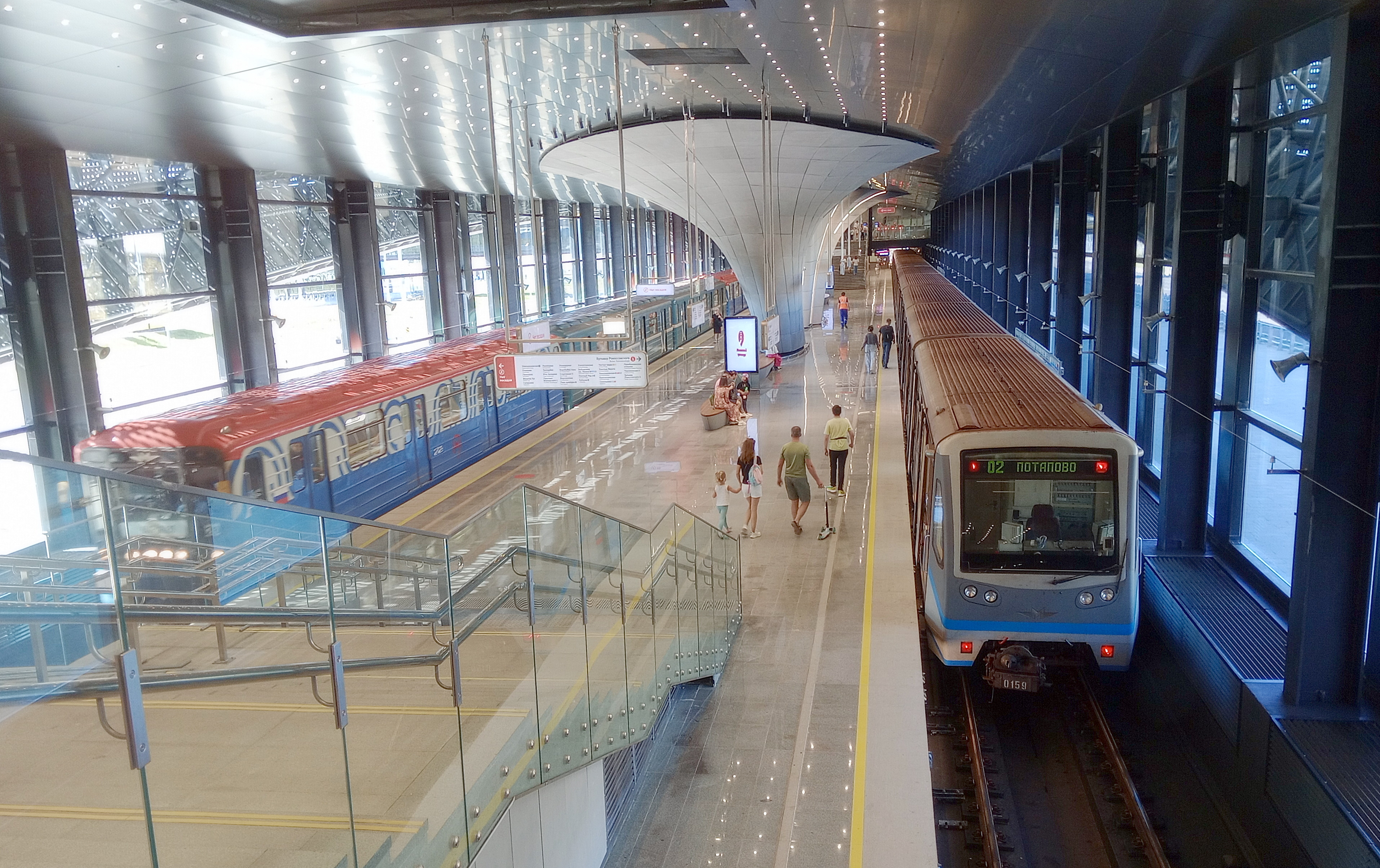
