= Bulvar Rokossovskogo (Sokolnicheskaya line) =

Moscow Metro station

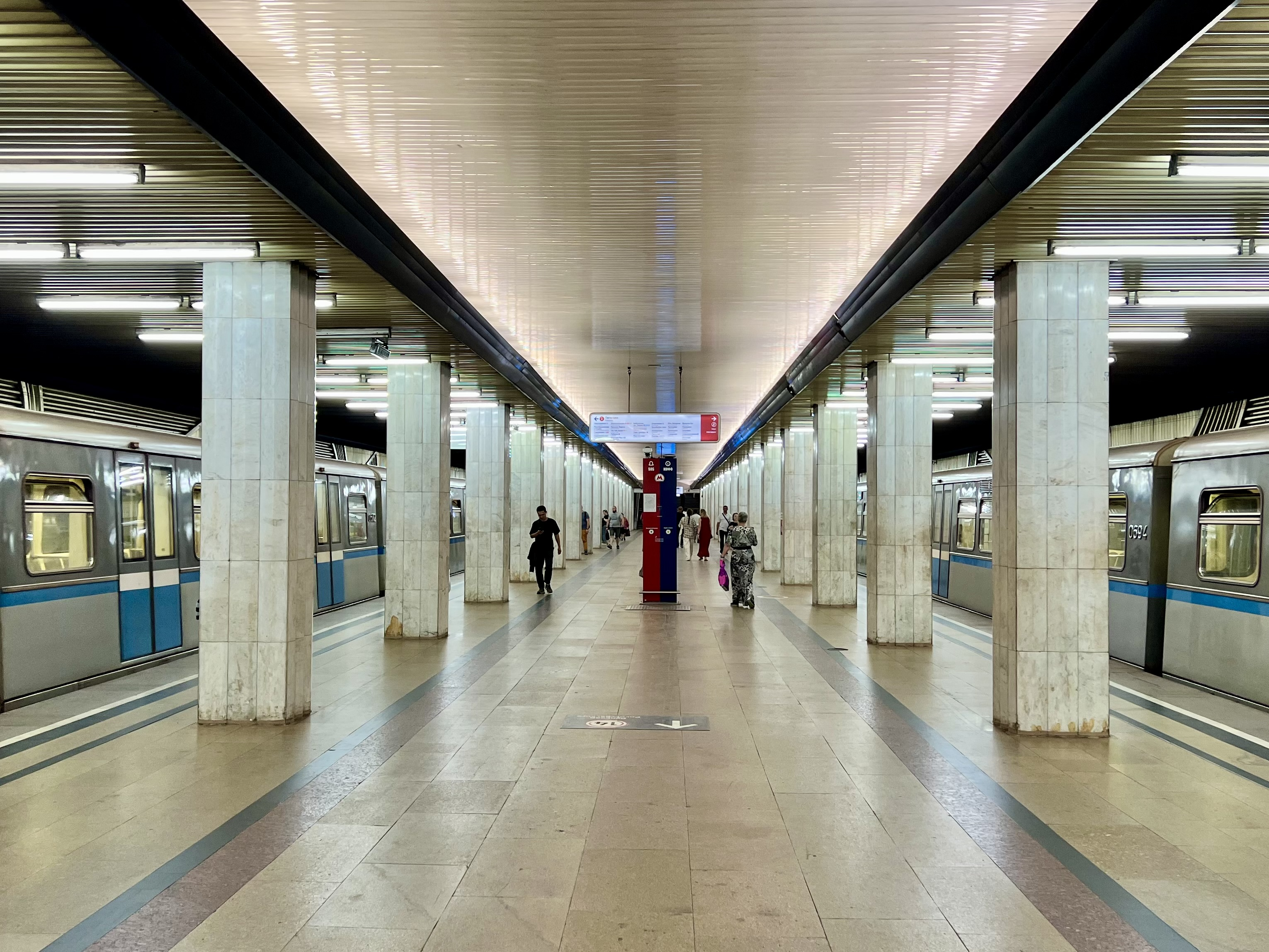

General information
- Location: Bogorodskoye District; Eastern Administrative Okrug; Moscow; Russia
- Coordinates: 55.8148°N 37.7342°E
- System: Moscow Metro station
- Owner: Moskovsky Metropoliten
- Line: Sokolnicheskaya line
- Platforms: 1 island platform
- Tracks: 2
- Connections: Bus: 3, 75, 80, 86, 265, 775, 822; Tram: 2, 4, 7, 13, 29, 33, 36, 46

Construction
- Structure type: Shallow column triple-vault
- Depth: 8 metres (26 ft)
- Platform levels: 1

Other information
- Station code: 001

History
- Opened: 1 August 1990; 36 years ago
- Former names: Ulitsa Podbelskogo

Services
Preceding station	Moscow Metro	Following station
Cherkizovskaya towards Potapovo	Sokolnicheskaya line	Terminus
Out-of-station interchange
Preceding station	Moscow Metro	Following station
Belokamennaya anticlockwise / outer	Moscow Central Circle transfer at Bulvar Rokossovskogo	Lokomotiv clockwise / inner
Route map
Location
- Location within Moscow Metro

Bulvar Rokossovskogo (Russian: Бульва́р Рокоссо́вского, English: Rokossovsky Boulevard), previously Ulitsa Podbelskogo (Russian: У́лица Подбе́льского, English: Podbelsky Street), is a Moscow Metro station in the Bogorodskoye District, Eastern Administrative Okrug, Moscow, Russia. It is on the Sokolnicheskaya line, serving as its eastern terminus. The station was opened in 1990. Riders may make an out-of-station transfer to Bulvar Rokossovskogo on the Moscow Central Circle line.

== History ==
=== Name ===
The station was originally named "Ulitsa Podbelskogo" for Podbelskogo Street, which was named for the Bolshevik revolutionary Vadim Podbelsky. Even after the street was renamed in 1991 to Ivanteyevskaya Street, the station's name was unchanged until 2014. On 10 April 2014 Moscow City Commission on Names recommended renaming the station to "Bulvar Marshala Rokossovskogo", for Rokossovsky Boulevard, which was named for Soviet and Polish Marshal Konstantin Rokossovsky. On 8 July, the station was officially renamed to "Bulvar Rokossovskogo".

=== Future plans ===
Rather than continuing the straight path of the Sokolnicheskaya line to the northeast, Bulvar Rokossovskogo was built to the northwest of Cherkizovskaya, forming a right angle with the rest of the line. This would allow Bulvar Rokossovskogo to eventually become part of a planned second ring line around the city, at which time the Sokolnicheskaya line could presumably be further extended in its original direction.

Beyond Bulvar Rokossovskogo are reversal sidings which are planned to become part of the future "Big Ring" line. A junction between Bulvar Rokossovskogo and Cherkizovskaya is used by southbound trains entering and leaving the Cherkizovo depot (No. 13), since the depot is directly connected only to the southbound tunnel.

== Design ==
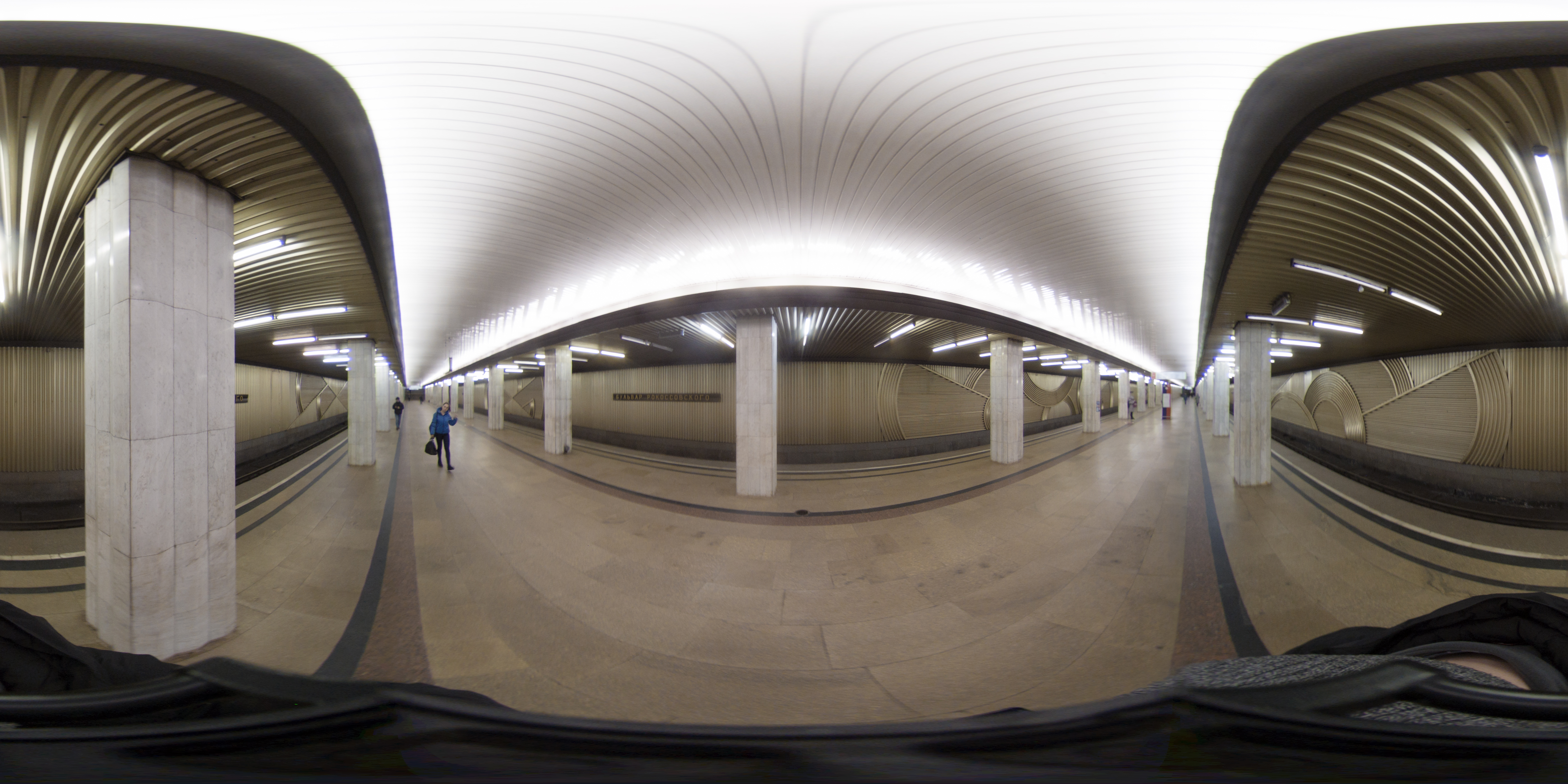
Station interior (view as a 360° interactive panorama)

Bulvar Rokossovskogo is a shallow column tri-vault station. The station was designed by architects Nina Aleshin and Natalya K. Samoilova and applied the following theme: ferroconcrete pillars faced with white marble; anodized aluminum arranged in geometric patterns on the walls and two identical entrance vestibules located on either side of Moscow's Circular Railway near the Otkrytoe Shosse.
