= Novomoskovsky Administrative Okrug =

Novomoskovsky Administrative Okrug Новомосковский административный округ
- Administrative okrug of Moscow
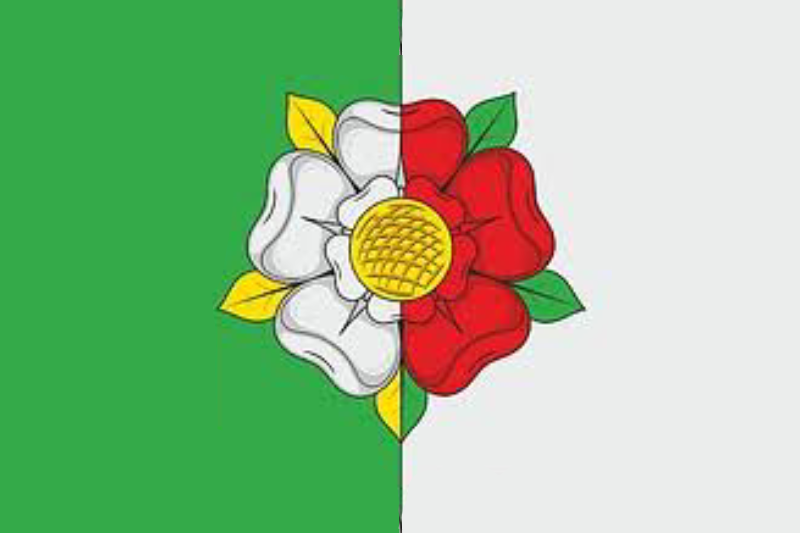
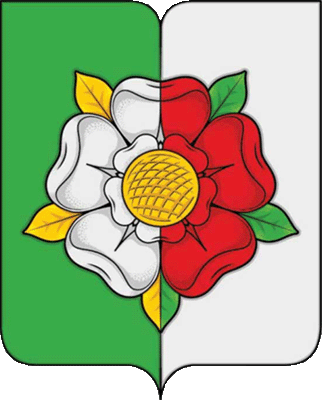
- Flag Coat of arms
- Novomoskovsky Administrative Okrug in Moscow
- Country: Russia
- Federal city: Moscow
- Settlements: 11

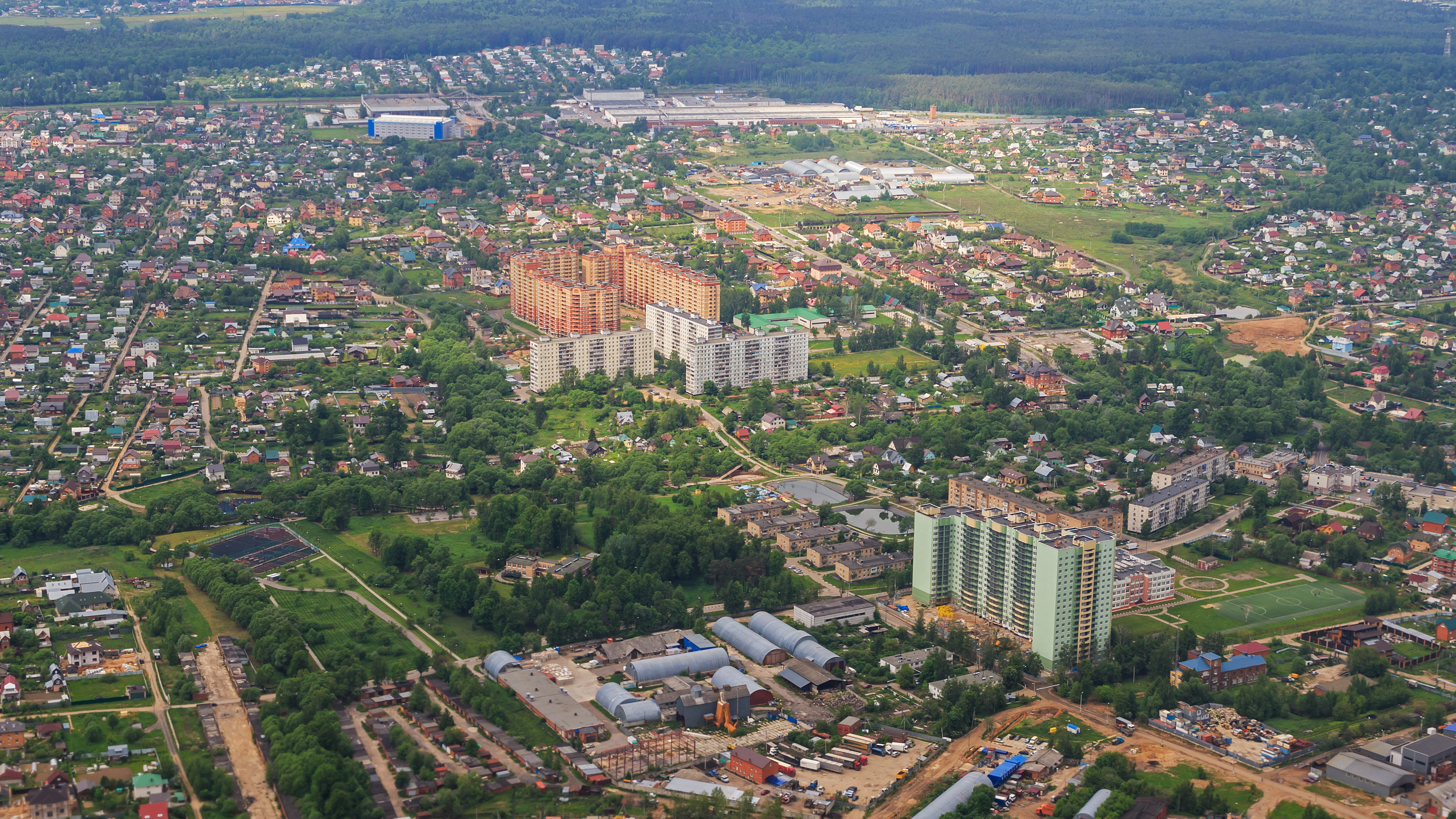

Novomoskovsky Administrative Okrug (Russian: Новомосковский административный округ) is one of the twelve administrative okrugs of Moscow. The okrug was created on July 1, 2012.

The administrative center of Novomoskovsky Administrative Okrug is the town of Moskovsky.

== Territorial organisation ==
At the time of formation it included the following 11 settlements, which previously belonged to Leninsky, Naro-Fominsky, and Podolsky Districts of Moscow Oblast:

- Moskovsky Settlement
- Shcherbinka Settlement
- Kokoshkino Settlement
- Desyonovskoye Settlement
- Filimonkovskoye Settlement
- Marushkinskoye Settlement
- Mosrentgen Settlement
- Ryazanovskoye Settlement
- Sosenskoye Settlement
- Vnukovskoye Settlement
- Voskresenskoye Settlement
