= 2010 Moscow Metro bombings =

Islamist terror attacks in Moscow, Russia

- Part of Insurgency in the North Caucasus, Terrorism in Russia and Islamic terrorism in Europe
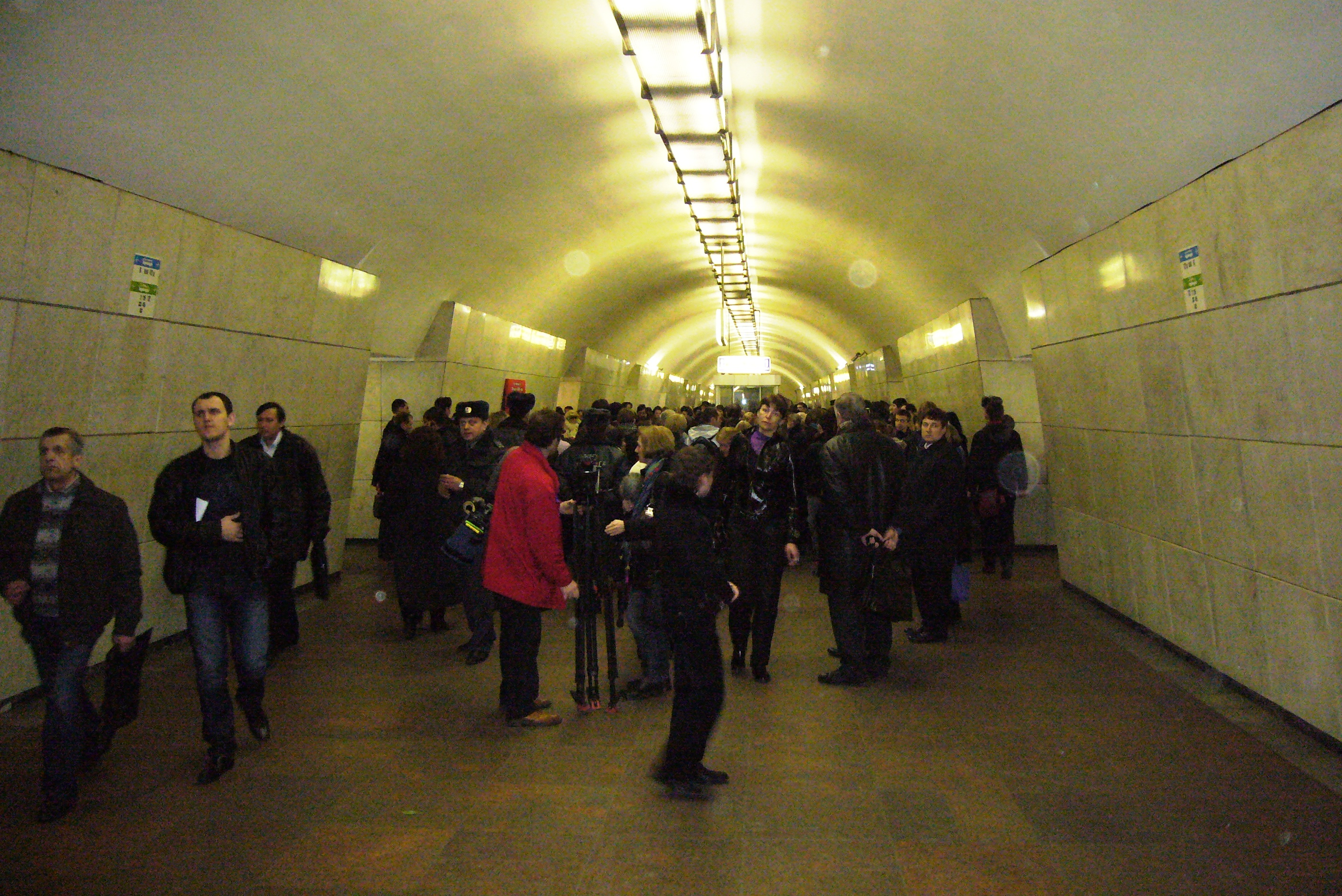
- Central hall of the Lubyanka station the day after the bombings
- Location: Moscow, Russia
- Date: March 29, 2010; 7:56/7:57 MSD and 8:37/8:39 MSD (UTC+4)
- Target: Moscow Metro
- Attack type: Suicide bombings
- Weapon: Hexogen explosives
- Deaths: 38
- Injuries: 102
- Perpetrator: Caucasus Emirate
- No. of participants: 2 women

The 2010 Moscow Metro bombings were suicide bombings carried out by two female Islamic terrorists during the morning rush hour of March 29, 2010, at two stations of the Moscow Metro (Lubyanka and Park Kultury), with roughly 40 minutes in between. At least 40 people were killed, and over 100 injured.

Russian officials called the incident "the deadliest and most sophisticated terrorist attack in the Russian capital in six years", a reference to the Avtozavodskaya and Rizhskaya bombings in 2004. At the time of the attacks, an estimated 500,000 people were commuting through Moscow's metro system.

Initial investigation indicated that the bombings were perpetrated by the militant Islamist Caucasus Emirate group. On March 31, Caucasus Emirate leader Doku Umarov claimed responsibility for ordering the attacks in a video released on the internet. He also stated that such attacks in Russia would continue unless Russia grants independence to Muslim states in the North Caucasus region. The man who brought the suicide bombers to Moscow was arrested in July 2010. The Anti-Terror Committee of Russia confirmed in August 2010 that Magomedali Vagabov, along with four other militants, was killed in an operation in Dagestan. He is believed to be a militant behind the bombings, a close associate of Doku Umarov and the husband of Mariam Sharipova, one of the two suicide bombers.

== Background ==
The bombings were the latest in a series of attacks in Russia since 1994, many attributed to Chechen militants or to the Caucasus Emirate. Since 1999, Chechen separatists gradually shifted away from a pro-western approach of the Chechen Republic of Ichkeria, becoming strongly influenced by Salafi beliefs which placed them at odds not only with Russia and Pro-Russia Chechen President Ramzan Kadyrov, but also with a Dagestani population with strong Sufi traditions. A mujahideen group claim they are fighting a "holy war", and wish to create an "Emirate" in the Caucasus. Over 5,000 people have been killed and wounded in the Caucasus since 2002.

== Suicide bombings ==
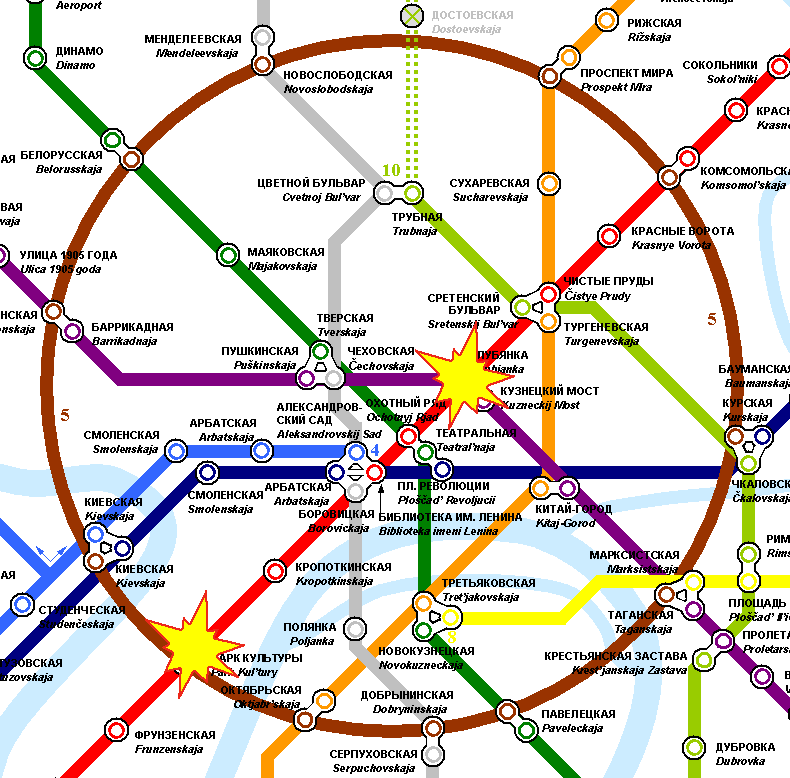
Locations of the attacks on a metro map

The first explosion occurred on the Red Arrow – 75 years train at the Lubyanka station at approximately 7:56 am local time (03:56 UTC). The train started from Yugo-Zapadnaya, and stopped at Lubyanka station. Once the train doors opened, explosives worn by a woman standing at the second carriage's second exit detonated. The explosive had a force of up to 1.5 kg of trinitrotoluene (TNT). Fifteen people on board the train, and eleven people on the platform, were killed. One victim from the third carriage died from a head injury caused by an 8 mm (0.31 in) piece of metal.

A second explosion at the Park Kultury station followed at approximately 8:38 am, caused by another female, who at the time of the first explosion was riding another train from Yugo-Zapadnaya towards Ulitsa Podbelskogo station in the same direction as the first train. At the time of first explosion, the second train had stopped in the tunnel between Frunzenskaya and Park Kultury stations. It was announced over the speakers that due to technical problems, the train would have to unload the passengers at the next stop. About 40 minutes later, the train reached the station, and once its doors opened, the second female suspect detonated the second explosion, killing fourteen commuters. Panic included stampedes at both stations, as commuters attempted to escape. The second attack was carried out by a dark-haired woman with the equivalent of 2 kg of TNT strapped to her waist. Both bombs were packed with metal nuts, bolts and screws, to increase the destructive impact of the blasts.

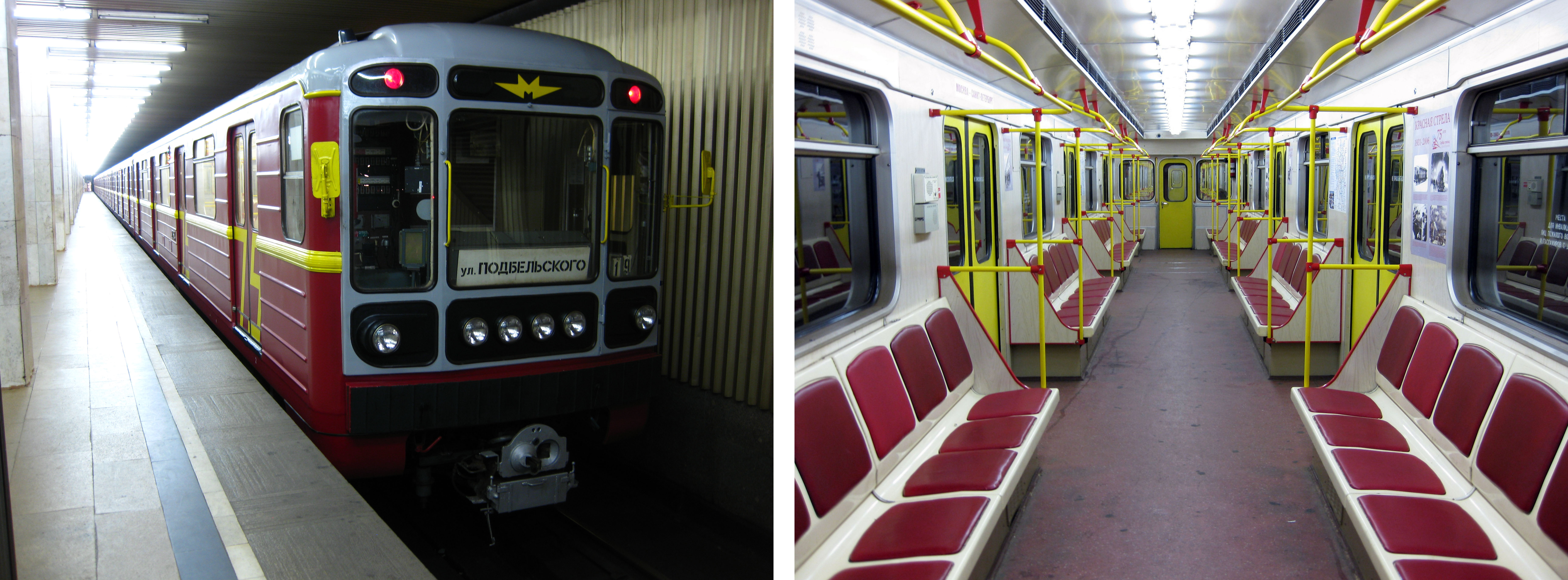
The Red Arrow – 75 years train upon its first launch

The two women who carried out the attacks wore explosive belts, presumably using detonation devices set inside their mobile phones and activated by a call to self. The attackers intended to strike during peak hours on a weekday when the subway would be at capacity. Eyewitnesses said that some survivors were so badly injured that they constantly splashed heavy amounts of blood on the floor and walls, until they were attended to by doctors.

Alexander Bortnikov, the FSB chief, said its investigation pointed to "terrorist groups related to the North Caucasus".

=== Casualties ===
Casualty statistics
Nationality	Deaths	Hospitalized
Russia	37	75
Tajikistan	3	1
Malaysia	–	3
Philippines	–	1
Kyrgyzstan	–	1
Israel	–	1
Unidentified	–	3
Total	40	85

Citizenship of those killed and wounded was updated by the Ministry of Emergency Situations.

Forty people, aged between 16 and 65, were killed in the explosions. This counts a victim who died of her injuries on March 30. This figure was revised upwards from an earlier count of 36 killed, that had consisted of 24 people in the explosion at the Lubyanka station and 12 at Park Kultury. Two other people died in the resulting stampede at both the stations after the blast. Three of the dead were minors.

A high-ranking official of the Black Sea Fleet of the Russian Federation, Captain Viktor Ginkut, was also amongst the passengers killed at Park Kultury station. His residential registry in Sevastopol, Ukraine has raised the question of his actual nationality, but the Ministry of Foreign Affairs of Russia refused to comment on it.

Over 100 other passengers sustained mild to serious injuries. Five of the injured passengers remained in critical condition for an extended period.

=== Subsequent false alarms ===
A third reportedly failed detonation was announced by Life News roughly 40 minutes later, aimed at one of the two Prospekt Mira stations; however, no explosives were found in the plastic bag, after it was taken from the station. Around 10:04 am local time a call from a public phone announcing another planned explosion was made to the Begovaya station staff, but the caller soon revealed it to be a hoax.

Another hoax occurred about an hour after the second explosion at the Ulitsa Podbelskogo station when passengers noticed a Muslim woman entering the train.

== Aftermath ==
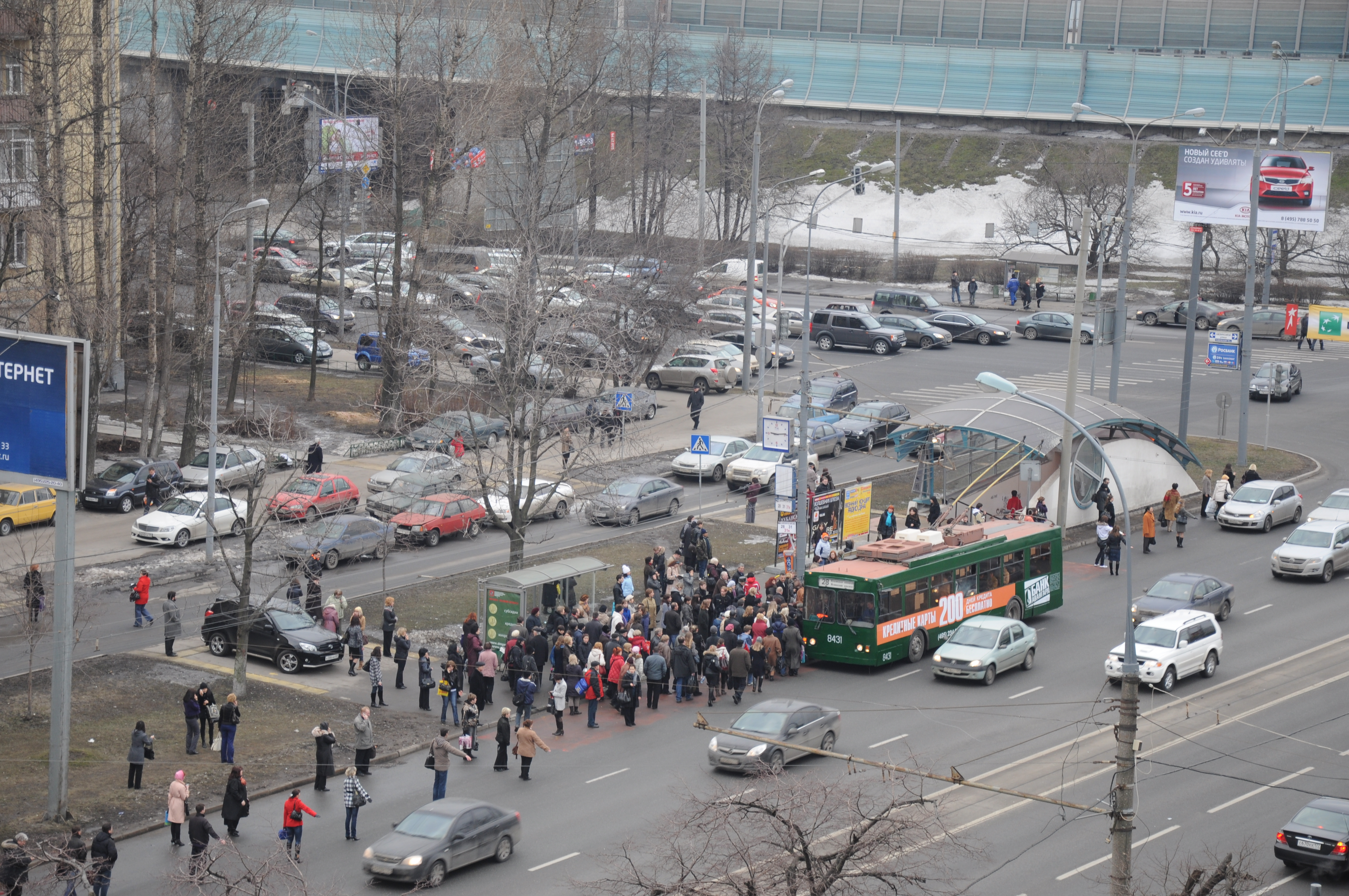
Overcrowded surface public transport lines on the day of the bombings

Russian television carried little coverage of the attacks for the first hour after the first explosion took place (at 7:57 am). Commentators have criticised this, alleging that it spread more panic and led to citizens feeling helpless.

Around 11:00 am local time, a special operation was launched to patrol all the subway stations in search of possible clues to trace the instigators. Squads of local police performed passport control at every station of the Sokolnicheskaya Line.

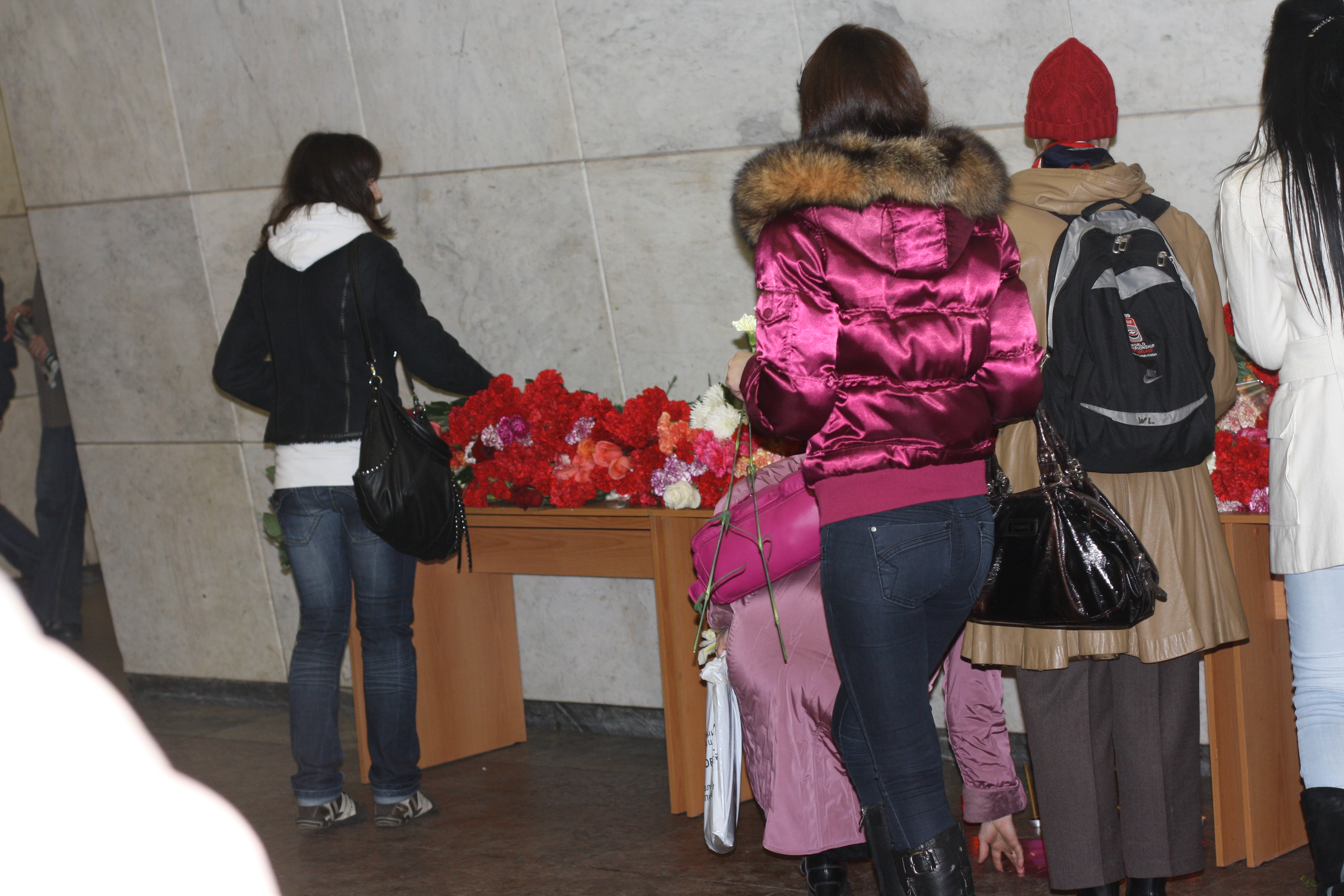
Commuters leave flowers at the Lubyanka station

March 30 was declared a nationwide Day of Mourning. Prime Minister Vladimir Putin issued a decree ordering the allocation from the Reserve Fund of 300,000 rubles (approx. US$11,000) to the families of those killed in the bombings, plus 18,000 rubles for funeral expenses, and of 50,000–100,000 rubles to those who were injured in the attacks, depending on the severity of their injuries.

Authorities announced that due to upcoming Easter (Paskha), May 1 International Workers Day and May 9 Victory Day, strict security would be imposed on Moscow's metro network up until May 15, 2010. As a result of the terror bombings, the number of daily commuters in the Moscow metro decreased by 17% the next day.

=== Follow-up ===
About 48 hours after the Moscow Metro bombings a double suicide bombing hit the Caucasian Republic of Dagestan, killing the city police chief amongst others. Russia immediately drew parallels, saying the two bombings were linked. On April 1 another bombing in Dagestan killed two more people. On April 5, exactly a week after the Moscow attacks, another bombing in Ingushetia targeting a police barracks drew parallels between that and the Dagestan attacks. It was feared that these incidents might lead to an escalation of violence in general.

== Investigation ==
Special meeting following the Moscow metro bombings

According to Interfax news agency, citing law enforcement sources, surveillance cameras captured two women – aged between 18 and 20 – boarding the metro at the Yugo-Zapadnaya station. Police were hunting for one 30-year-old man with North Caucasian features, and two other women of Slavic appearance aged 22 and 45 who had been seen shepherding the bombers into the station. All had their faces uncovered.

Unconfirmed reports said the perpetrators tried to take the explosives to the Russian Ministry of Defense building on Arbat street. Law enforcement also speculated the suicide bombers may have confused the stations, missing one of their original targets – Oktyabrskaya station. They opine that the attackers intended to blow up the Lubyanka station, which is located next to central headquarters of FSB, and then Oktyabrskaya, which is attached to the Ministry of Internal Affairs. Officials suspect that Muslim rebels from the troubled North Caucasus region that includes Chechnya are responsible for the attack. The link to the Caucasian group was immediate. According to preliminary reports, law enforcement were notified about possible terror acts through three telegrams indicating potential threats to Moscow's transport system, but the suicide bombers passed through the security. Unofficial reports the morning before the attacks took place indicate many female passengers of North Caucasian appearance were stopped and checked by Moscow security enforcement under pretence of routine ID verifications, and taken to local precincts.

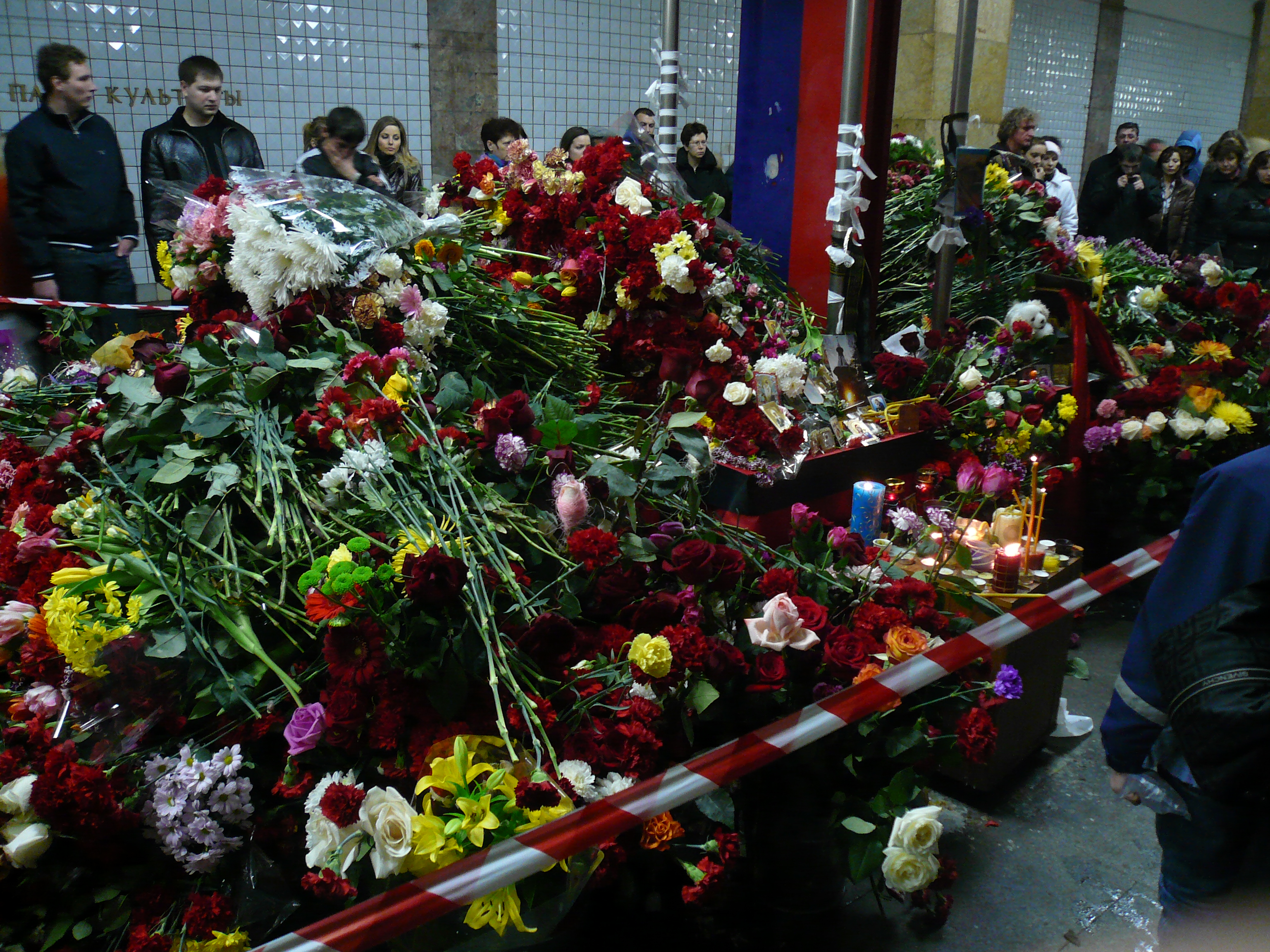
Commuters leave flowers at the Park Kultury station

The Investigation Committee of the Procuracy of the Russian Federation started a criminal investigation under Article 205 of the Russian Criminal Code ("act of terrorism").

== Perpetrators ==
Two female natives of Dagestan are believed to have detonated the explosions. Russian authorities released photographs of both women, showing their facial features to be intact and possibly identifiable. Russia's FSB security service have named the suicide bomber behind the Park Kultury metro station explosion as Dzhanet Abdullayeva (1992–2010), "black widow" who had lived in the Khasavyurtsky region of Dagestan. She was the widow of 30-year-old Umalat Magomedov, a prominent insurgent killed by Russian forces on December 31, 2009.

Investigators confirmed that the second attacker was Maryam Sharipova, a 28-year-old schoolteacher from Dagestan, after her father identified her body although he claimed she had a degree in mathematics and psychology and taught computer science while never expressing any "radical beliefs". Although, there was some speculation as to whether her brother had been arrested in connection to North Caucassian fighters. Police had identified an apartment rented out by two suspected accomplices of the bombers. The men were believed to have accompanied the women to a metro station in the southwest of the city and handed over the bomb belts. They then went back to the apartment where they were said to have remotely detonated the charges. The two were known to police who have put them on a wanted list.

Moscow said that there were an additional twenty-one "black widows" ready to strike, and were studying if the alleged attackers were part of an original group of thirty. Female suicide bombers, known as "black widows," have been involved in suicide bombings on numerous occasions, including 2004 bombings of two passenger planes that took off from Domodedovo International Airport, previous Moscow metro bombings, the Moscow theater hostage crisis, and the Beslan school hostage crisis.

The Caucasus Emirate immediately denied responsibility for the attack, saying that they planned attacks on economic targets inside Russia, but not against civilians. However, the attack followed a warning from Chechen rebel leader Doku Umarov the prior month of his intent to spread the Caucasian insurgency to Russian cities.

Two days following the blasts, in a video message posted on a Chechen rebel website, Umarov claimed that his group was behind the bombings and that he had ordered the attacks. He said the Moscow attacks were an act of revenge for the killings of Chechen and Ingush civilians by Russian security forces near Arshty on February 11, and that more attacks would follow.

On March, 29 in Moscow were accomplished two special operations on exterminating kafirs and saying hello to the FSB. Both these operations were accomplished by my order [...] And today, any politician, any journalist, any person that would condemn these operations, accuse me of terrorism, I laugh to his face, I only grin[...]

— Doku Umarov (Amir of the Caucasus Emirate, ex-president of the Chechen Republic of Ichkeria), Statement of the Amir of the Caucasus Emirate.

On May 13, FSB director Alexander Bortnikov announced that they had identified all members of the group behind the attack and that three of the members were killed during a raid in an attempt to detain them, one of them being the person who escorted the suicide bombers from Dagestan to Moscow. Bortnikov was quoted as saying: "To our great regret, we were unable to detain them alive because they put up fierce armed resistance and were killed."

== Reactions ==
President Dmitry Medvedev visits the Lubyanka Metro

Following the attacks, Russian president Dmitry Medvedev and Prime Minister Vladimir Putin as well as Ramzan Kadyrov, President of the Chechen Republic, were quick to comment on the attacks.

The attack also sparked condemnation and expressions of condolence from numerous governments and heads of state, as well as international bodies such as NATO, the Council of Europe, and the European Union who also condemned the attacks and/or expressed condolences to the victims' families.

Amongst media reactions, there was controversy about how the Russian media handled the reporting in the first hours after the attack. Outside Russia, the United States increased security and police presence on transit systems in New York City, Washington, D.C., Chicago, and Atlanta following the attacks.

== See also ==
- 1977 Moscow bombings
- February 2004 Moscow Metro bombing
- August 2004 Moscow Metro bombing
- 2009 Nevsky Express bombing
- List of terrorist incidents, 2010
- December 2013 Volgograd bombings
- 2017 Saint Petersburg Metro bombing
- Crisis situations and unrest in Europe since 2000
- Human rights in Chechnya
  - War crimes and terrorism in Chechnya
- Islamic terrorism
- Incidents in Moscow Metro
- Insurgency in the North Caucasus
- List of Islamist terrorist attacks
- List of terrorist incidents involving railway systems
