= Park Kultury =

Park Kultury may refer to:

Russian rapid transit

- Park Kultury (Koltsevaya Line), a station of the Moscow Metro
- Park Kultury (Sokolnicheskaya Line), a station of the Moscow Metro
- Park Kultury (Nizhny Novgorod Metro)
- Park Kultury (Volgograd Metro)
- Krestovsky Ostrov (Saint Petersburg Metro), called "Park Kultury" while in project

Other

- Gorky Park (Moscow)
- Silesian Culture and Recreation Park, a park in Poland
