= Park Kultury (Sokolnicheskaya line) =

Moscow Metro station

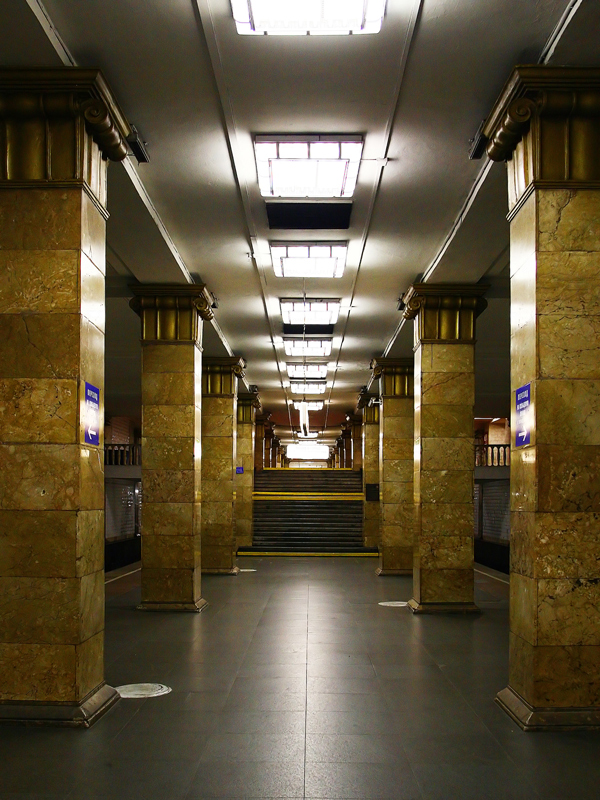

General information
- Location: Ostozhenka Street; Khamovniki District; Central Administrative Okrug; Moscow; Russia
- Coordinates: 55.7356°N 37.5943°E
- System: Moscow Metro station
- Owner: Moskovsky Metropoliten
- Line: Sokolnicheskaya line
- Platforms: 1 island platform
- Tracks: 2
- Connections: Trolleybus: Б (B), 10, 28, 31, 31к, 79

Construction
- Structure type: Shallow column triple-span
- Depth: 10.5 metres (34 ft)
- Platform levels: 1
- Parking: No
- Cycle facilities: No

Other information
- Station code: 013

History
- Opened: 15 May 1935; 91 years ago
- Former names: Tsentralnyi Park Kultury i Otdykha imeni Gorkovo (1935–1980)

Passengers
- 2002: 3,650,000

Services
Preceding station	Moscow Metro	Following station
Frunzenskaya towards Potapovo	Sokolnicheskaya line	Kropotkinskaya towards Bulvar Rokossovskogo
Oktyabrskaya anticlockwise / outer	Koltsevaya line transfer at Park Kultury	Kiyevskaya clockwise / inner
Route map
Location
- Location within Central Moscow

Park Kultury (Russian: Парк Культу́ры, English: Park of Culture) is a Moscow Metro station in the Khamovniki District, Central Administrative Okrug, Moscow. Located within the Sokolnicheskaya line, between Frunzenskaya and Kropotkinskaya stations, it is named after the nearby Maxim Gorky Park of Culture and Leisure across the Moskva River.

The station was designed by Nikolai Kolli and opened on 15 May 1935, along with the first phase of the Moscow Metro.

== History ==
The construction of the station began in the spring of 1933. From the start it was clear that construction of this final station would not be an easy task. Being only several hundred metres from the bank of the Moskva River, the soil was particularly damp, with the level of subterranean waters being higher than the future ceiling of the station.

Even more important was that the station is situated under the Crimean Square (Krymskaya Ploshchad) of the Garden Ring's intersection with the southwestern Ostozhenka Street/Komsomolsky Avenue and thus being an important traffic hub. Before the pit of the station was excavated along its future perimeter, metallic casts reinforced by solid logs with caulked slits between them were forced into the ground, and abyssal water lowering was employed as the pit was slowly excavated to its required depth. All of this was necessary to prevent the flooding of the pit, which was likely to have caused subsidence and even destruction of nearby houses. As soon as that work was completed, a wooden bridge was erected at street level to prevent traffic disruption. Most of the construction was carried out at night. The station was completed in eleven months during which time 100,000 cubic metres of soil was removed from the pit and replaced with 25,000 cubic metres of concrete.

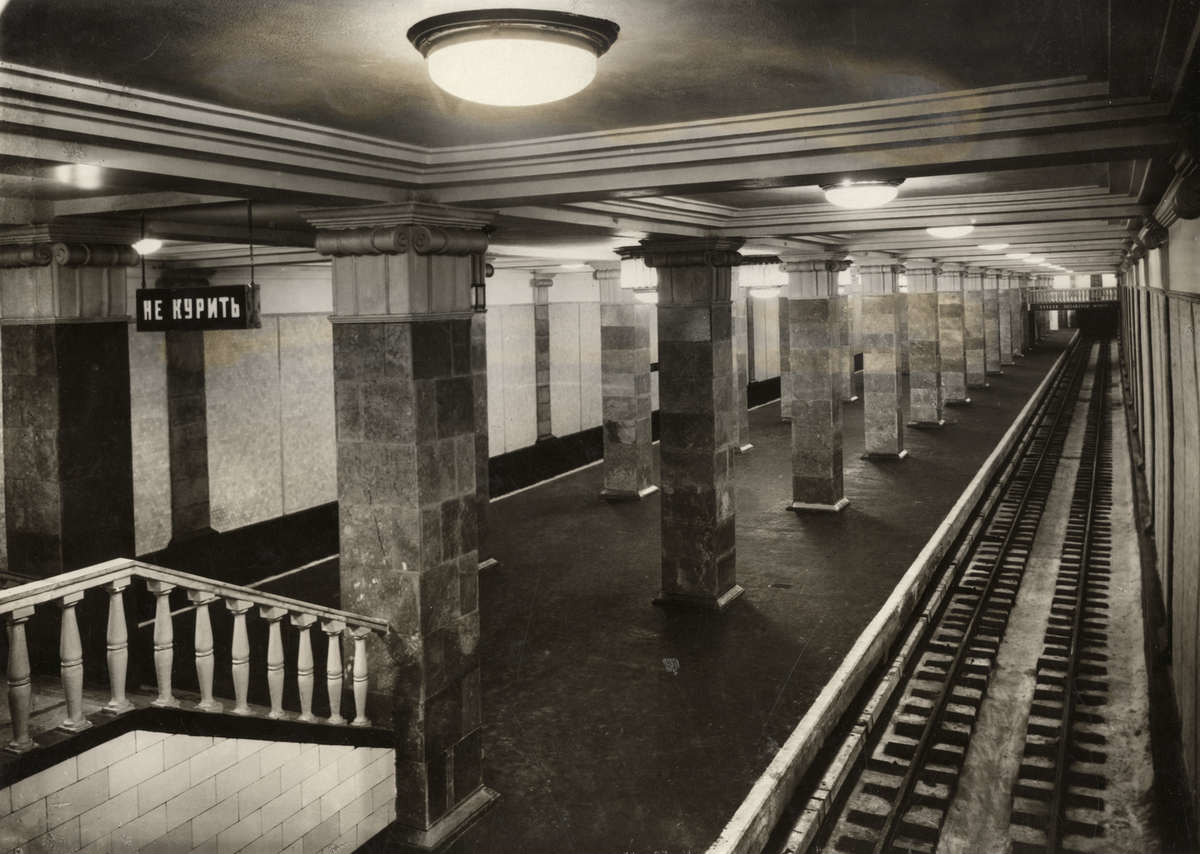
Central span in 1930s

The station is a bi-level pillar-trispan with four footbridges above the platforms. Architects Krutikov and Popov chose a decoration inspired by ancient Greek elements. Along the platform, two rows of 22 pillars are faced with Crimean marble Kadykovka and topped with moulded сapitals. Along the walls a set of dark rose-coloured mosaic pilasters repeat the step of the pillars (every seven metres), blending very well with the porcelain tiles that face the rest of the wall area. Also, a dark-brown mosaic socle runs below the platform level along both walls. A total of 1500 square meters of marble, and 200 square metres of porcelain tiles, were used in the decorations.

The footbridges which lead to the vestibules are separately decorated with red metalloplastic tiles and moulded white balustrades with marbled railings. The walls of the corridors leading to the vestibules are revetted with white uralian koelga marble.

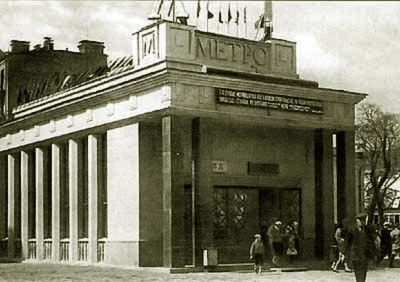
Original vestibule on Krymskaya Square

The station originally had two vestibules, one of which, a distinctive rotunda building, still stands on the corner between Ostozhenka street and Novokrymskiy side-street. The second vestibule used to stand on the corner of Komsmolskiy Avenue and Sadovoye Koltso. The ticket hall was faced with brown Ural ufaley marble and had four welded octagonal columns faced with white koelga marble. The ticket offices themselves were built out of polished oak. This vestibule was pulled down in 1949 when a larger vestibule was erected in its place, and the old corridors were integrated into it. The vestibule also offers a transfer to the Koltsevaya line, which was opened in 1950.

This station is one of the few surviving from the first stage that have remained more or less unchanged since their opening (compared with Lubyanka or Chistiye Prudy), except for the resurfacing the platform with granite (instead of original asphalt) and the installation of new lighting. The latter consisted of beautiful chandeliers in the central span and semi-circular lamps made of milk-white glass in side naves. However, with the introduction of luminescent lamps, the chandeliers and the lamps in the naves were completely removed. Despite that, the new lighting installations managed to fit in with the architectural composition and do not appear out of place, like on Kiyevskaya which had an analogous makeover.

When the station opened in 1935, it was also the terminus of the Frunze Branch of the first stage (and from 1938, of Kirovsko–Frunzenskaya line). Although the plans called for the station to have a four-track reversal siding, that was not finished until 1937, and a temporary piston junction was instead installed before the platform to allow reversal of the trains. The station ceased to be the terminus in 1957, with the extension of the Frunzenskiy radius southwestward to Sportivnaya.

When the station was opened, it had quite a long name: Tsentralnyi Park Kultury i Otdykha imeni Gorkogo (The Maxim Gorky Central Park of Culture and Leisure). However, even on the plans it was abbreviated as TsPKiO and only voice announcements used the full name. In 1980, with the holding of the Olympic Games in Moscow, the name was shortened to avoid lengthy trilingual station announcements, although some signs still bear the original long version of the name.

The station is used by 107,700 people daily, mainly passengers changing to and from Park Kultury on the Circle line, with only 9,650 passengers entering and leaving the Metro system at the station.

On March 29, 2010, the station, along with Lubyanka, was subject to a terrorist attack, resulting in 40 casualties.

== Gallery ==
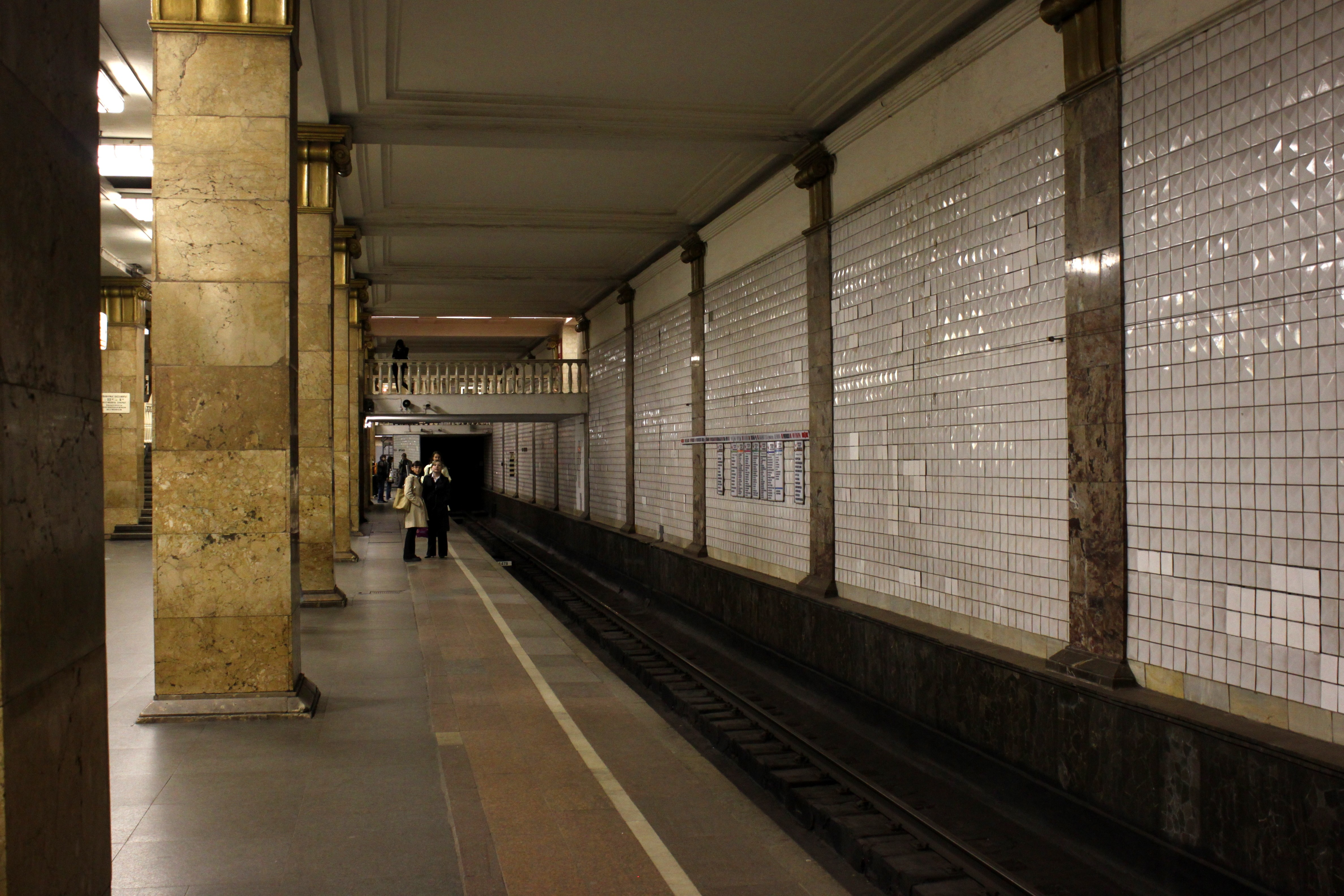
Platform view

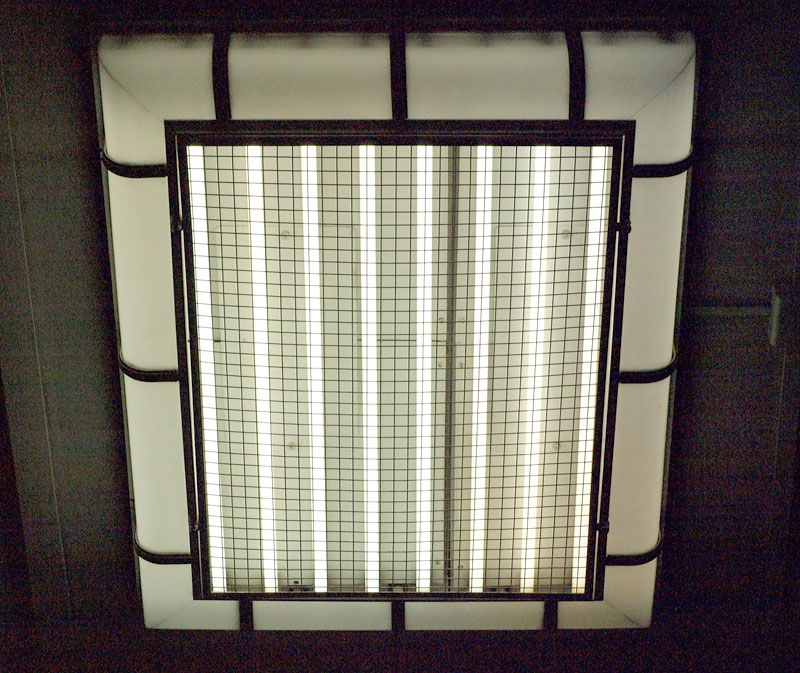
Station lighting

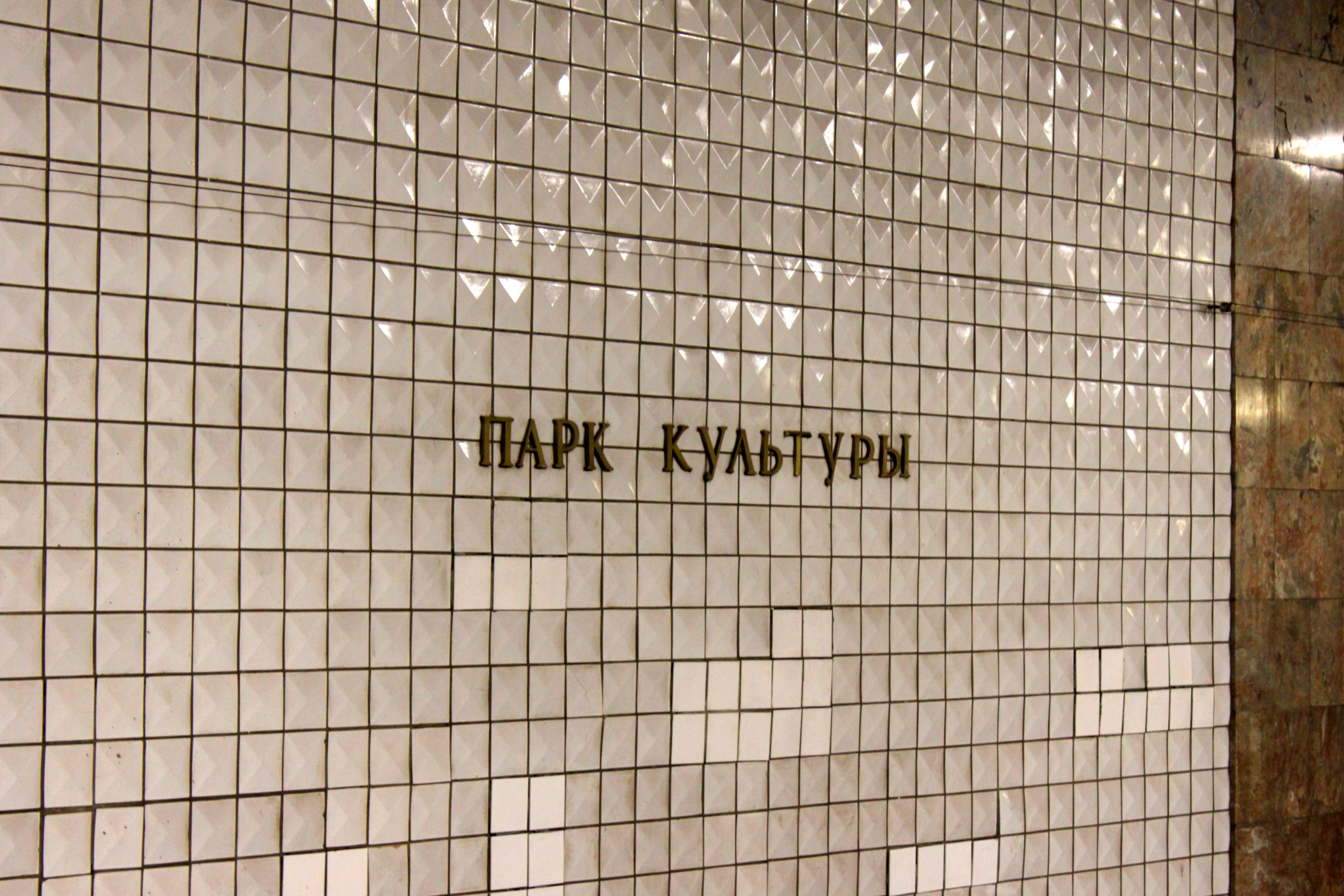
Station name

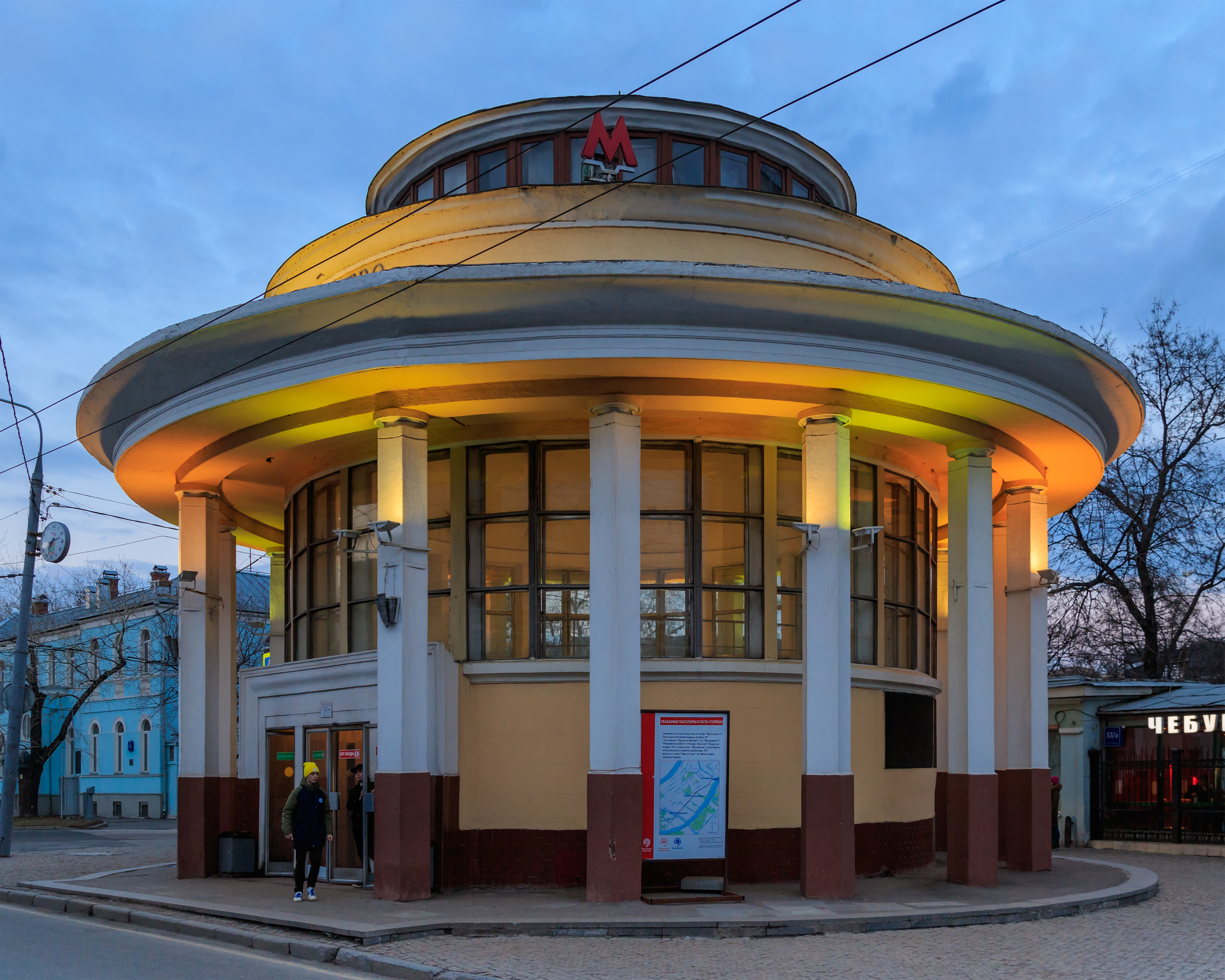
Entrance building
