= Park Kultury (Koltsevaya line) =

Moscow Metro station

Park Kultury Парк культуры
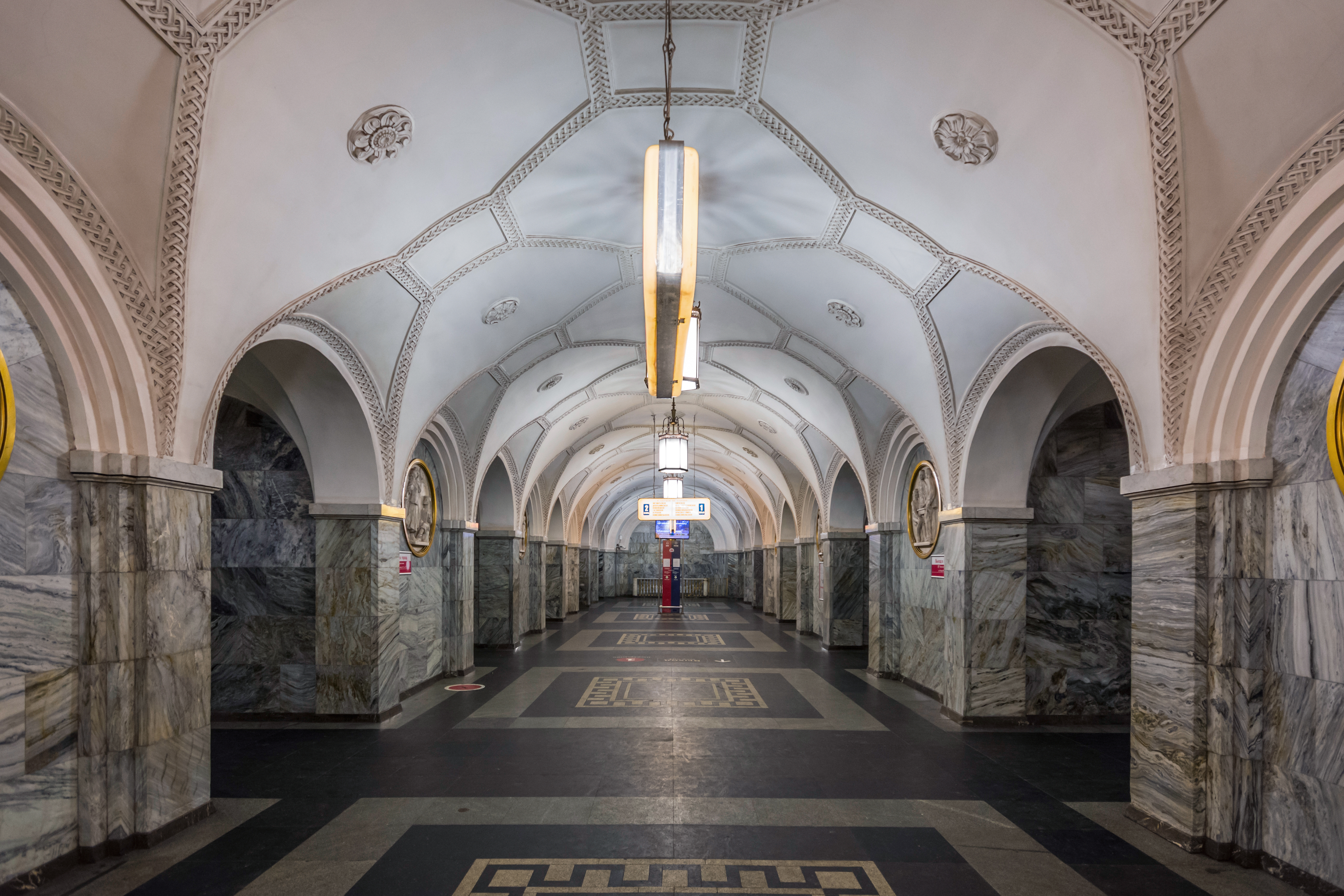

General information
- Location: Ostozhenka Street, Khamovniki District, Central Administrative Okrug
- Coordinates: 55.7357°N 37.5915°E
- System: Moscow Metro station
- Owner: Moskovsky Metropoliten
- Line: Koltsevaya line
- Platforms: 1
- Tracks: 2
- Connections: Trolleybus: Б, 10, 28, 31, 31к, 79

Construction
- Structure type: Deep pylon tri-vault
- Depth: 40 metres (130 ft)
- Platform levels: 1
- Parking: No

Other information
- Station code: 076

History
- Opened: 1 January 1950; 76 years ago
- Rebuilt: February 2011 – 30 March 2012
- Former names: Park Kultury Imeni Gorkogo

Services
Preceding station	Moscow Metro	Following station
Oktyabrskaya anticlockwise / outer	Koltsevaya line	Kiyevskaya clockwise / inner
Frunzenskaya towards Potapovo	Sokolnicheskaya line transfer at Park Kultury	Kropotkinskaya towards Bulvar Rokossovskogo
Route map
Location
- Location within Central Moscow

Park Kultury (Russian: Парк культу́ры) is a Moscow Metro station in the Khamovniki District, Central Administrative Okrug, Moscow. It is on the Koltsevaya line (Circle line), between Oktyabrskaya and Kiyevskaya stations. Park Kultury opened on 1 January 1950.

== Design ==
The station is a standard pylon tri-vault, that was built in the flamboyance of the 1950s. Architect Igor Rozhin (who would then design the Luzhniki Stadium) applied a classic sport recreational theme to match the connotation with the ancient-Greek inspired transfer station. This includes large and imposing pylons faced with grey marble that came directly from Georgia. The floor is laid with black and grey granite tiles imitating a carpet. The walls are faced with white marble and labradorite. Decoratively the station contains 26 circular bas-reliefs by Iosif Rabinovich which depict sporting and other leisure activities of the Soviet youth.

The white vault of the station contains complex geometry which repeats that of the arches, and along the apex are suspended a set of intricate hexagonal chandeliers. Rozhin later admitted that he made a grave error in choosing to place the chandeliers amid the arches, not between them, that way he would have avoided giving the bas-reliefs a double shadow. At the end of the station is a massive marble wall with a small profile bas-relief of Maxim Gorky. The station was initially called "Park Kultury imeni Gorkogo" (Парк Культуры имени Горького) but during the 1980 Moscow Olympics this was shortened as the Russian announcements were repeated in English and French during the games. After the Olympics, the shorter name was retained. The original long form appears in bronze letters next to Gorky's image.

The station has a large imposing vestibule located on the corner of Komsomolsky Avenue and Garden Ring next to the Krymsky Bridge which was co-designed with Rozhin by Yelena Markova. Originally Rozhin planned for an extended arcade modeled after Russian trading rows, but this was rejected in favour of a more traditional design. The large building features a central dome, and inside has four bas-reliefs of sportsmen, and another one on its portico outside (all by G. Motovilov). The vestibule also doubles as a transfer to the Sokolnicheskaya line.

As the station was initially terminus, a set of reversal sidings exist in front of it, also from them runs a service branch to the Sokolnicheskaya line which was used initially as the primary way of transferring rolling stock to the station before the opening of the Koltsevaya line's depot in 1954.

== Reconstruction ==
On 14 January 2011, Moscow Metro authorities announced their plans to close the station on 5 February 2011 so as to replace the ageing escalators. Park Kultury was supposed to open in December 2011 but the date was shifted to 30 March 2012 due to delays in shipping new escalators. and opened the station on 28 April.

== Image gallery ==
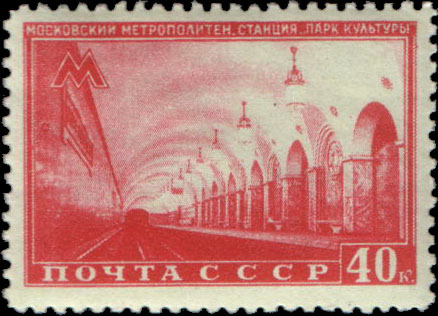
The station on a 1950 postage stamp

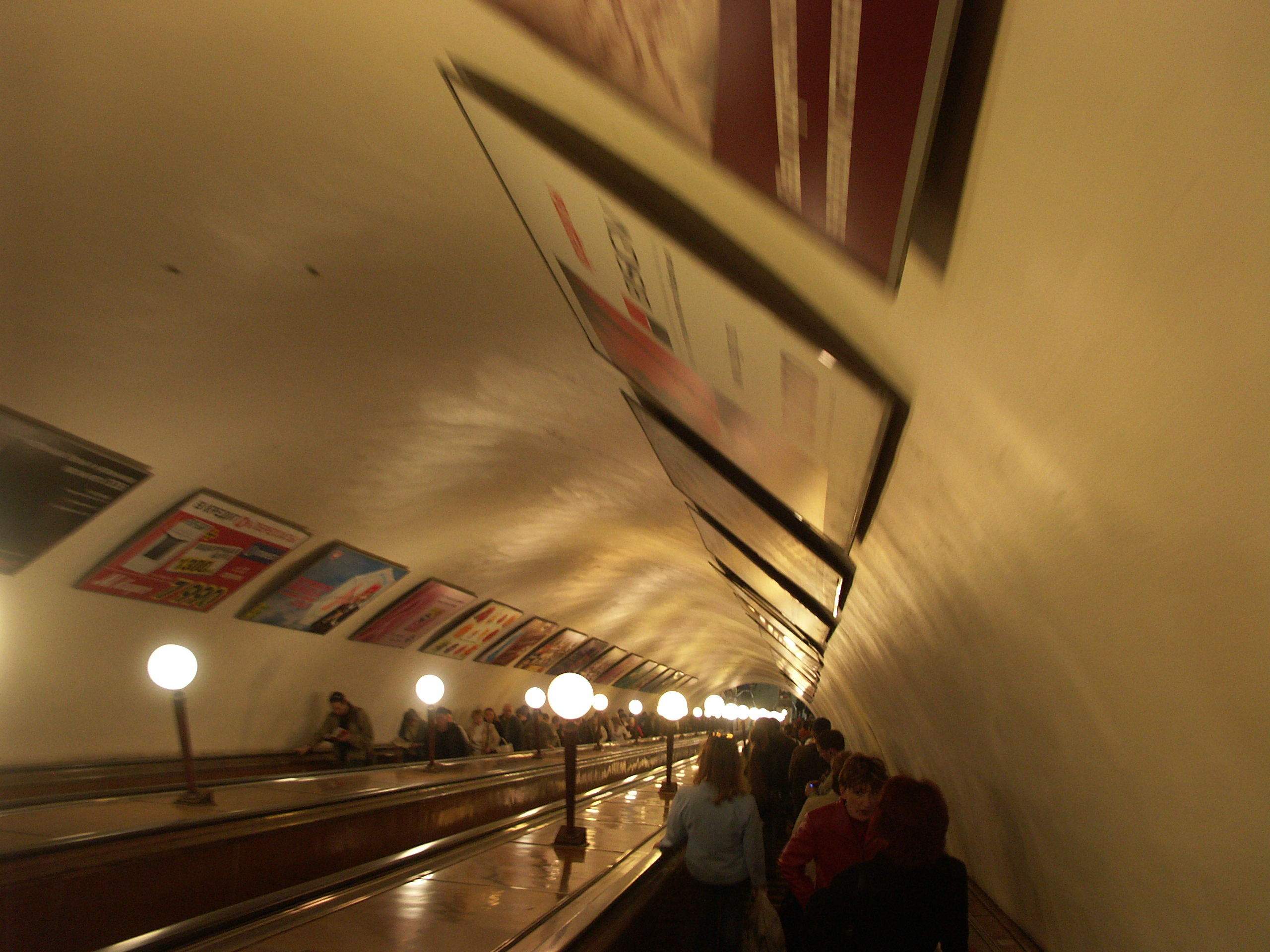
Escalators (from the Park Kultury on the Sokolnicheskaya line)

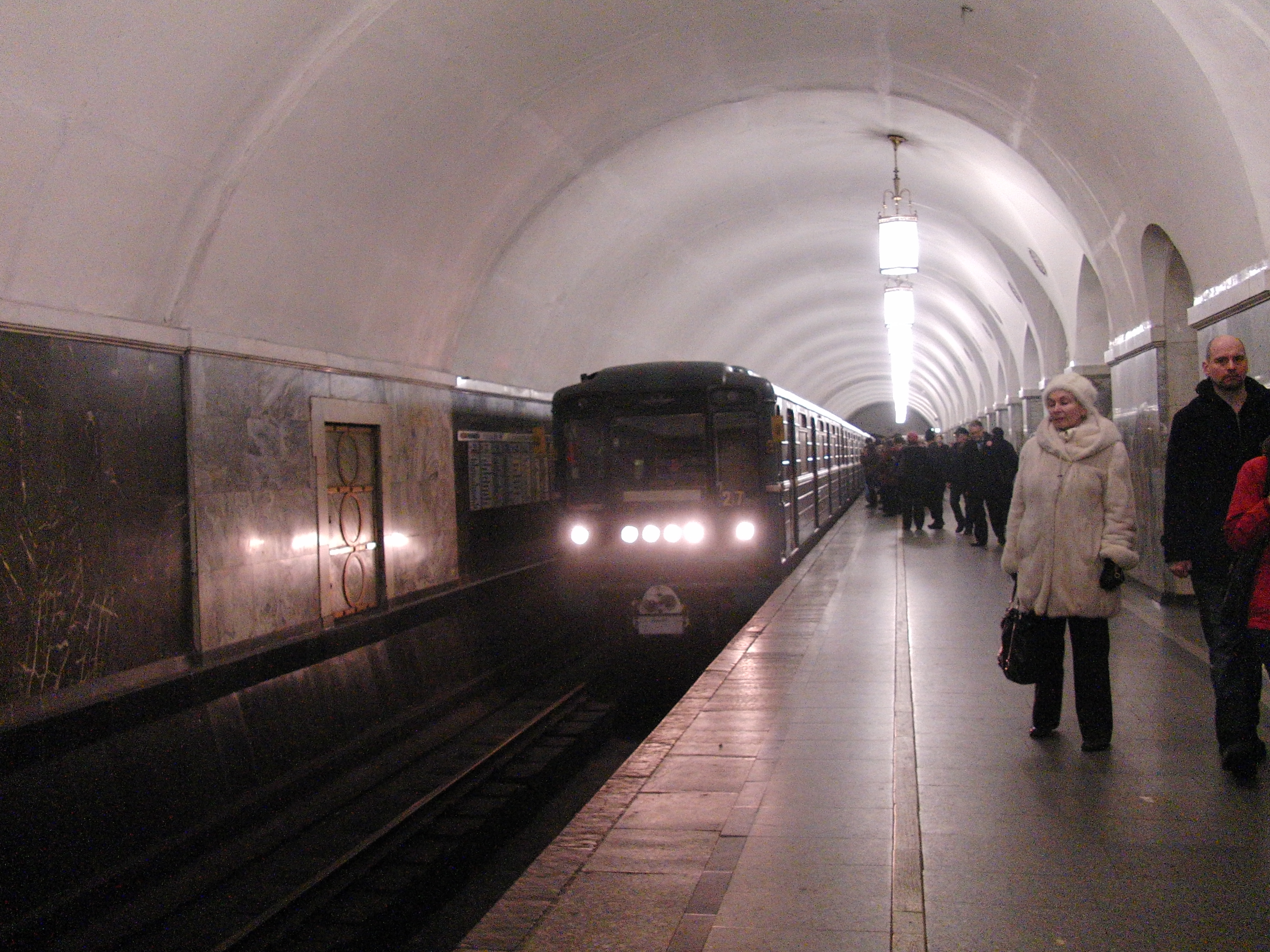
Station platform

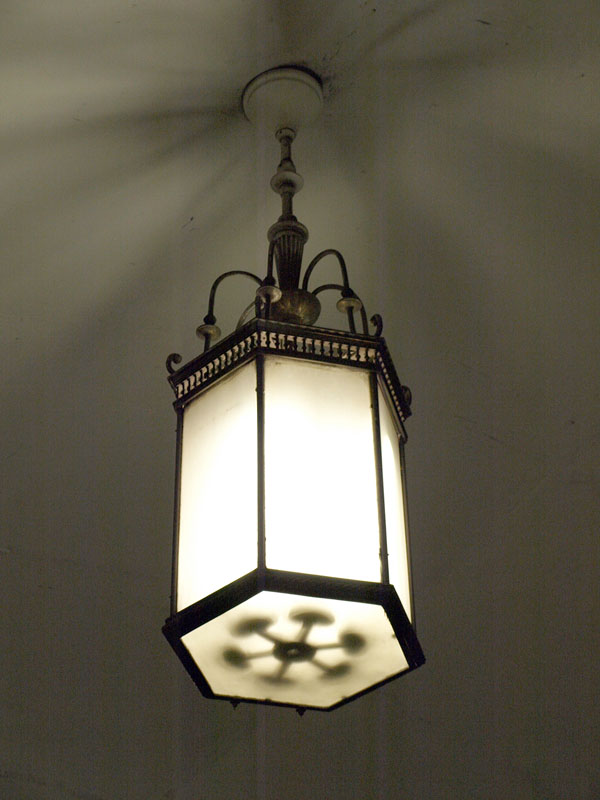
Lanterns

Bas-relief

Figure skaters
