= Prospekt Mira =

Prospekt Mira may refer to:

- Mira Avenue, a street in Moscow
- Prospekt Mira (Koltsevaya line), a Moscow Metro station on the Koltsevaya line
- Prospekt Mira (Kaluzhsko-Rizhskaya line), a Moscow Metro station on the Kaluzhsko-Rizhskaya line
