= Oktyabrskaya (Koltsevaya line) =

Moscow Metro station

Oktyabrskaya Октябрьская (Russian)
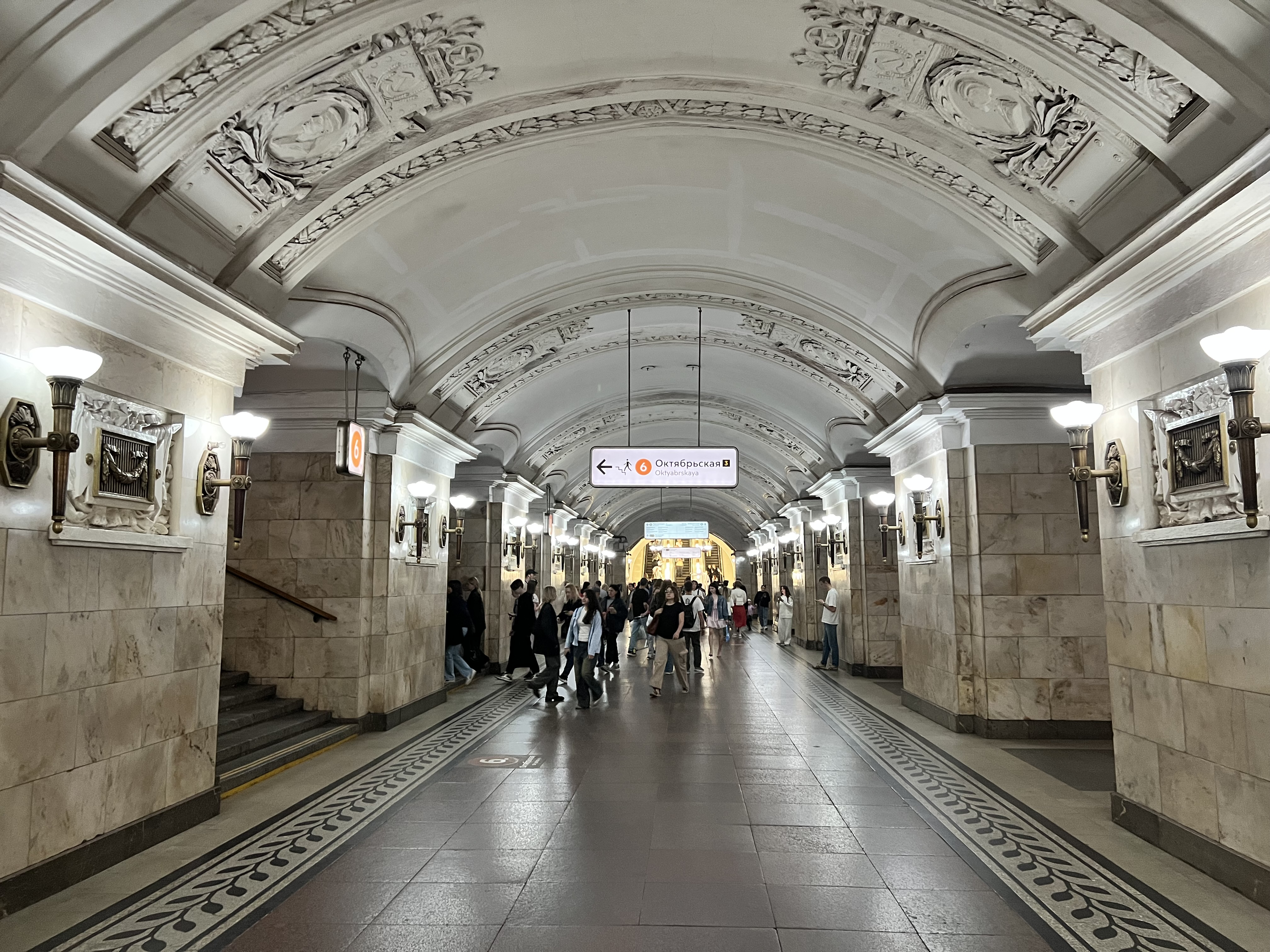

General information
- Location: Yakimanka District; Central Administrative Okrug; Moscow; Russia
- Coordinates: 55.7297°N 37.6091°E
- System: Moscow Metro station
- Owner: Moskovsky Metropoliten
- Line: Koltsevaya line
- Platforms: 1
- Tracks: 2
- Connections: Bus: Б, м1, м16, е10, е12, е85, 111, 196, 297, с910, н11

Construction
- Depth: 40 metres (130 ft)
- Platform levels: 1
- Parking: No

Other information
- Station code: 075

History
- Opened: 1 January 1950; 76 years ago
- Former names: Kaluzhskaya (1950-1961)

Passengers
- 2002: 19,235,500

Services
Preceding station	Moscow Metro	Following station
Dobryninskaya anticlockwise / outer	Koltsevaya line	Park Kultury clockwise / inner
Shabolovskaya towards Novoyasenevskaya	Kaluzhsko-Rizhskaya line transfer at Oktyabrskaya	Tretyakovskaya towards Medvedkovo
Route map
Location
- Location within Central Moscow

Oktyabrskaya (Russian: Октя́брьская, lit. 'October') is a station on the Koltsevaya line of the Moscow Metro. Opened on 1 January 1950, Oktyabrskaya was part of the first segment of the fourth stage. Designed by Leonid Polyakov who took the mid-19th century Neoclassical triumphal Empire style as the basis, and incorporated the themes of the 1812 victory over Napoleon to match the 1945 Soviet victory in the Second World War, applying to the standard pylon tri-vault design.

Both the central and platform vaults are divided by arches which have large bas-reliefs which contain medallions of Soviet Army soldiers surrounded by ornaments. The pylons contain a bas-relief centred ventilation grilles which are flanked by two anodized aluminum torches that give the overall golden glow to the bright grey marble that faces them. The station walls are ceramic tiles and are decorated with relief images of gilded wreaths and stars. The end of a central hall contains a miniature triumphal arch with a metallic gate that walls of a blue lit room, symbolising the time of peaceful life. The floor of the station is laid with grey and red granite, and the perimeter of the central hall is also bordered out by a pattern of bright and dark marble.

The station has a large vestibule on the Octyabrskaya square (until 1922 – Kaluzhskaya square, named after the city of Kaluga) on the Garden Ring and hence the station's original name Kaluzhskaya (Калужская), renamed on 6 June 1961 to its present name (though the square's historic name was restored in 1992). The vestibule on exterior contains large bas-reliefs of trumpeters that are lit by lamps concealed as columns underneath. Inside the ticket and escalator halls are decorated with casts and bas-reliefs containing battle banners, weapons figures of the Soviet Army and women symbolizing glory (work by G.Motovilov). In 1989 the stand-alone structure was built into the Moscow Institute of Steel and Alloys.

In 1962, a set of staircases were added to the central hall for a transfer to the newly opened Oktyabrskaya of the Kaluzhsko–Rizhskaya line.

== Image gallery ==
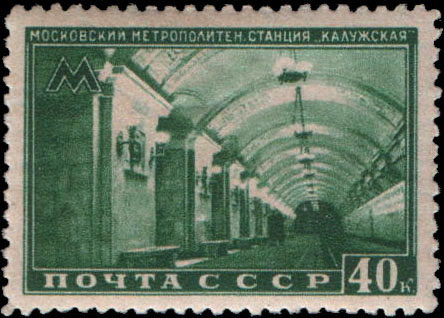
1950 stamp depicting the station; it uses its original name, "Kaluzhskaya"

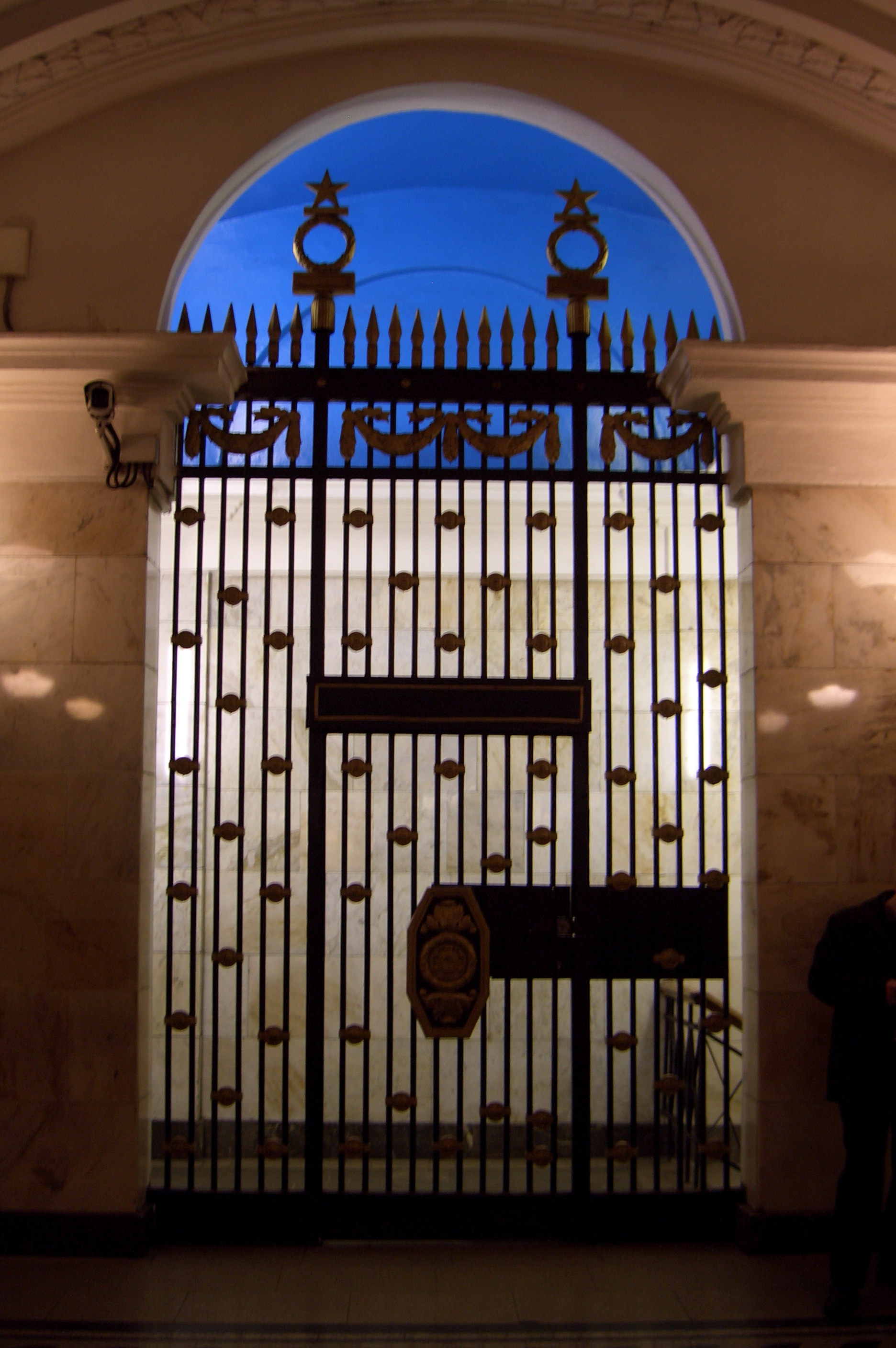
Gate at the dead end of the hall, informally known as 'Nebo' (The Sky)

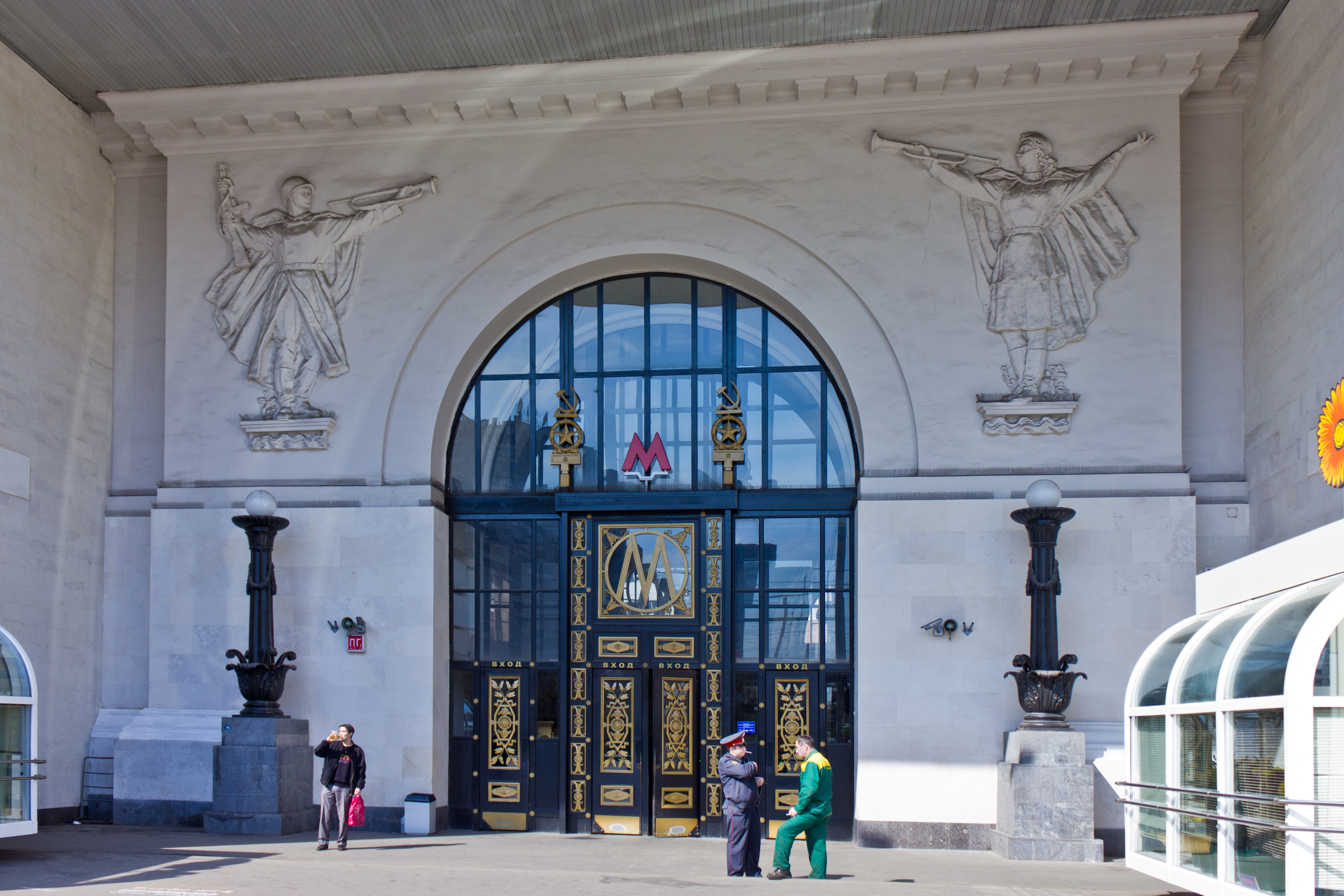

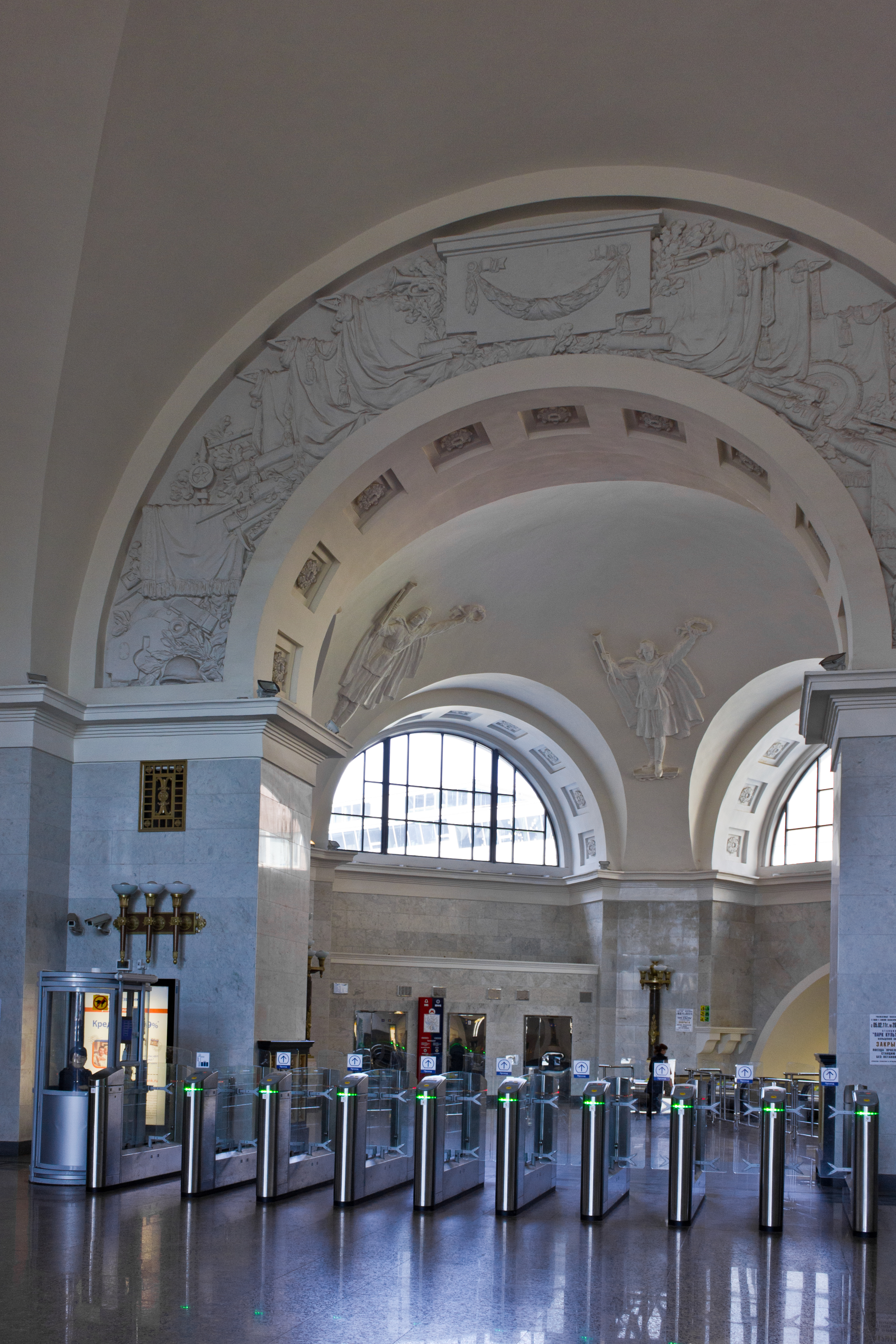

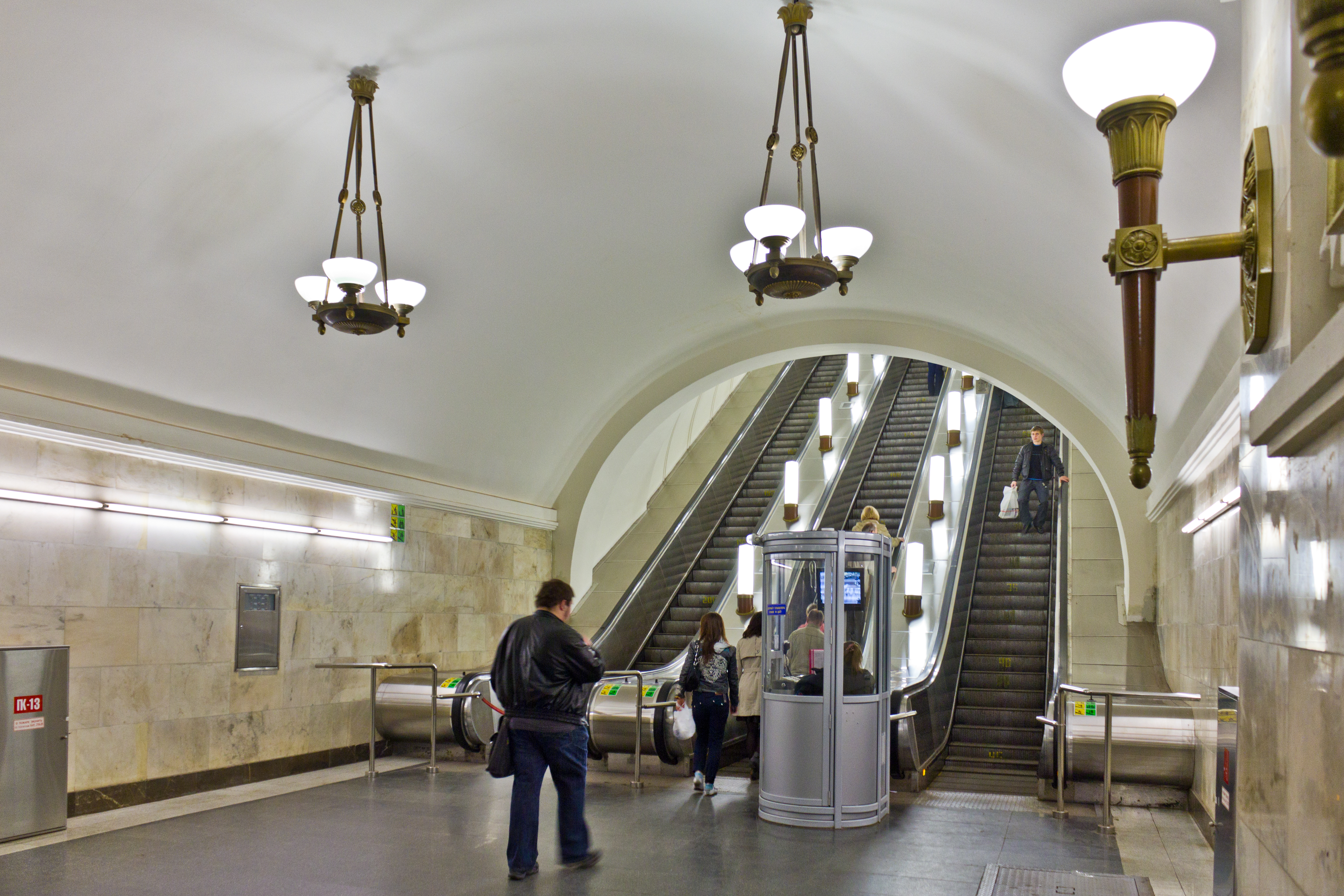

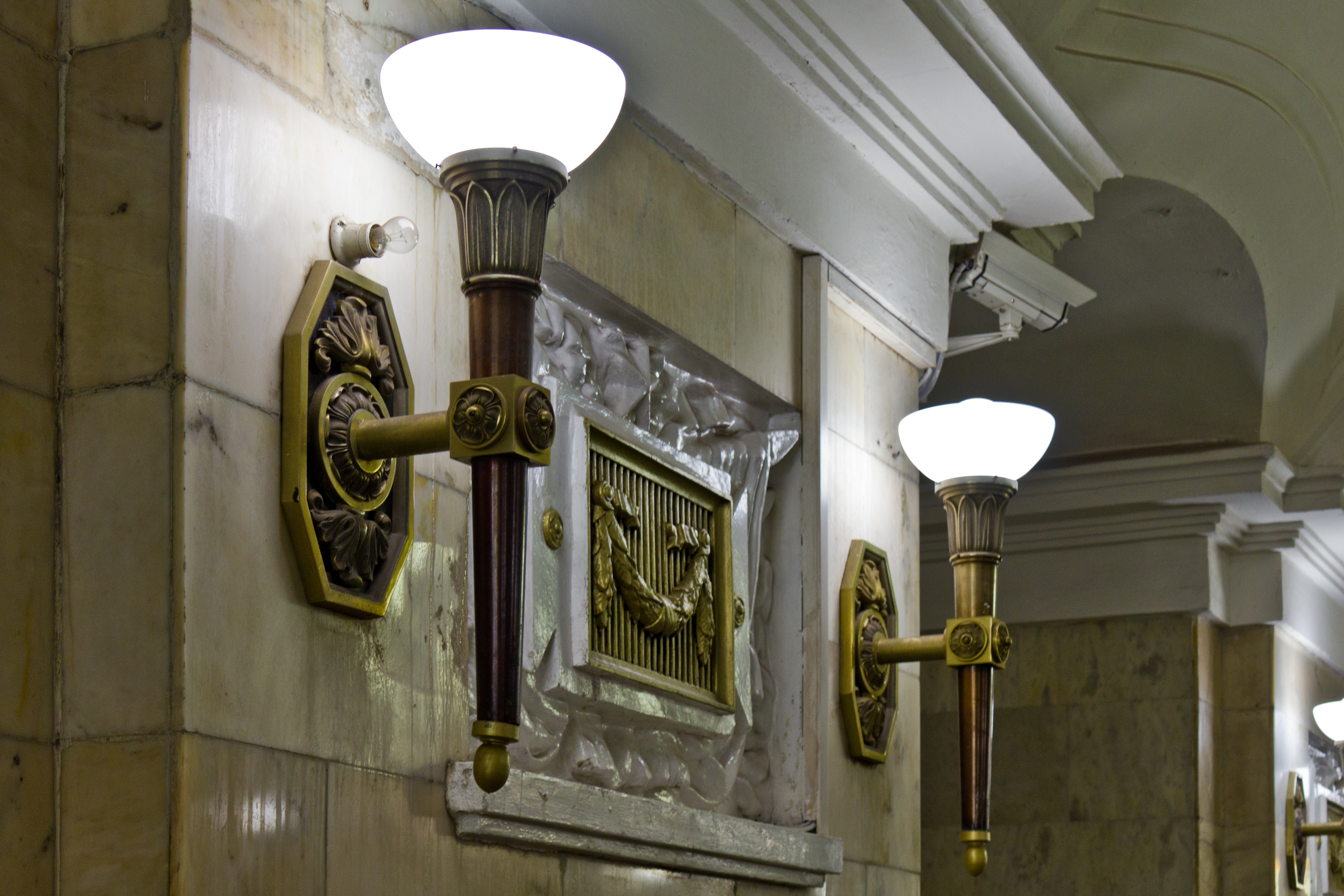

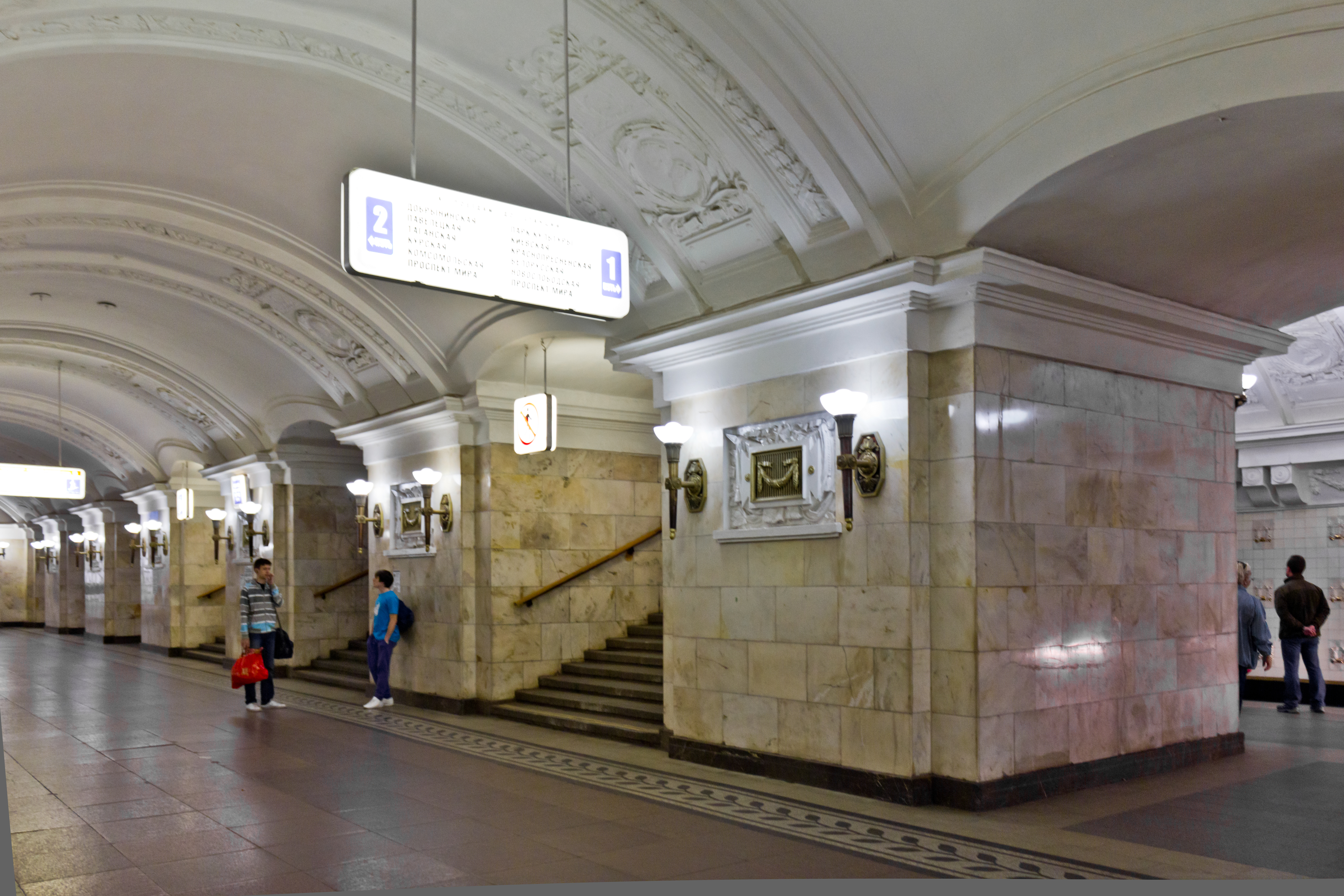

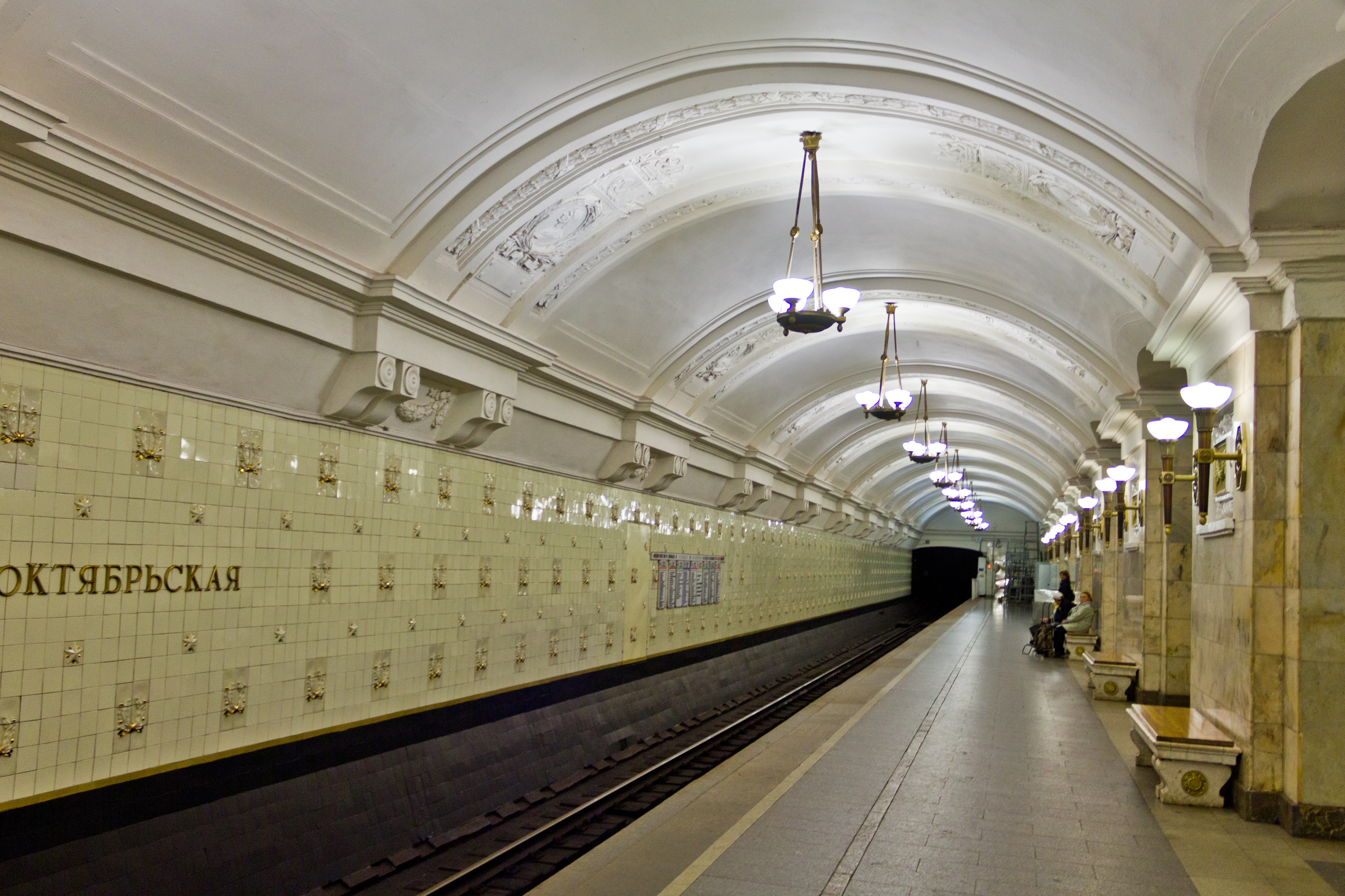
Platform of the station

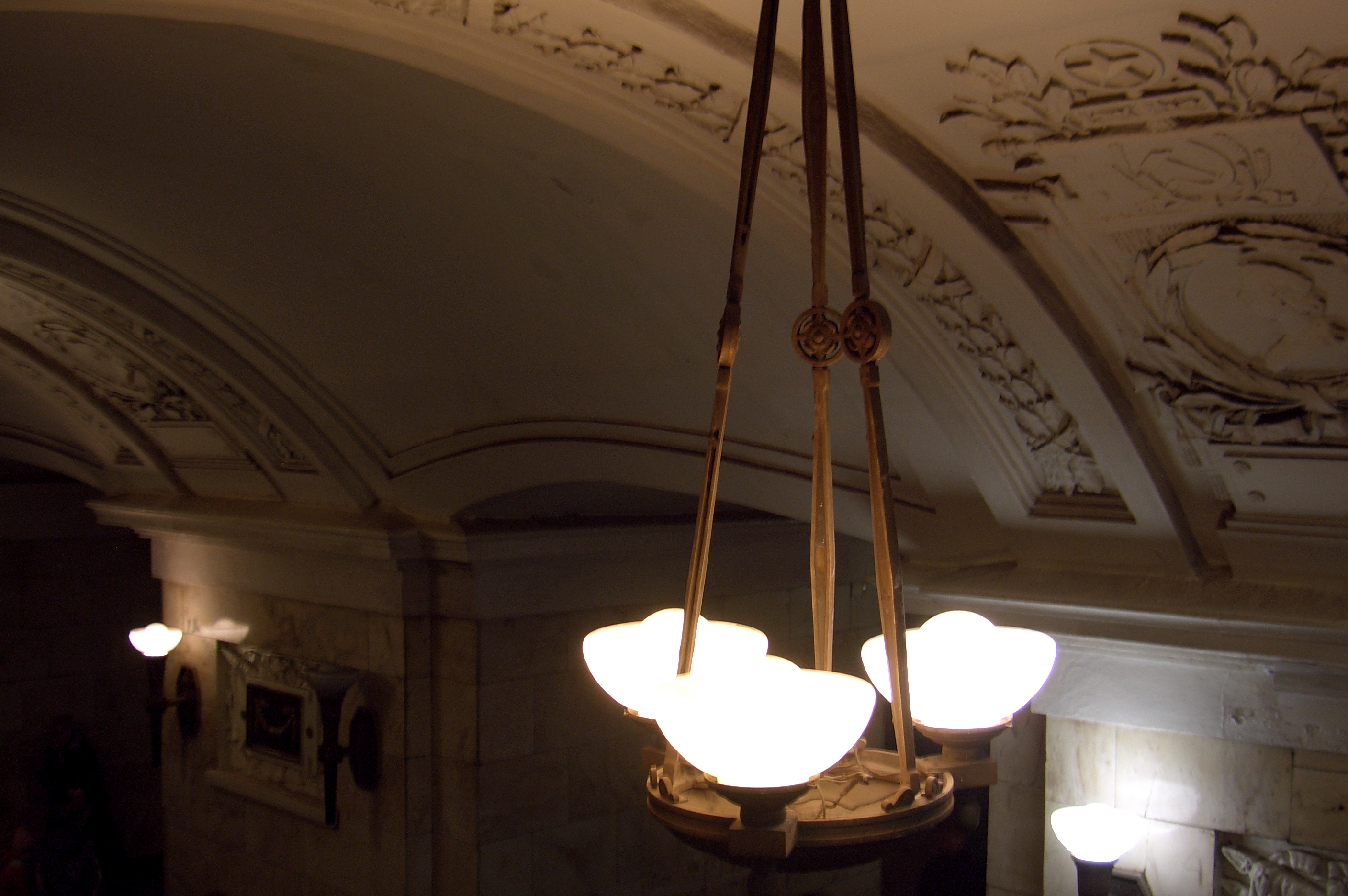
Detail of the ceiling
