= Frunzenskaya (Moscow Metro) =

Moscow Metro station

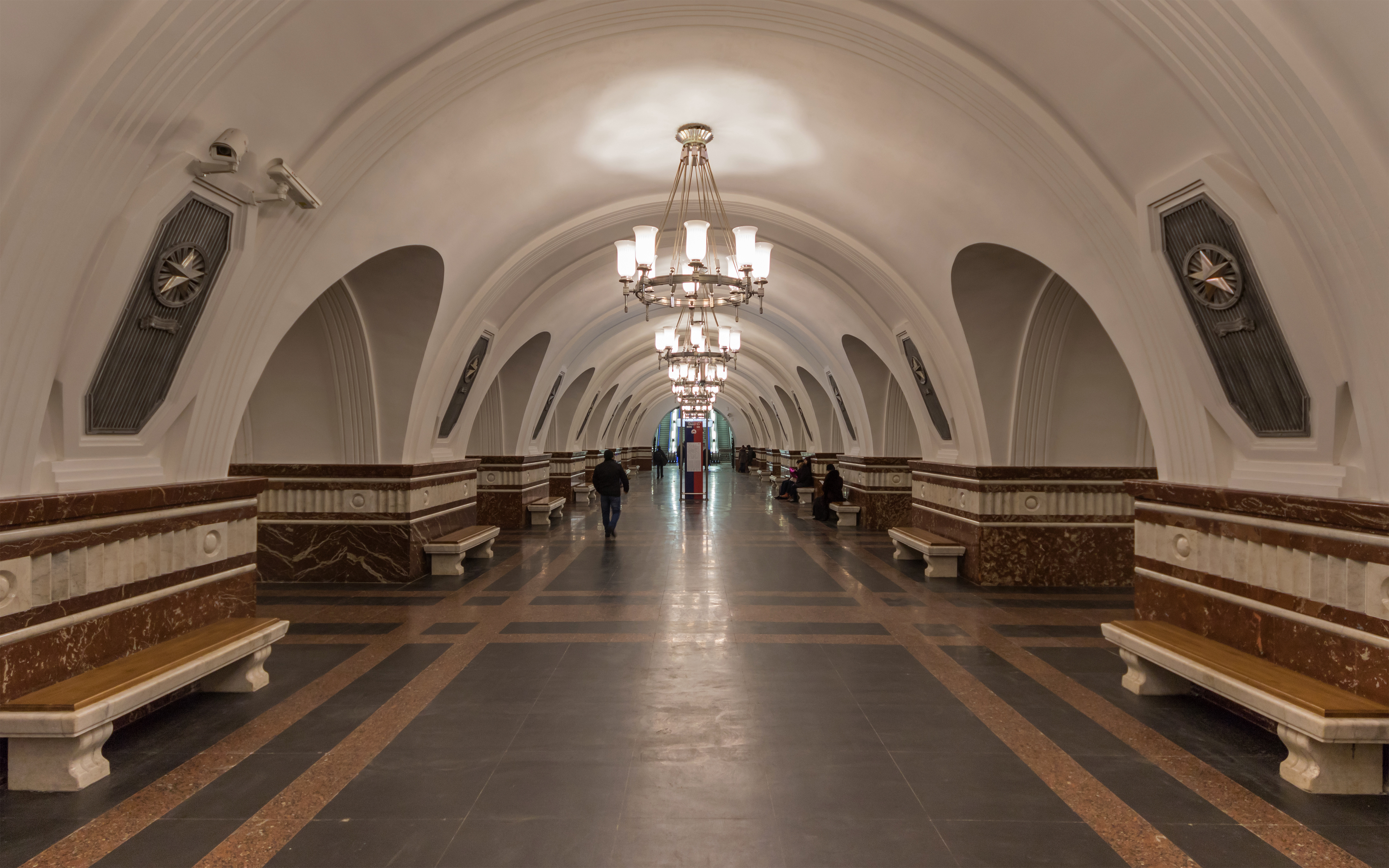

General information
- Location: Khamovniki District; Central Administrative Okrug; Moscow; Russia
- Coordinates: 55.7267°N 37.5786°E
- System: Moscow Metro station
- Owner: Moskovsky Metropoliten
- Line: Sokolnicheskaya line
- Platforms: 1
- Tracks: 2
- Connections: Trolleybus: 28, 31, 31к

Construction
- Structure type: Deep pylon triple-vault station
- Depth: 42 metres (138 ft)
- Platform levels: 1
- Parking: No
- Cycle facilities: No

Other information
- Station code: 014

History
- Opened: 1 May 1957; 69 years ago
- Former names: Khamovnicheskaya, Khamovniki

Services
| Preceding station | Moscow Metro | Following station |
|---|---|---|
| Sportivnaya towards Potapovo | Sokolnicheskaya line | Park Kultury towards Bulvar Rokossovskogo |
Route map
Location
- Location within Moscow Metro

Frunzenskaya (Russian: Фру́нзенская) is a Metro station on the Sokolnicheskaya Line in Moscow, Russia. The station was opened on 1 May 1957 as the first stage of the extension of the Frunzenskiy radius. As the radius follows the bend of the Moskva river, the whole segment had to be built very deep (42 metres/138 ft for Frunzenskaya).

The station closed on 2 January 2016 for renovation, which was expected to last 14 months. The renovations were completed ahead of schedule with the station reopening on December 29, 2016. The renovations included the installation of four new escalators to replace the three that had been in place. Metro authorities projected that the new escalators would reduce energy consumption by 40% and increase the capacity by one-third.

There are future plans to construct a transfer station with the same name to the Rublyovo-Arkhangelskaya and Biryulyovskaya lines when they fusion together.

== Architecture ==
The station is also symbolic as being one of the last in Moscow to be fully built in Stalinist style which dominated the Metro Architecture since the mid-1940s, afterwards the station designs show evidence of more vivid decorations that were meant to be installed yet designs were simplified (examples include the station VDNKh and Alexeyevskaya). Frunzenskaya still stands out and architects Robert Pogrebnoi and Yuriy Zenkivich applied a pylon design with cream marbled vaults and tops of pylons, decorated with metallic shields containing a five-sided star. The bottom of Pylons are a form of a thicker red marble base. Suspended from the ceiling are massive eight-horned chandeliers. The floor is covered with black and red granite on floors and the walls are faced with white ceramic tiles. In the far end of the station, in front of a red-marbled semicircle is a bust to Mikhail Frunze (work of sculptor Yevgeny Vuchetich), a famous military commander in the Russian Civil War for whom the station is named. The station's massive vestibule (architects Nadia Bykova, Ivan Taranov, I.G. Cherepanov, I.G.Gokhar-Kharmandaryan, N.I.Demchinskiy and T.A.Ilina) is situated on the Komsomolskiy Avenue and Kholzunov side-street was partially demolished and built into the Moscow's Palace of Youth building in the 1984, presently receives a daily passenger traffic of 47,410. Also behind the station is a junction for a branch to the Koltsevaya Line used for transfers.

== Gallery ==
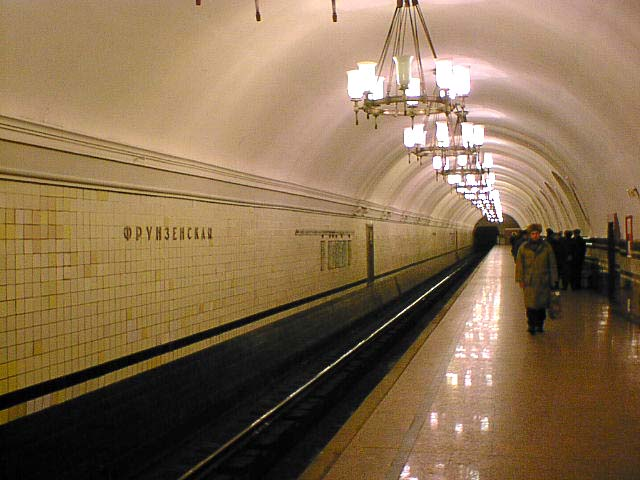
The view of the boarding platform

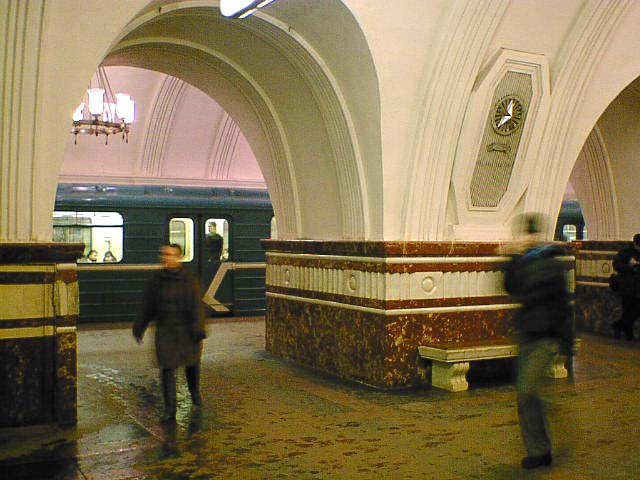
Pylons
