= Vostochny Railway Terminal =

Railway terminal in Moscow

Moscow–Vostochny Восточный вокзал
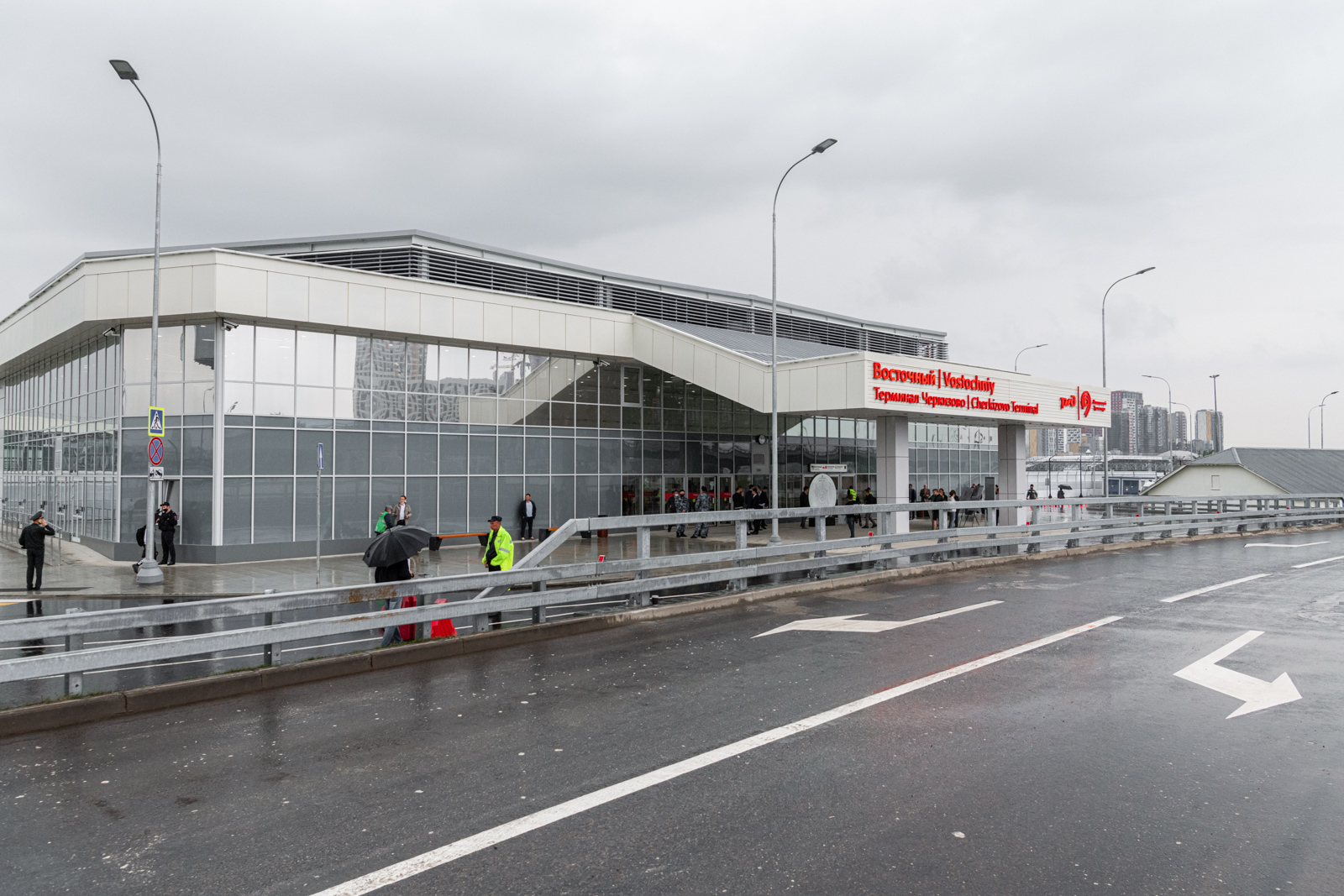

General information
- Location: 1 bldg 5, Shchyolkovskoye Shosse, Moscow; Russia
- Coordinates: 55.802778°N 37.746389°E
- System: Moscow Railway terminal
- Line: Little Ring
- Platforms: 2
- Tracks: 5
- Connections: Moscow Metro stations: Cherkizovskaya; Lokomotiv; Buses: 34, 34к, 52, 171, 230, 372, 449, 469, 552, 716, 974, т32, т41, т83, н15

Construction
- Parking: Yes
- Cycle facilities: Yes
- Architect: Gennady Bespalov

Other information
- Station code: 199208
- Fare zone: 0

History
- Opened: 2021
Location
- Location within Moscow Ring Road

Vostochny railway terminal ("Eastern") (Russian: Восточный вокзал, Vostochnyi vokzal), previously known as Cherkizovsky railway terminal is the newest of the ten railway terminals of Moscow, Russia, opened on 29 May 2021. It is the furthest terminal from the city center, the smallest in terms of the number of platforms and tracks, and the only one from which suburban trains do not depart.

== Location ==
Vostochny terminal located within the boundaries of the Cherkizovo railway station of the Little Ring of the Moscow Railway, together with the Lokomotiv station of the MCC, Cherkizovskaya station of Metro Line 1 and public transport stops, it forms a single interchange hub Cherkizovo.

Vostochny is a transit station for most arriving trains. The station building is two-storied; passage to the main platform and to the Lokomotiv MCC station is located along the gallery from the second floor. The planned daily passenger traffic is about 2,500 people. One-time stay on the platforms: about 200 passengers. The station building has two exits: one towards Amurskaya Street, the other towards Cherkizovskaya metro station and RZD Arena stadium. Transfer to Cherkizovskaya and Lokomotiv is represented by a ground crossing.

== Trains and destinations ==
On 29 May 2021, regular long-distance trains and express trains were launched, including those in transit through Moscow. Vostochny is the final stop for "Lastochka" trains on the route Moscow – Ivanovo, Moscow – Nizhny Novgorod and the high-speed train "Strizh" Nizhny Novgorod – Moscow.
