= Preobrazhenskoye District =

- District
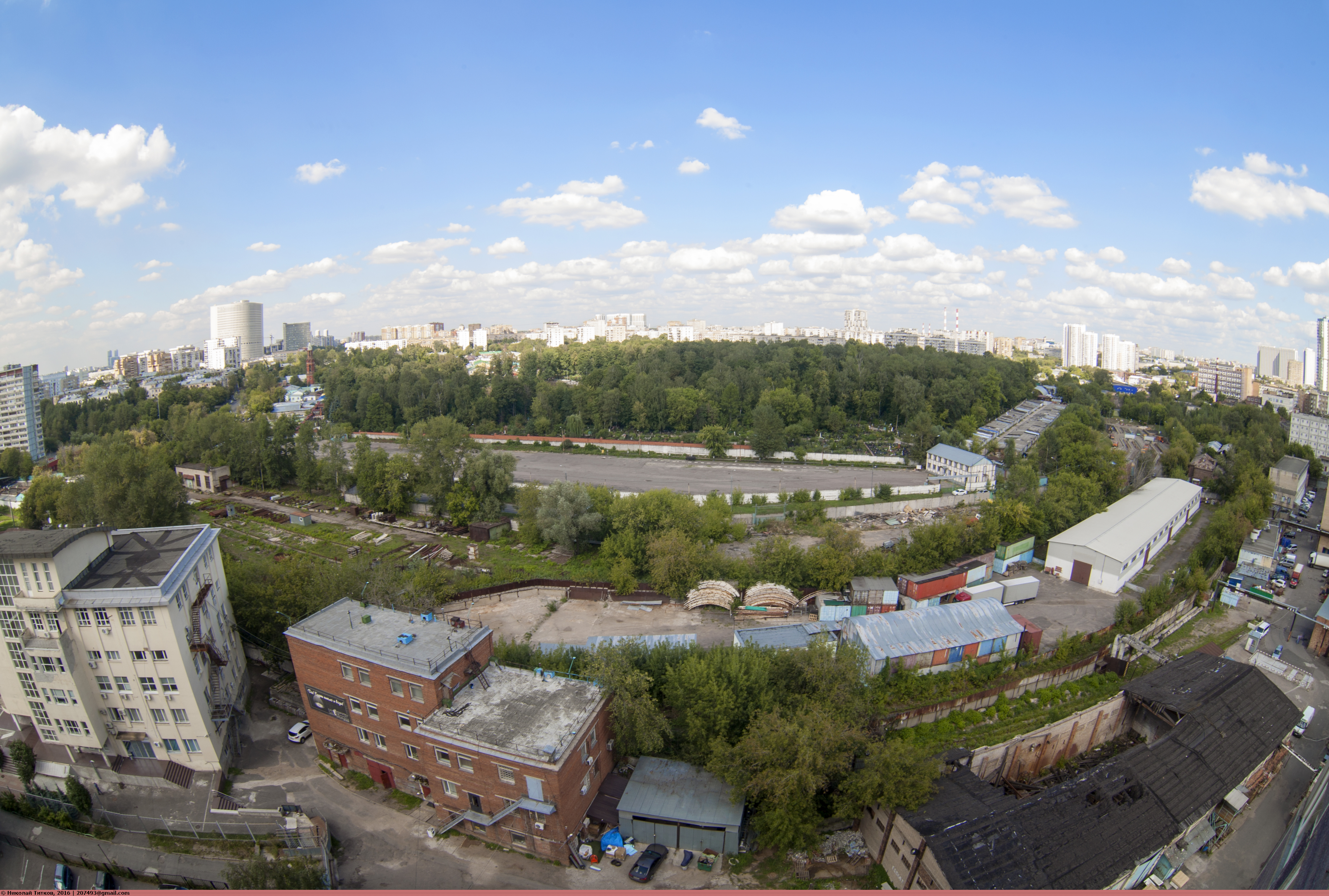
- View of Preobrazhenskoye District

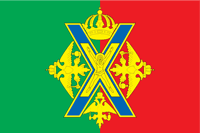
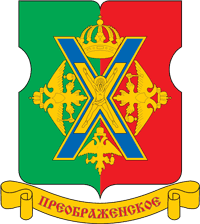
- Flag Coat of arms
- Location of Perovo District on the map of Moscow
- Coordinates: 55°47′53″N 37°43′33″E
- Country: Russia
- Federal subject: Moscow
- Time zone: UTC+
- OKTMO ID: 45316000
- Website: http://preobr.mos.ru/

Preobrazhenskoye District (Russian: райо́н Преображе́нское) is a district of Eastern Administrative Okrug in the federal city of Moscow, Russia.

== Geography ==
Nearby districts include:

- Bogorodskoye (Russian: Богородское) to the north
- Severnoye Izmaylovo (Russian: Северное Измайлово) to the east
- Sokolinaya gora (Russian: Соколиная гора) to the south
- Sokolniki (Russian: район Сокольники) to the west

== Etymology ==
The district takes its name from the village of Preobrazhenskoye (Russian: Преображенское, lit. '[village] of the Transfiguration'), where both Tsar Alexis of Russia (reigned 1645-1676) and his son Peter I of Russia (reigned 1682-1725) had residences.

== History ==
The village of Preobrazhenskoye first appears in records in 1661. At that time two churches were built there; the village took its name after one of them - the Church of the Transfiguration at Preobrazhenskoye. In 1672, during the rule of Alexis of Russia, the first professional theater in Russia was founded here. On November 18 1699, secret diplomatic negotiations between Peter the Great and Western embassies started here, resulting in the signing of an alliance between Russia, Denmark, and Poland-Lithuania against Sweden (November 22, 1699) and the subsequent Great Northern War of 1700-1721.

The district has a reputation as the cradle of the Imperial Russian Navy. Peter the Great (born 1672) spent his adolescent years here together with his mother Natalya Naryshkina - exiled by the order of his half-sister the Tsarevna Sophia Alekseyevna of Russia (regent: 1682-1689). The famous toy army of Peter the Great consisting of Preobrazhensky and Semyonovsky regiments developed here in the 1680s. Peter began implementing the idea of creating a Russian Navy on the nearby Yauza River. His famous botik, which came to be known as the "grandfather of Russian Navy", was re-launched there.

== Transportation ==
There are forty streets total in the district. These include:

- Prostornaya Street
- Bolshaya Cherkizovskaya Street
- Halturinskaya Street
- Preobrazhenskiy Val Street
- 2-aya Pugachevskaya Street
- Hromova Street

The bridges in the district include:

- Preobrazhensky Metro Bridge
- Matrossky Bridge
- Elektrozavodsky Bridge

Public transportation consists of bus, trolleybus, and tram routes.

The district is home to Preobrazhenskaya Ploshchad and Bulvar Rokossovskogo Metro stations. Cherkizovskaya metro station is located nearby.

== Sights ==
The historical Preobrazhenskoye Cemetery is located in the district.

== Sports ==
Lokomotiv association football stadium is located in the district, near Cherkizovskaya metro station. The stadium hosts FC Lokomotiv Moscow team and many national and UEFA matches.
