= Bulvar Rokossovskogo =

Bulvar Rokossovskogo may refer to two stations of the Moscow Metro, Moscow, Russia:

- Bulvar Rokossovskogo (Sokolnicheskaya Line)
- Bulvar Rokossovskogo (Moscow Central Circle)
