= Sviblovo rail yard =

Moscow Metro rail yard

Sviblovo rail yard Электродепо «Свиблово»

General information
- Location: 4 Kolsky street Russia
- System: Moscow metro
- Line: (6) Kaluzhsko-Rizhskaya line
- Connections: Nearest station: Sviblovo

History
- Opened: 30 September 1978

The Sviblovo railyard (Coded as ТЧ-10 TCh-10, ТЧ for Тяговая Часть Tyagovaya Chast, "Tractive Part"), is a railyard on a branch of the Kaluzhsko-Rizhskaya line of the Moscow metro.

== History ==
The first train was put into service on this line from this trainyard on 30 September 1978. Initially carriages of the E and Ezh types were parked inside the trainyard. The 81-717.5/81-714.5 and the 81-717.5M/714.5M were stored in this trainyard from 1992 to 1996. The train type transition to the 81–717 series involved active work by the workers at the trainyard. The trains parked at the trainyard changed to train No. 2654-1425-1426-1427-1428-1429-1431-2657 in 2001.

The trainyard received another carriage of the 81-717/714 type which was previously assigned to the "Krasnaya Presnya" trainyard. The severely worn-out carriages at the trainyard got replaced by new ones from the "Novogireevo" trainyard in 2013. Since 2013 old 81-717/7114 train carriages are sent to this trainyard, where they will be replaced by new ones. There used to be a cargo trainyard housing carriages No. 3678-3645-3256 (and later No. 5131-5251-3256), but was written off in 2012. The No. 5131 and 5251 carriages were reassigned to TCh-12 "Novogireevo" and the No. 3256 carriage to TCh-3 "Izmaylovo" trainyard.

The trainyard has served the Kaluzhsko-Rizhskaya line since 1978. The voice autoinformer in some trains stored in the trainyard used 1999 voice samples which were made up of recordings from 1990 by Vladimir Sushkov and Olga Vysotskaya with inserts of missing lines from approximately 1993, while other trains throughout the line used the 2004 version.

Carriages stored in this trainyard were listed as follows:

Carriage type	Years
E, Ezh, Em-508, Em-509	1978-1996
81-717.5/714.5	Since 1992
81-717.5M/714.5M	Since 1993
81-717/714	Since 2011
