= Prostornaya Street =

Street in Moscow, Russia

Coordinates: 55°48′18.6″N 37°42′58.5″E

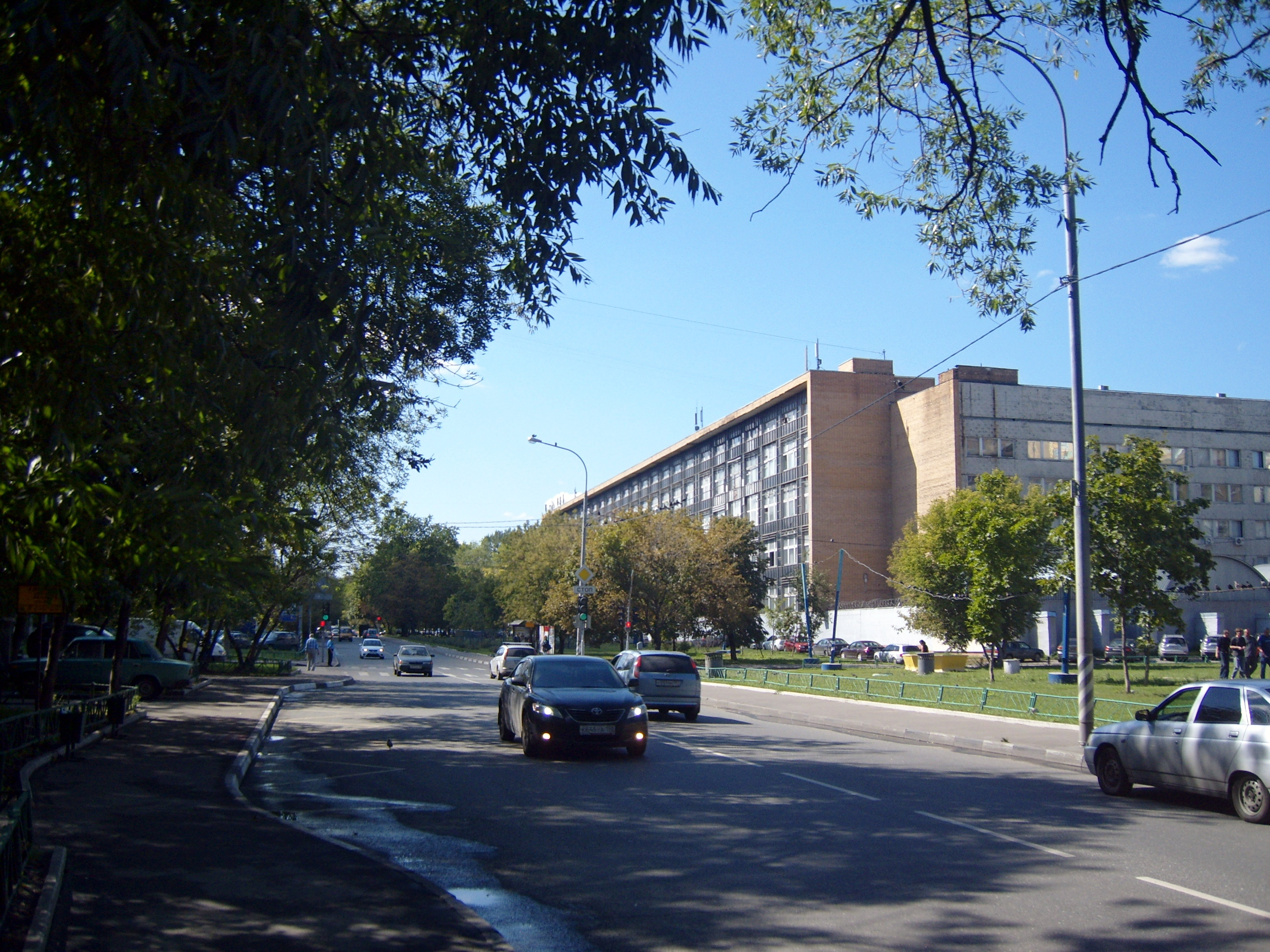
- Interactive map of Prostornaya Street
- Native name: Просторная улица (Russian)
- Length: 1,070 m (3,510 ft)
- Postal code: 107392, 107370
- South West end: Krasnobogatyrskaya Street
- North East end: Otkrytoye Shosse

Prostornaya Street is a street in the Preobrazhenskoye District, Eastern Administrative Okrug, Moscow. It is located between Krasnobogatyrskaya and Halturinskaya streets. The street is a border between Bogorodskoye and Preobrazhenskoye districts.

== History ==
Until 1922 it was named Voskresenskaya Street or Troitskaya Street (it is unknown which one is correct because different sources cite different names). From 1922 to 1925 it was named Arkhipova Street. The current name Prostornaya Street (English: Free, empty) was given to the street because the territory surrounding it was empty, no houses were built at the time.
