= Vladykino railway station =

Vladykino railway station may refer to either of two nearby stations on the Moscow Metro:

- Vladykino (Moscow Central Circle), on line 14
- Vladykino (Serpukhovsko–Timiryazevskaya line), on line 9
