= Cherkizovskaya =

Moscow Metro station

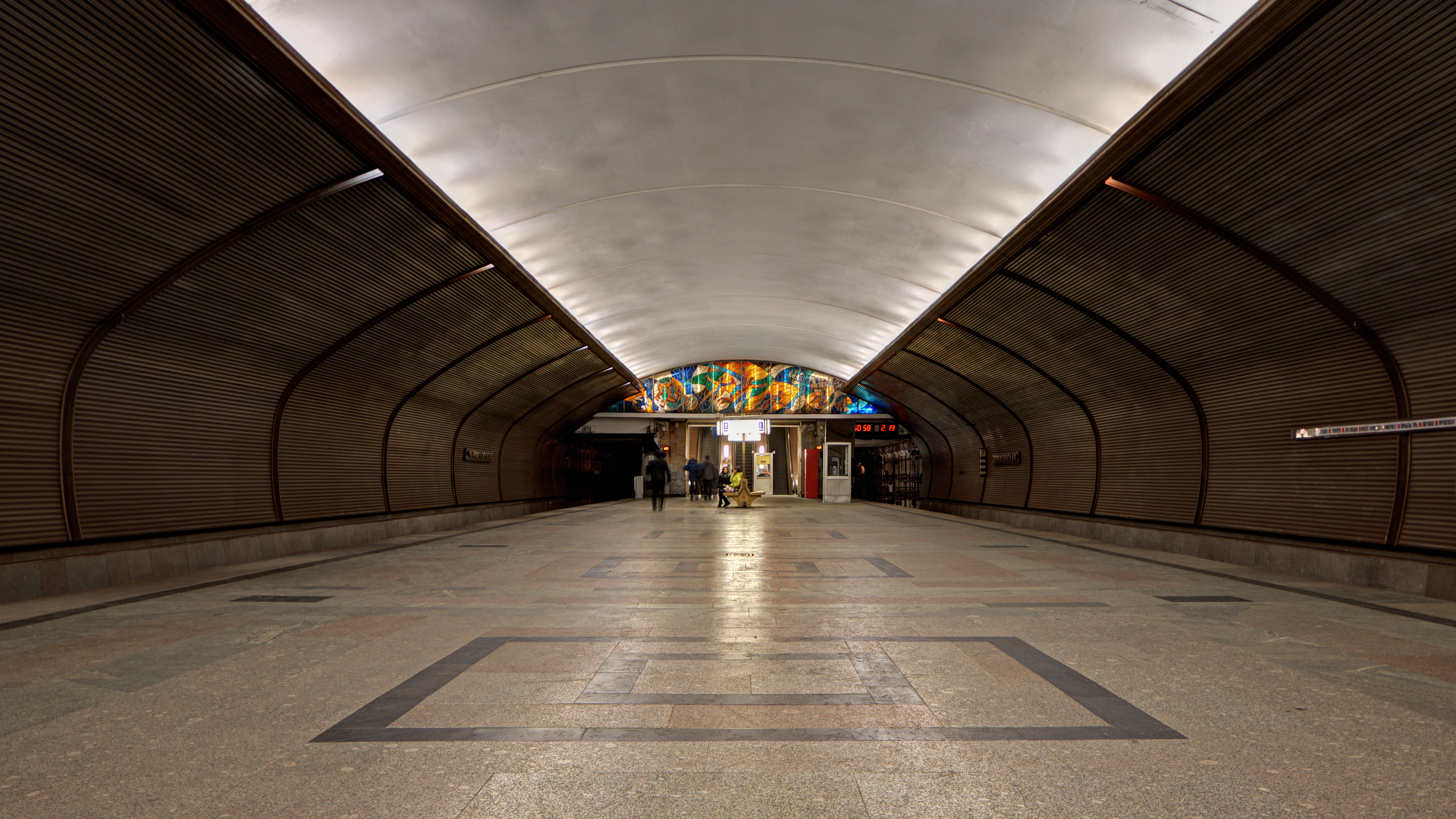

General information
- Location: Okruzhnoy Proyezd; Preobrazhenskoye District; Eastern Administrative Okrug; Moscow; Russia
- Coordinates: 55.8038°N 37.7448°E
- System: Moscow Metro station
- Owner: Moskovsky Metropoliten
- Line: Sokolnicheskaya line
- Platforms: 1 island platform
- Tracks: 2
- Connections: Bus: 34, 52, 171, 230, 716; Trolleybus: 32, 41, 83

Construction
- Structure type: Shallow single-vault
- Depth: 11 metres (36 ft)
- Platform levels: 1
- Parking: 833 park-and-ride car places

Other information
- Station code: 002

History
- Opened: 1 August 1990; 36 years ago

Services
Preceding station	Moscow Metro	Following station
Preobrazhenskaya Ploshchad towards Potapovo	Sokolnicheskaya line	Bulvar Rokossovskogo Terminus
Out-of-station interchange
Bulvar Rokossovskogo anticlockwise / outer	Moscow Central Circle transfer at Lokomotiv	Izmaylovo clockwise / inner
Route map
Location
- Location within Moscow Metro

Cherkizovskaya (Russian: Черки́зовская) is a Moscow Metro station in the Preobrazhenskoye District, Eastern Administrative Okrug, Moscow. It is on the Sokolnicheskaya Line, between Preobrazhenskaya Ploshchad and Ulitsa Podbelskogo stations.

== Design ==
Cherkizovskaya opened in 1990 and was the work of architects V. Cheremin and A. Vigdorov. The station is named after the former village of Cherkizovo which is a district of Moscow nowadays. The design of the station is a single vault, with a curved ceiling and a platform free of pillars. The outer walls are faced with panels of corrugated metal. Both ends of the platform are decorated with stained-glass panels above the exit stairs.

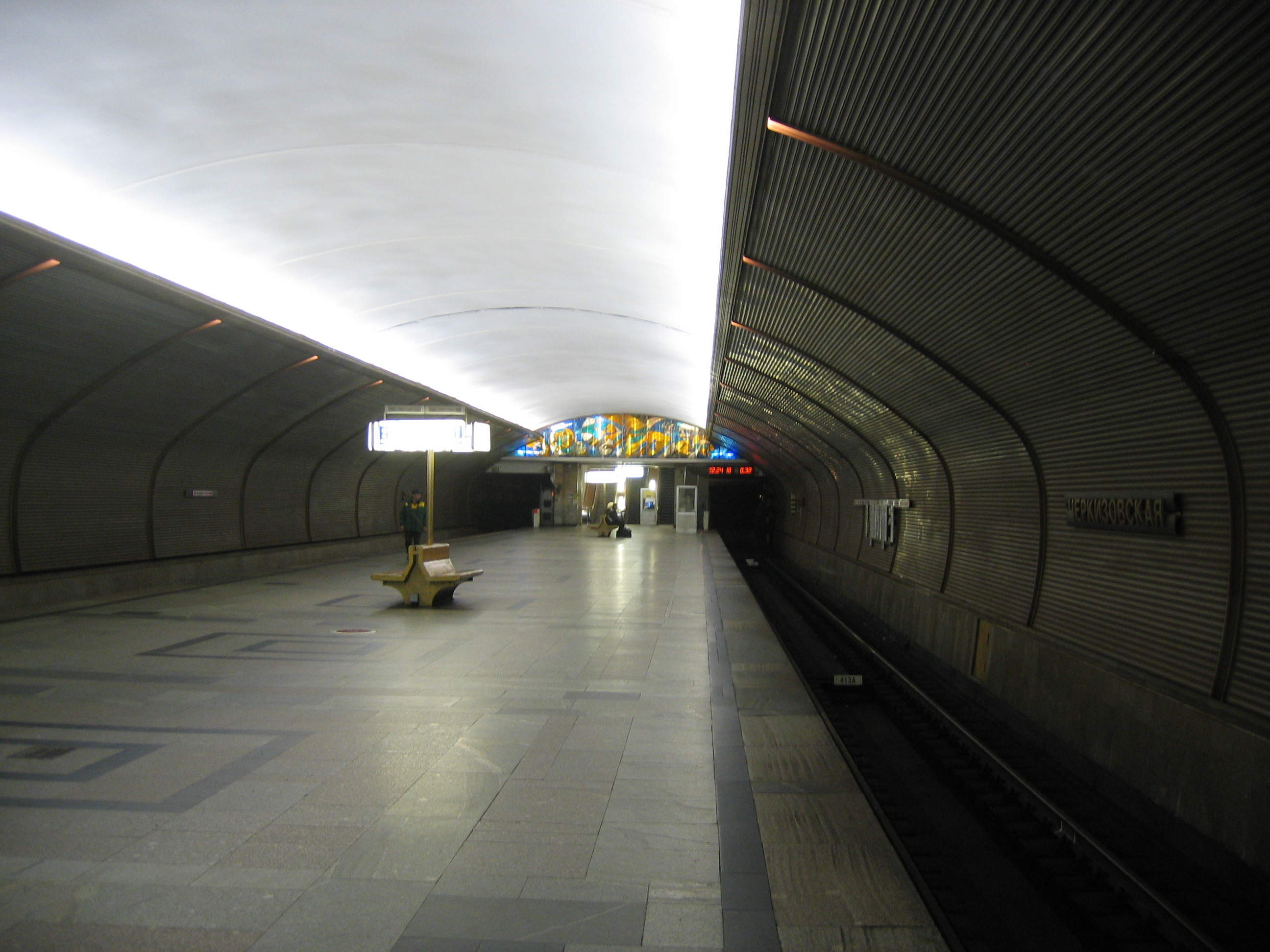
Station platform

== Entrances ==
The station's vestibule is located at Okruzhnoy Proyezd near the intersection with Bolshaya Cherkizovskaya Street. Lokomotiv Stadium is situated nearby.
