= Lokomotiv (Moscow Central Circle) =

Station on the Moscow Central Circle

Lokomotiv Локомотив
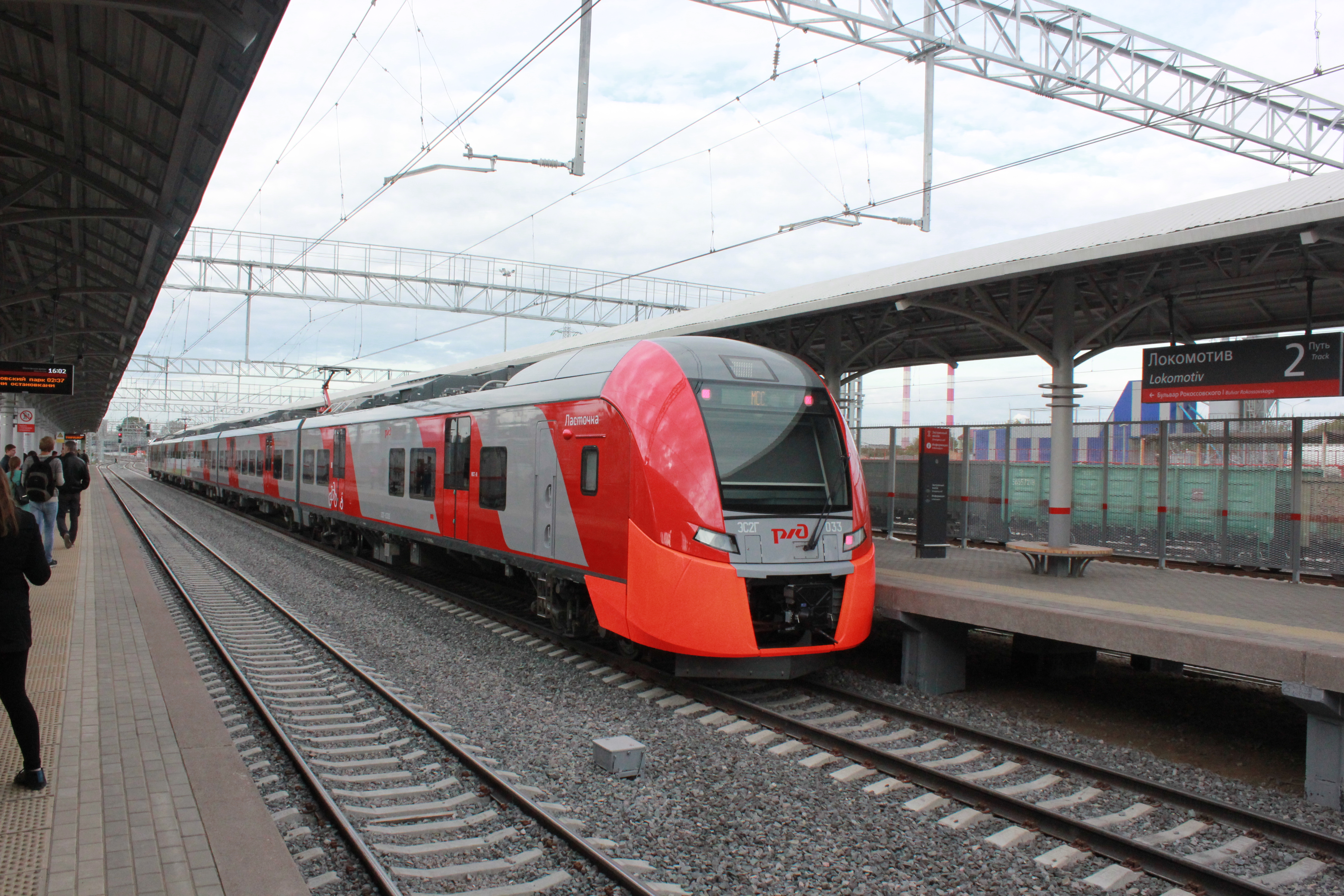

General information
- Coordinates: 55.8039°N 37.7459°E
- System: Moscow Metro
- Owner: Government of Moscow (MKZD)
- Operator: Russian Railways (within Moscow Metro)
- Line: Little Ring Railway
- Platforms: 2 side platforms
- Tracks: 3
- Train operators: Russian Railways

Construction
- Structure type: At-grade
- Cycle facilities: Yes
- Accessible: Yes

History
- Opened: 10 September 2016; 9 years ago

Services
Preceding station	Moscow Metro	Following station
Bulvar Rokossovskogo anticlockwise / outer	Moscow Central Circle	Izmaylovo clockwise / inner
Out-of-station interchange
Preceding station	Moscow Metro	Following station
Preobrazhenskaya Ploshchad towards Potapovo	Sokolnicheskaya line transfer at Cherkizovskaya	Bulvar Rokossovskogo Terminus
Location
- Location within Moscow Metro

Lokomotiv (Russian: Локомотив) is a passenger station on the Moscow Central Circle of the Moscow Metro that opened in September 2016.

== Name ==
The station, which was to be named Cherkizovo, reflecting the name of a village originally on the site, was ultimately named Lokomotiv for the soccer team that plays its home games nearby.

== Transfer ==
Lokomotiv offers out-of-station transfers to Cherkizovskaya on the Sokolnicheskaya Line. A new station was opened in 2021 for some overnight train services, rerouted from Moskva-Kurskaya station.

== Gallery ==
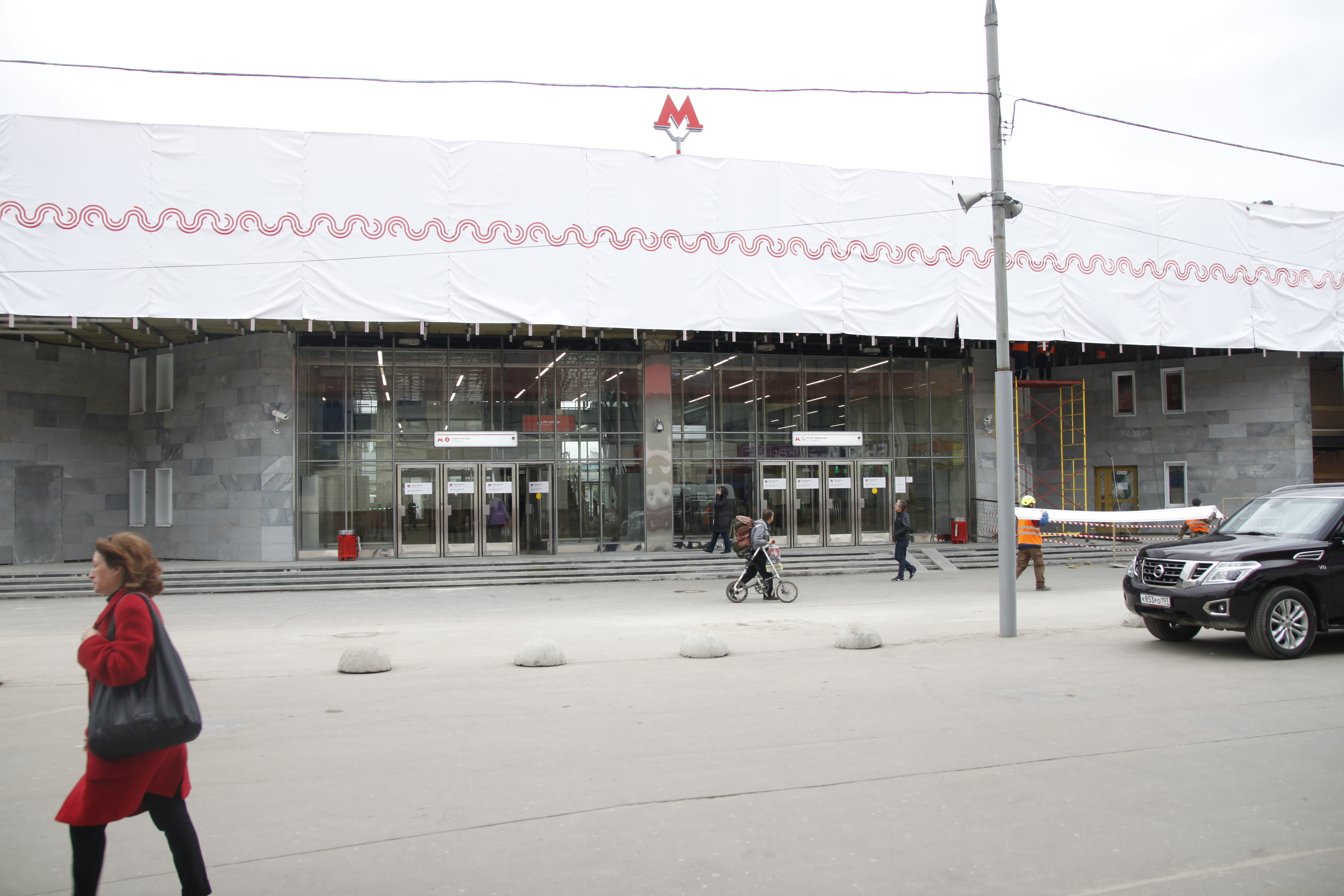

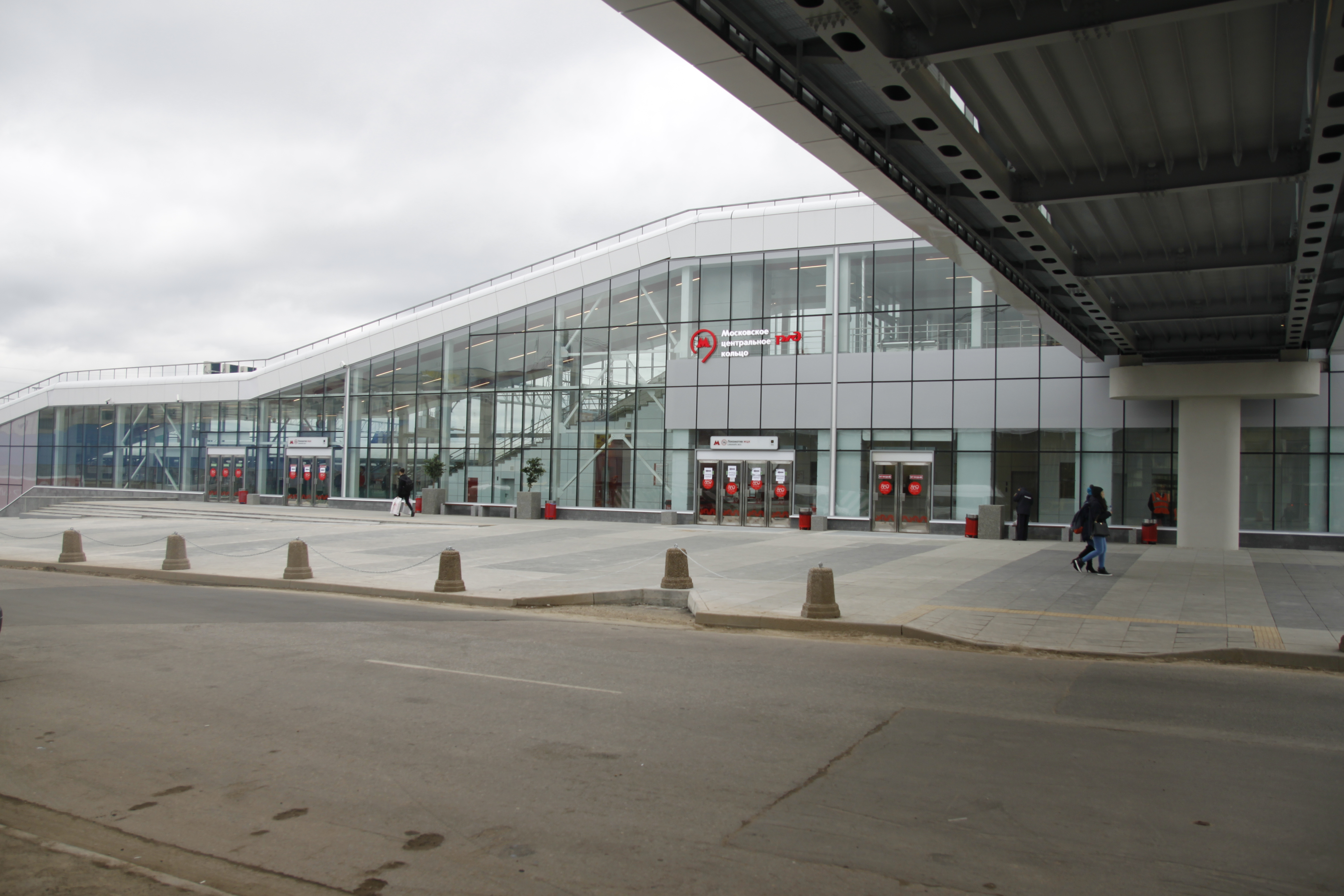

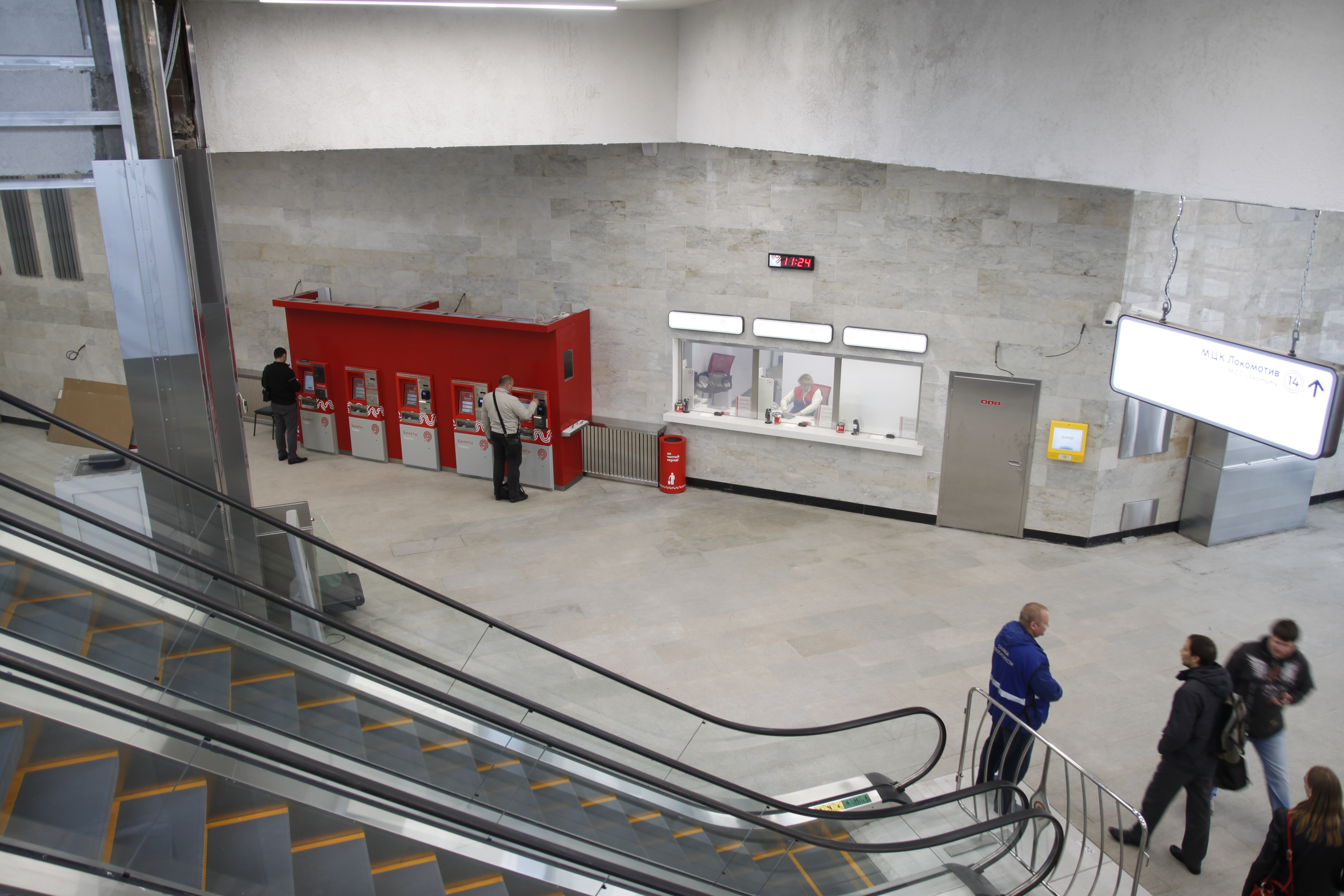

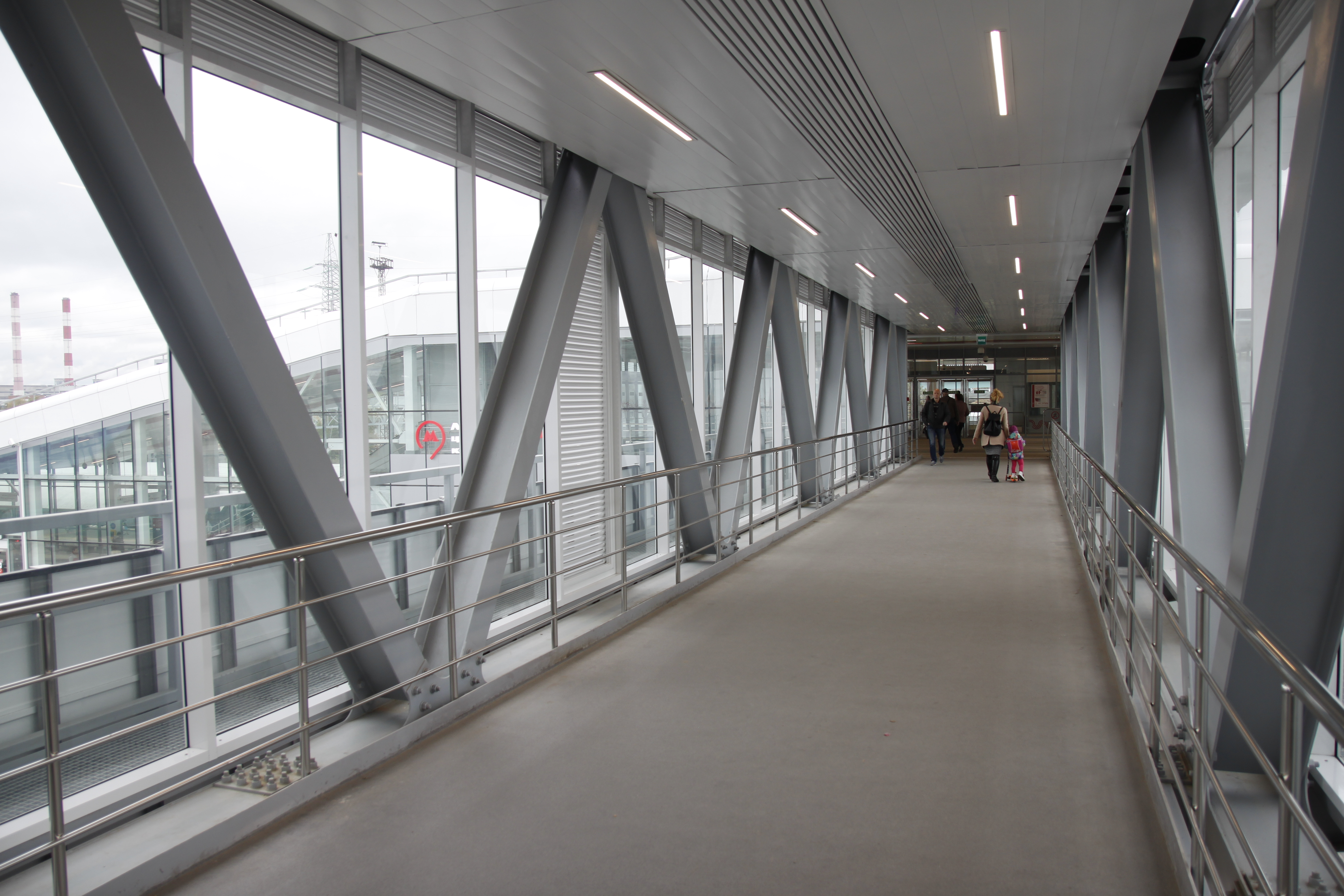
