= Bulvar Rokossovskogo (Moscow Central Circle) =

Station on the Moscow Central Circle

Bulvar Rokossovskogo Бульвар Рокоссовского
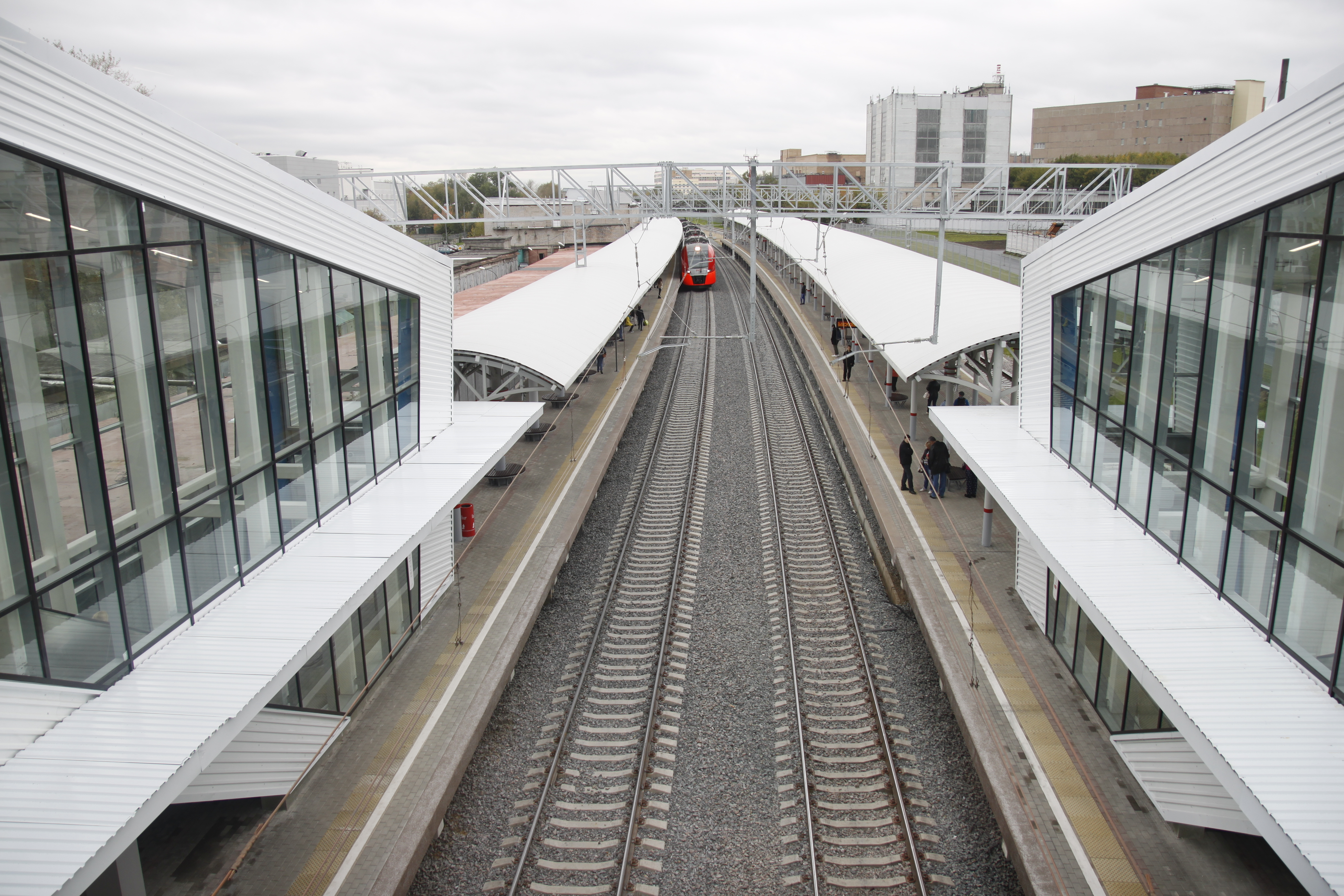

General information
- Coordinates: 55.8172°N 37.7373°E
- System: Moscow Metro
- Owner: Government of Moscow (MKZD)
- Operator: Russian Railways (within Moscow Metro)
- Line: Moscow Central Circle
- Platforms: 2 side platforms
- Tracks: 2
- Connections: Tram Line 2 and 4pr

Construction
- Structure type: At-grade
- Parking: Yes
- Cycle facilities: Yes
- Accessible: Yes

History
- Opened: 10 September 2016; 9 years ago

Services
Preceding station	Moscow Metro	Following station
Belokamennaya anticlockwise / outer	Moscow Central Circle	Lokomotiv clockwise / inner
Out-of-station interchange
Preceding station	Moscow Metro	Following station
Cherkizovskaya towards Potapovo	Sokolnicheskaya line transfer at Bulvar Rokossovskogo	Terminus
Location
- Location within Moscow Metro

Bulvar Rokossovskogo (Russian: Бульвар Рокоссовского) is a station on the Moscow Central Circle of the Moscow Metro.

== Name ==
Prior to opening, the station's named was changed by the city from Otkrytoye Shosse.

== Transfer ==
The station offers out-of-station transfers to Bulvar Rokossovskogo of the Sokolnicheskaya Line.

== Gallery ==
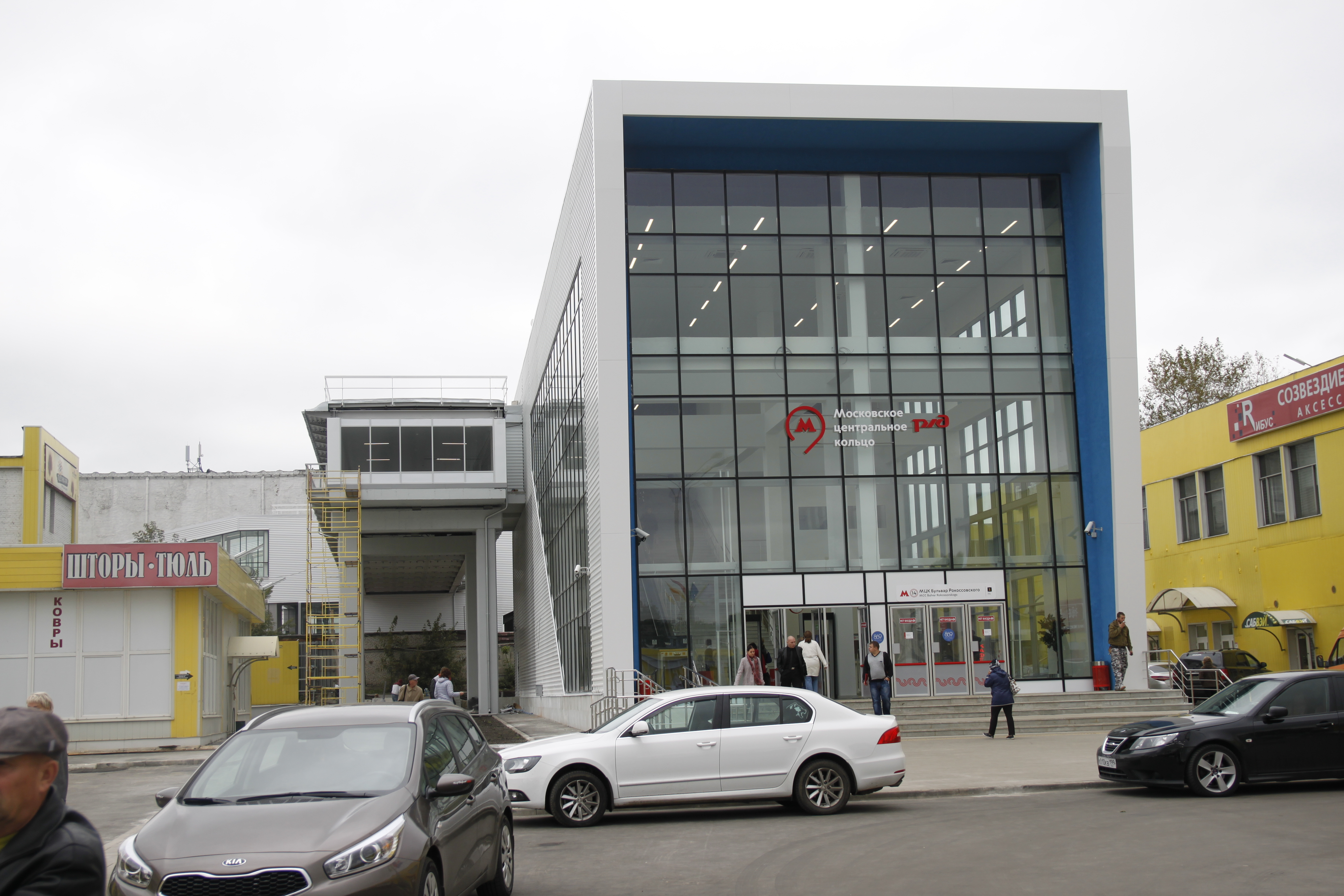

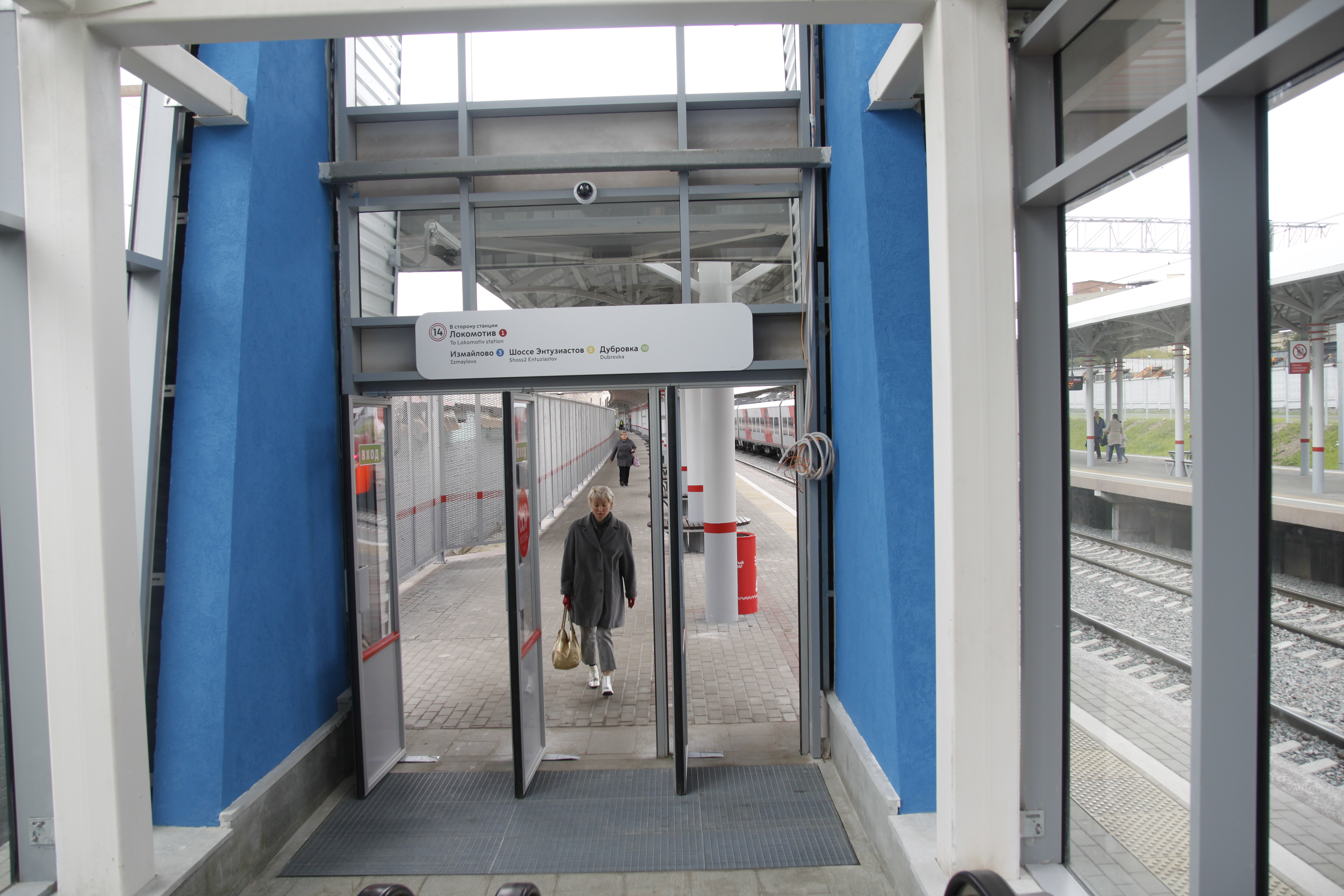

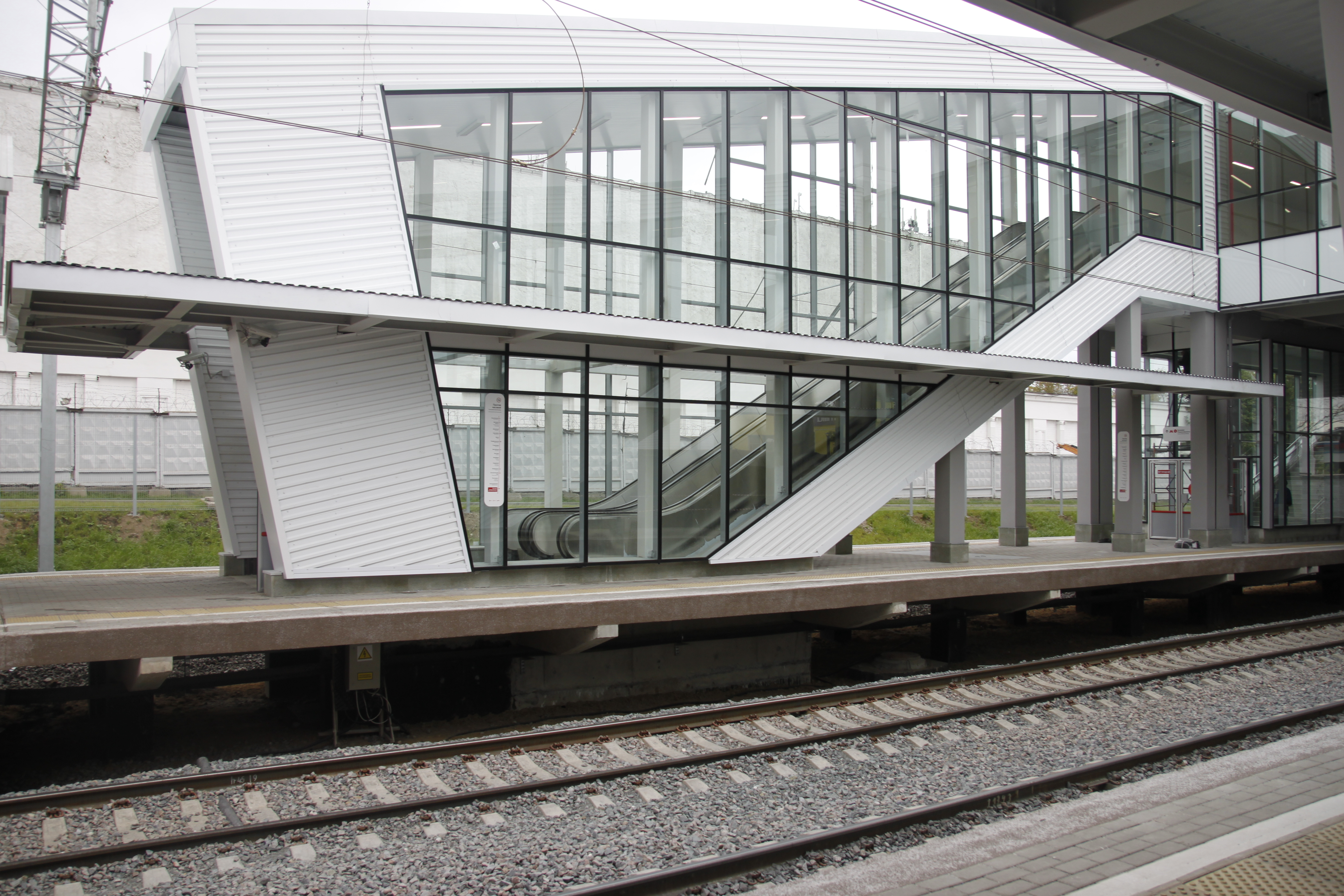
