= Lokomotiv Stadium (Moscow) =

Football stadium in Moscow, Russia

RZD Arena
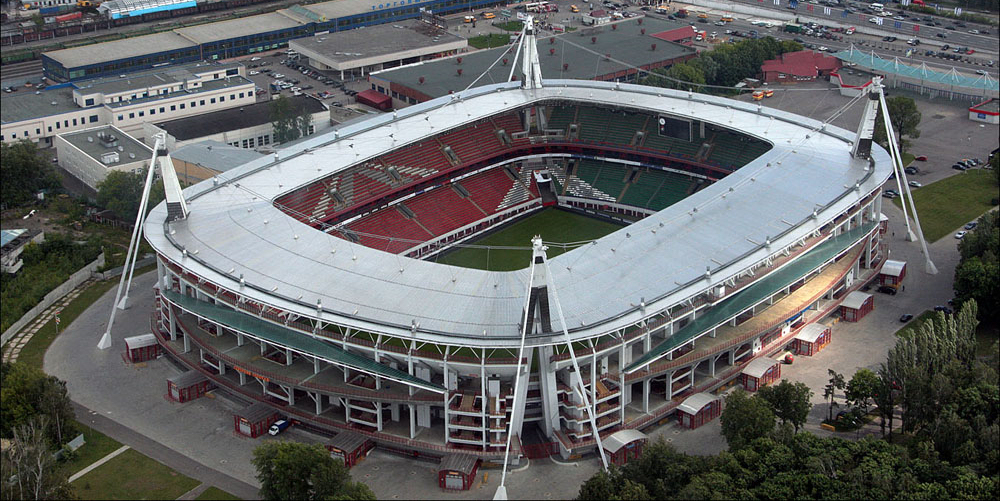
- Interactive map of RZD Arena
- Former names: Stalinets, Lokomotiv
- Location: Moscow, Russia
- Coordinates: 55°48′13″N 37°44′28″E
- Owner: Russian Railways
- Operator: Lokomotiv Moscow
- Capacity: 27,320
- Surface: Grass
- Field size: 104m × 68m
- Public transit: Cherkizovskaya; Lokomotiv

Construction
- Groundbreaking: 2000
- Opened: 5 July 2002
- Cost: $150–170 million
- Architect: Dmitry Bush

Tenants
- Lokomotiv Moscow (2002–present); Russia national football team (selected matches)

Website
- www.fclm.ru/en/club/stadium

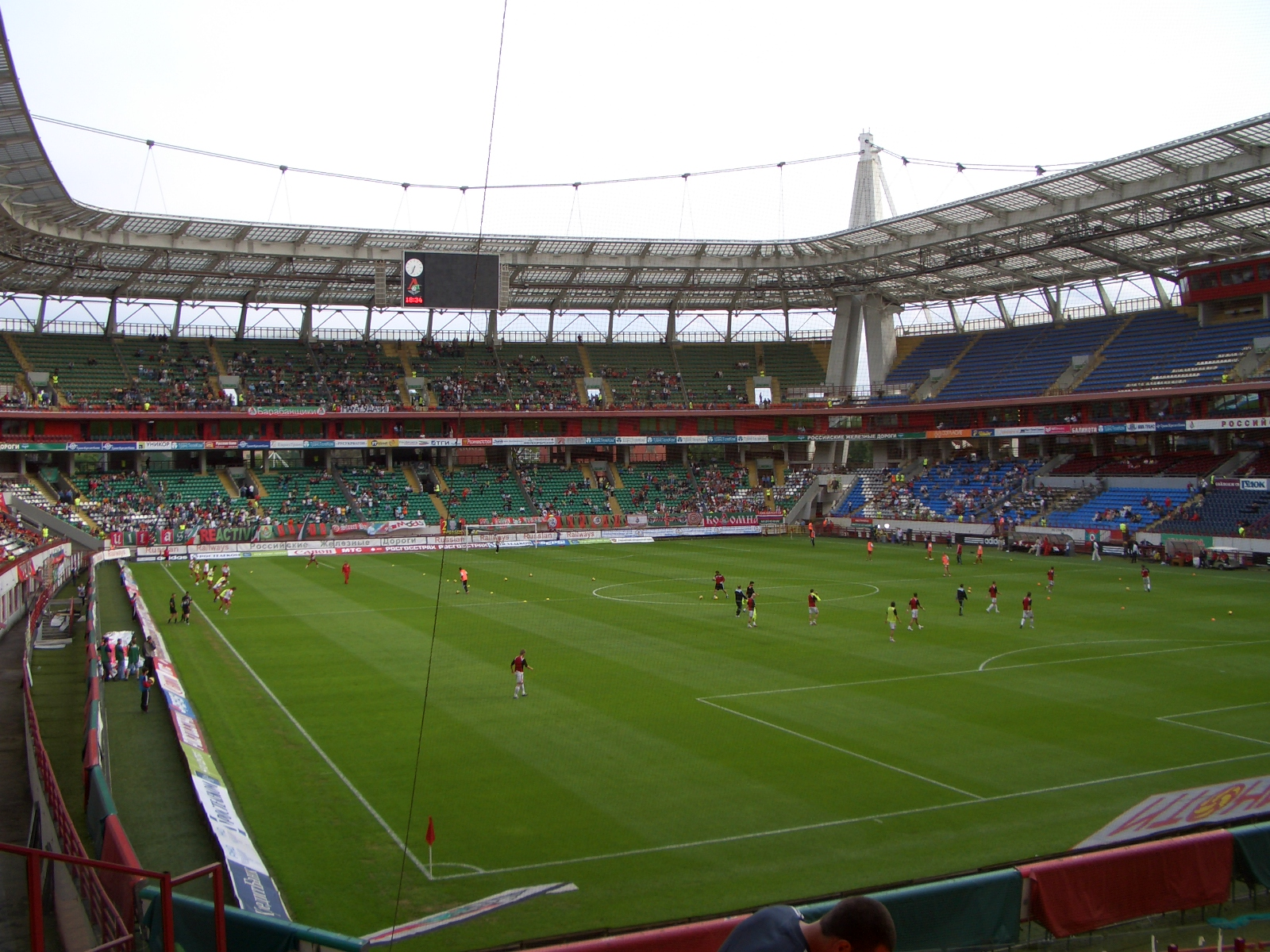
Lokomotiv Stadium, before a game

RZD Arena (Russian: «РЖД Арена») is a football stadium in Moscow, Russia. Formerly known as Lokomotiv Stadium, it is the home stadium of Lokomotiv Moscow and was the home ground of the Russian national team for the 2010 FIFA World Cup qualification matches. The stadium was reconstructed in 2002 and holds 27,084 people, all seated. The reconstruction of the stadium was funded by the Russian Transportation Ministry at a cost of $150–170 million.

== History ==
=== Stalinets ===
In 1935, at the site where the Lokomotiv Stadium resides today, an electric workers union decided to build a stadium which was named "Stalinets" or "Stalinist Stadium". At the time, Stalinets held about 30,000 spectators.

=== Development of Lokomotiv Stadium ===
After holding several matches, Stalinets was demolished to make way for a more modern stadium. Thus, the Lokomotiv Stadium was built. It was opened on 17 August 1966 with a capacity of 30,000 people. However, in the mid-1990s the capacity of the stadium was reduced by 6,000 to 24,000, as the wooden benches were replaced by plastic seats.

The inaugural match played at the Lokomotiv Stadium was between Lokomotiv Moscow and Dynamo Kiev. As years rolled on, Lokomotiv held several important matches such as Russian National team home matches, Lokomotiv matches and others. The stadium also played host to a European Cup Qualifier between Spartak Moscow and Swiss club Sion. The match finished 2-2; however, the Swiss club then had UEFA to measure the posts for compliance with international standards. Indeed, the size of the posts were shown to infringe international standards. Eventually, UEFA ordered a replay, which Spartak won 5-1.

=== Reconstruction ===
The Lokomotiv Moscow board felt that a new stadium would be the best option. The construction was backed by the Russian Transport Ministry. The new stadium held its first match on July 5, 2002.

On 5 August 2017, Lokomotiv announced that the stadium has been renamed to the RZD Arena following a deal with Russian Railways.

== Description ==
Stadium plan

Lokomotiv was designed solely for football matches and thus has no running tracks. In all the stadium holds 30,000 people. Moreover, beside the stadium, one can find the Minor Sports Arena Lokomotiv.

== Concerts ==
Depeche Mode performed at the stadium on 22 June 2013 during their Delta Machine Tour.

== See also ==
- List of football stadiums in Russia
- List of European stadia by capacity

Preceded by Rajamangala National Stadium; Bangkok	FIFA U-20 Women's World Championship; Final Venue; 2006	Succeeded by Estadio Bicentenario Municipal; La Florida
