= Izmaylovo (Moscow Central Circle) =

Station on the Moscow Central Circle

Izmaylovo Измайлово
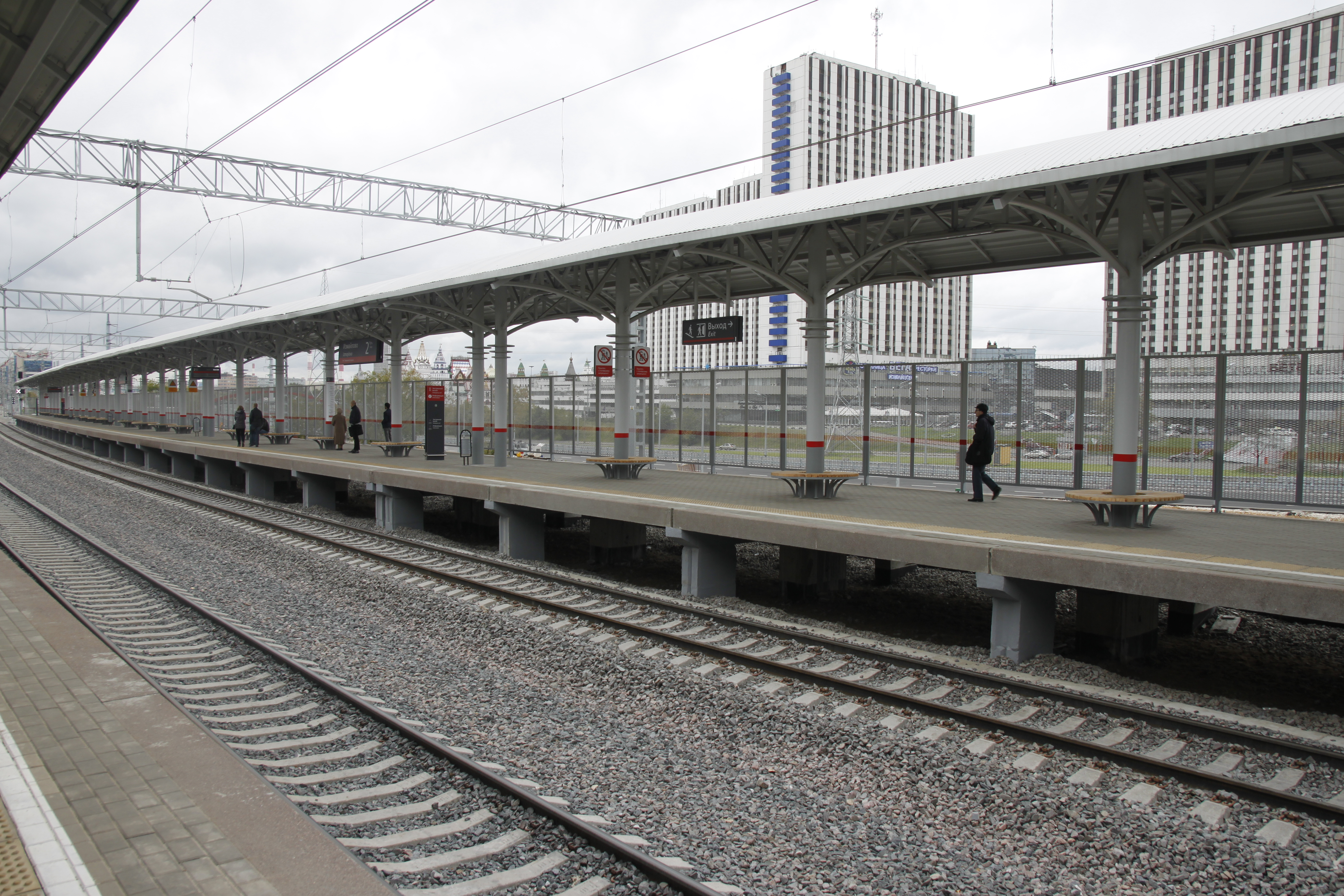

General information
- Location: Izmaylovo District, Moscow
- Coordinates: 55.7896°N 37.7434°E
- System: Moscow Metro
- Owner: Government of Moscow (MKZD)
- Operator: Russian Railways (within Moscow Metro)
- Line: Moscow Central Circle
- Platforms: 2 side platforms
- Tracks: 3
- Train operators: Russian Railways
- Connections: Partizanskaya Bus Station

Construction
- Structure type: At-grade
- Parking: Yes
- Cycle facilities: Yes
- Accessible: Yes

History
- Opened: 10 September 2016; 9 years ago
- Former names: Izmaylovsky Park (before opened)

Services
Preceding station	Moscow Metro	Following station
Lokomotiv anticlockwise / outer	Moscow Central Circle	Sokolinaya Gora clockwise / inner
Out-of-station interchange
Preceding station	Moscow Metro	Following station
Semyonovskaya towards Pyatnitskoye Shosse	Arbatsko-Pokrovskaya line transfer at Partizanskaya	Izmaylovskaya towards Shchyolkovskaya
Location
- Location within Moscow Metro

Izmaylovo (Russian: Измайлово) is a station on the Moscow Central Circle of the Moscow Metro that opened in September 2016.

== Name ==
The station is named for the Izmaylovo District in which it is situated. The city changed the station name from Izmaylovsky Park shortly before the line opened.

== Transfer ==
Passengers may make free, out-of-station transfers to Partizanskaya station in the Arbatsko-Pokrovskaya Line via an enclosed walkway over Vernisazhskaya Ulitsa.

== Gallery ==
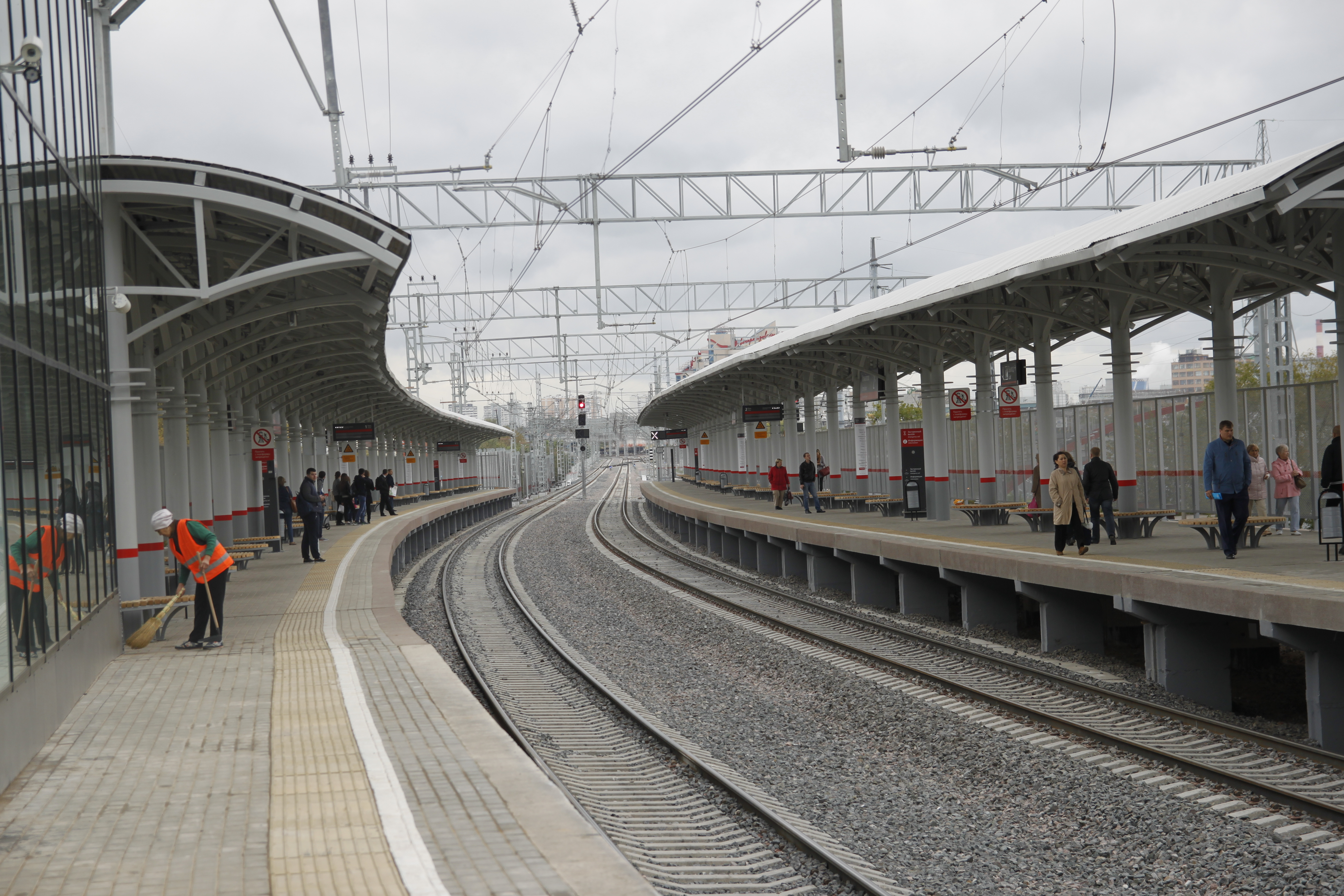

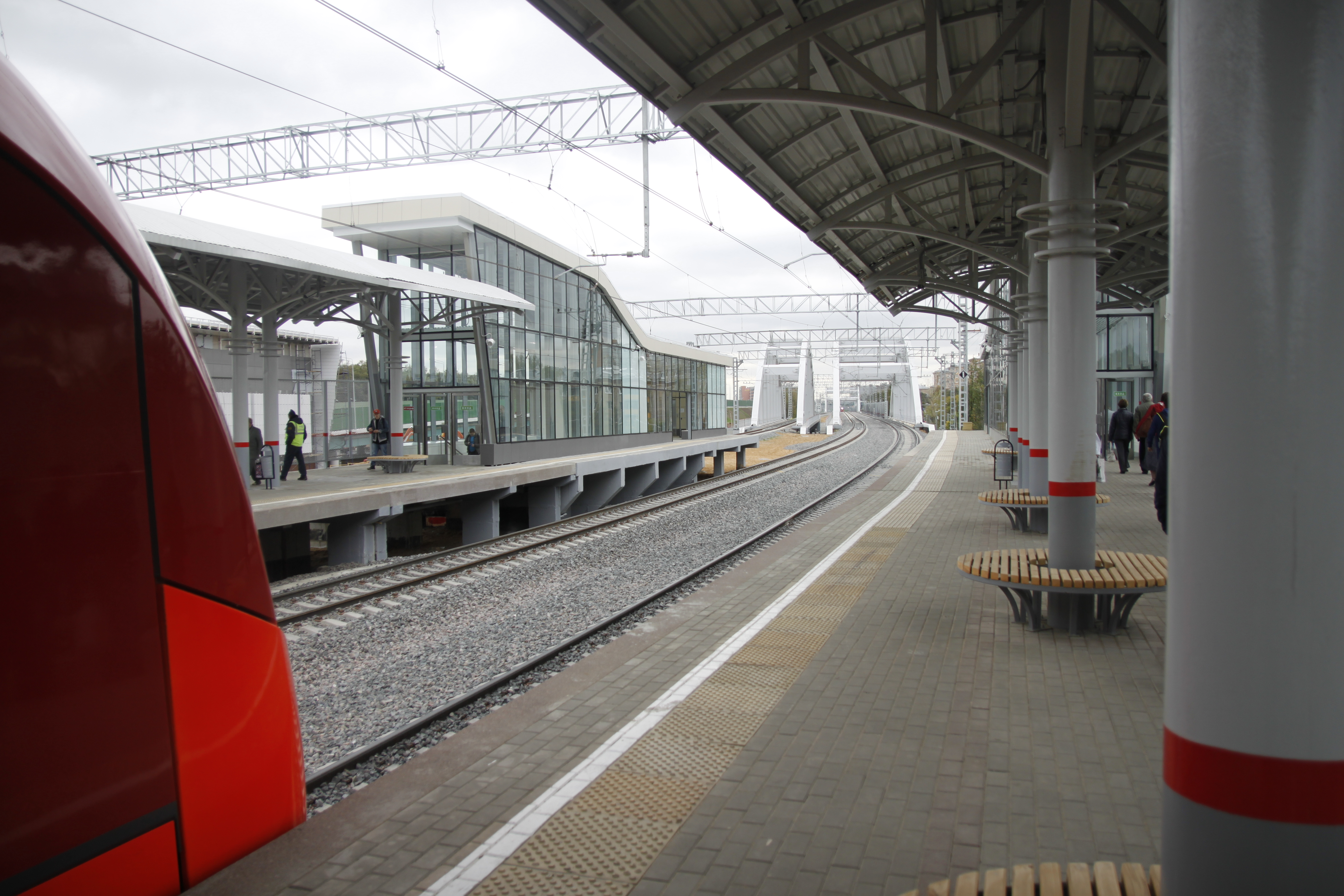

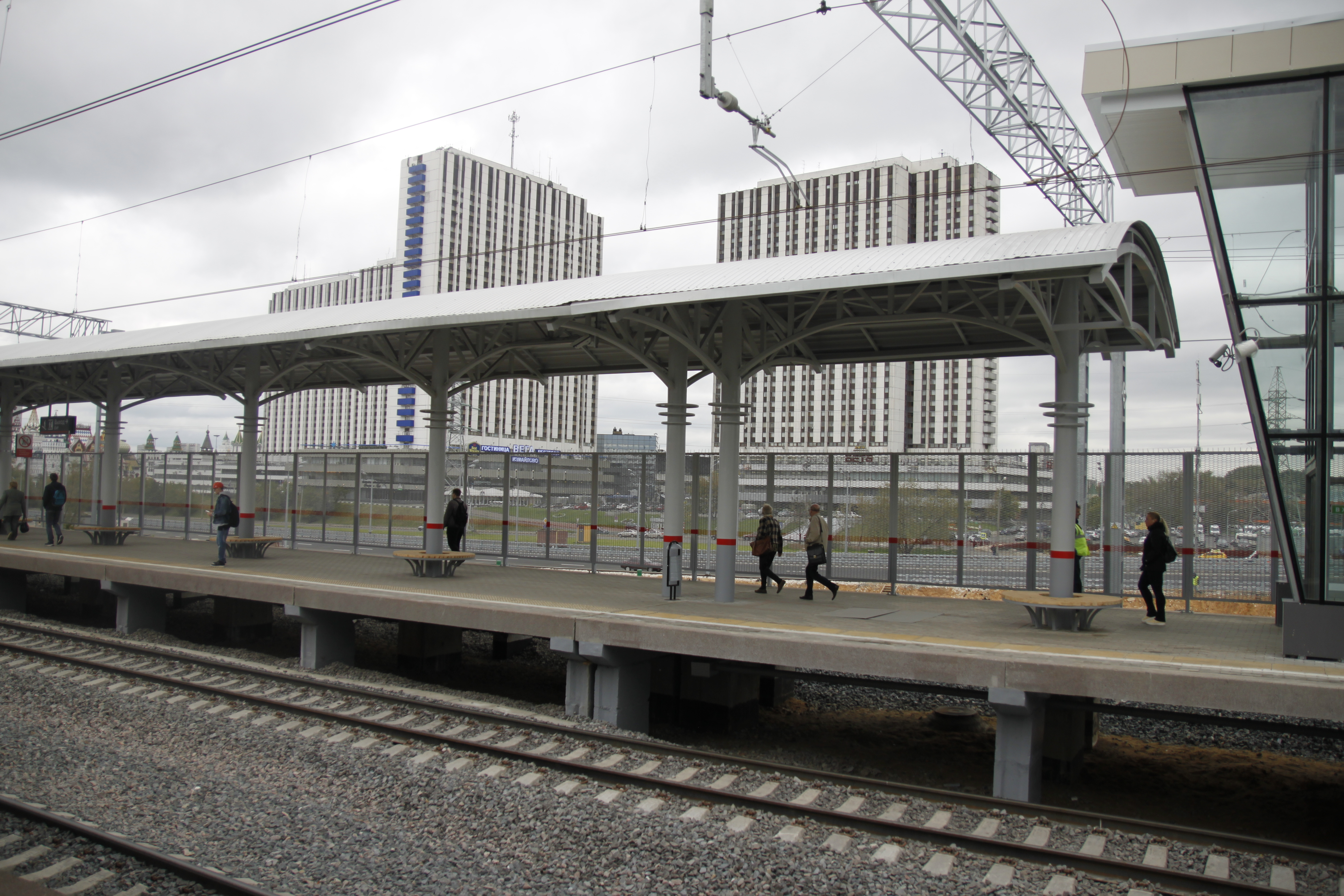
